= Carrier Strike Group 9 =

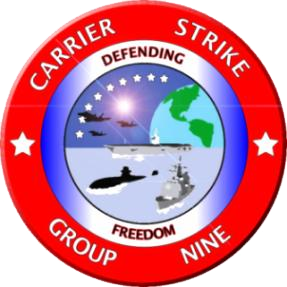
- Carrier Strike Group 9 crest
- Active: 1 October 2004 to date.
- Country: US
- Branch: United States Navy
- Type: Carrier strike group
- Role: Naval air/surface warfare
- Part of: U.S. Third Fleet
- Garrison/HQ: Naval Air Station North Island, California
- Nickname: Theodore Roosevelt Carrier Strike Group (TRCSG)
- Patron: President Theodore Roosevelt
- Motto: Defending Freedom
- Engagements: Operation Enduring Freedom (OEF); Operation Iraqi Freedom (OIF); Operation Enduring Freedom – Afghanistan (OEF-A); Operation New Dawn (OND); Operation Praying Mantis (OPM)
- Decorations: Humanitarian Service Medal (2005)
- Website: Official Website

Commanders
- Commander: Rear Admiral Marcos Jasso

Aircraft flown
- Electronic warfare: EA-18G Growler
- Fighter: F/A-18E/F Super Hornet; F-35C Lightning II
- Helicopter: MH-60R Seahawk; MH-60S Knighthawk
- Reconnaissance: E-2D Advanced Hawkeye
- Transport: CMV-22B Osprey

Carrier Strike Group 9 (CSG-9 or CARSTRKGRU 9) is a U.S. Navy carrier strike group. Commander Carrier Strike Group 9 (COMCARSTRKGRU 9 or CCSG 9) is responsible for unit-level training, integrated training, and material readiness for the ships and aviation squadrons assigned to the group. The group reports to Commander, U.S. Third Fleet, which also supervises its pre-deployment training and certification that includes Composite Unit Training Exercises.

It is currently assigned to the U.S. Pacific Fleet. The Nimitz-class aircraft carrier USS Theodore Roosevelt (CVN-71) is the group's current flagship. Other group units include Carrier Air Wing 11 and the Arleigh Burke-class destroyers USS John S. McCain (DDG-56), USS Halsey (DDG-97), and the USS Daniel Inouye (DDG-118).

The strike group traces its history to Cruiser-Destroyer Group 3, created on 30 June 1973, by the re-designation of Cruiser Destroyer Flotilla 11. From 2004, the strike group has made multiple Middle East deployments providing air forces over Afghanistan and Iraq, as well as conducting Maritime Security Operations. The strike group received the Humanitarian Service Medal in recognition of its disaster relief efforts in Indonesia during Operation Unified Assistance in 2004–05.

== Historical background ==
USS Coontz flew the flag of the Commander, Cruiser-Destroyer Flotilla 11 from 1 August to 11 November 1962.

Effective 30 June 1973, Commander Cruiser Destroyer Flotilla 11 was re-designated as Commander Cruiser-Destroyer Group Three (CCDG-3). USS Gridley was part of Cruiser-Destroyer Group Three in 1975. In 1978, the Group directed Destroyer Squadron 7, Destroyer Squadron 17, and Destroyer Squadron 27 (Naval Reserve Force), all at San Diego. On 10 December 1981, the group staff embarked on board the aircraft carrier USS Ranger to prepare for its first Carrier Battle Group deployment. Since that date, deployments have been made in USS Kitty Hawk, USS Enterprise, USS Nimitz, and USS Carl Vinson. Cruiser-Destroyer Group Three was embarked in USS Abraham Lincoln when it was redesignated to its current designation of Carrier Strike Group Nine in 2004.

Rear Admiral Jonathan Howe commanded the group in 1984–86. During 1986, Enterprise's battle group deployment was directed by Commander Cruiser-Destroyer Group Three.

In early 1991, Rear Admiral P. M. Quast, commander, Cruiser-Destroyer Group Three, led Battle Group Bravo on deployment to the Middle East. The group consisted of USS Nimitz, USS Texas, USS Rentz, USS Stein, USS Harold E. Holt, USS Camden, and USS Chancellorsville, along with commander, Destroyer Squadron 21 and Carrier Air Wing Nine embarked in Nimitz.

In April 1992, the Navy implemented the 'core battle group' concept. From this point each carrier battle group was planned to consist of an aircraft carrier; an embarked carrier air wing; cruisers, destroyers, and frigates; and two nuclear-powered attack submarines. This reorganization set off a round of ship arrivals and reassignments for the group. From April 1992 the group was assigned as permanent Immediate Superior in Command for USS Antietam, USS Arkansas, and USS Vincennes. USS England was assigned to CCDG-3, but was decommissioned in January 1994. In August 1992, USS Carl Vinson and Carrier Air Wing Fourteen were added, and CCDG-3 took on the additional title of Commander, Carl Vinson Battle Group. In October 1992, Surface Squadron 5 was redesignated Destroyer Squadron 5 and assigned under CCDG-3. The addition of USS Cushing, USS Harry W. Hill, USS Fletcher, and USS Reuben James rounded out the Vinson Battle Group's forces. In December 1992, two submarines, USS San Francisco and USS Asheville were added. USS Lake Erie joined the group in March 1993 and USS Russell joined in September 1994.

Following this round of reassignments, Polmar reported in 1993 that the group had the following structure:

Cruiser-Destroyer Group Three, late 1992

Guided-Missile Cruisers	Destroyer Squadron Five	Carrier Air Wing Fourteen squadrons embarked aboard USS Carl Vinson (CVN-70)	
USS Lake Erie (CG-70)	USS Russell (DDG-59)	Fighter Squadron 31: F-14D	Electronic Warfare Squadron 139: EA-6B
USS Antietam (CG-54)	USS Fletcher (DD-992)	Fighter Squadron 11: F-14D	Airborne Early Warning Squadron 113: E-2C
USS Vincennes (CG-49)	USS Harry W. Hill (DD-986)	Strike Fighter Squadron 113: F/A-18C	Sea Control Squadron 35: S-3B
USS Arkansas (CGN-41)	USS Cushing (DD-985)	Strike Fighter Squadron 25: F/A-18C	Helicopter Anti-Submarine Squadron 8: SH-3H
USS England (CG-22)	USS Reuben James (FFG-57)	Attack Squadron 196: A-6E TRAM	——

The group completed a very successful deployment to the Persian Gulf in August 1994. In January 1996, the Carl Vinson Battle Group was redesignated the Carl Vinson Task Group, and Destroyer Squadron 5 was reassigned to Naval Surface Group Middle Pacific in Hawaii on 1 February 1996. The Carl Vinson Task Group successfully completed all predeployment examinations and deployed in May 1996 with USS Carl Vinson, USS Shiloh, USS Arkansas, USS California, USS Crommelin, USS Camden, USS Hawkbill, USS Jefferson City, and Carrier Air Wing Fourteen.

In June 1998 CCDG-3 deployed to the Persian Gulf. The deployment was the first on board the USS Abraham Lincoln. On 20 August 1998, the group took part in Operation Infinite Reach, launching Tomahawk cruise missiles against the Sudanese Al-Shifa pharmaceutical factory. This factory was suspected of assisting Osama bin Laden in making chemical weapons. The Battle Group also launched a second wave of Tomahawk cruise missiles against Bin Laden's terrorist training camps in Afghanistan. These cruise missile strikes were ordered by President Bill Clinton 13 days after terrorists bombed the U.S. embassies in Kenya and Tanzania. Rear Admiral Kevin Green transferred command of the group to incoming Rear Adm. Phillip Balisle on 3 December 1999, aboard the flagship Abraham Lincoln.

In 2002, the battle group deployed to the Persian Gulf to fly operations over Afghanistan the group carried out combat operations against Iraqi military forces during the 2003 invasion of Iraq.

The Abraham Lincoln Carrier Battle Group received a Navy Unit Commendation for its support of Operation Enduring Freedom, Operation Southern Watch, and Operation Iraqi Freedom during the period of 1 September 2001 to 30 April 2003, completing of an overseas deployment of 290 days. The Battle Group received its second NUC as part of the U.S. Fifth Fleet's battle/strike force, Task Force 50, during August 1998, and it received its third NUC for operations between 4 March to 1 May 2003.

The battle group also received a Meritorious Unit Commendation (MUC) for its support of Operation Southern Watch during the period of 11 June to 11 December 1998, in which was also included its support of Operation Infinite Reach. The Battle Group received a second MUC for its operations during the period of 1 January 1999 to 10 September 2001, including OSW air combat operations.

On 1 October 2004, Cruiser-Destroyer Group Three was re-designated as Carrier Strike Group 9.

== Command structure ==
When deployed overseas, the strike group comes under the command of the numbered fleet in whose area it is operating (Third, Fourth, Fifth, Sixth, or Seventh Fleets). When deployed like this, the group utilizes a task force or task group designator, for example, Task Group 50.1 in the Fifth Fleet area.

Group commanders since 2004 have been:

• Rear Admiral William Douglas Crowder	(20 July 2004 – 7 September 2005)
• Rear Admiral John W. (Bill) Goodwin	(7 September 2005 – 26 March 2007)
• Rear Admiral Scott R. Van Buskirk	(26 March 2007 – 9 October 2008)
• Rear Admiral Scott H. Swift	(9 October 2008 – 29 January 2009)
• Rear Admiral Mark D. Guadagnini	(29 January 2009 – 13 May 2011)
• Rear Admiral Troy M. (Mike) Shoemaker	(13 May 2011 – October 2012)
• Rear Admiral Patrick D. Hall	(October 2012 – August 2014)
• Rear Admiral Patrick A. Piercey	(August 2014 – August 2015)
• Rear Admiral Lisa M. Franchetti	(August 2015 – June 2016)
• Rear Admiral James S. Bynum	(June 2016 – June 2017)
• Rear Admiral Stephen T. Koehler	(June 2017 – June 2018)
• Rear Admiral Daniel W. Dwyer	(June 2018 – June 2019)
• Rear Admiral Stuart P. Baker	(June 2019 – June 2020)
• Rear Admiral Douglas C. Verissimo	(June 2020 – July 2021)
• Rear Admiral Robert B. Chadwick II	(July 2021 – June 2023)
• Rear Admiral Christopher D. Alexander	(June 2023 – June 2025)
• Rear Admiral Wilson Marks	(June 2025 – June 2026)
• Rear Admiral Marcos Jasso	(June 2026 – present)

== Operational history ==
=== 2004–2009 operations ===
Between 2004 and 2009, the strike group completed three Western Pacific deployments in support of Operation Enduring Freedom, the War in Iraq, and the War in Afghanistan, as well as providing support for regional Maritime Security Operations. Additionally, the group also participated in such major military exercises as RSOI/Foal Eagle 2006, Valiant Shield, and RIMPAC 2006, as well as Operation Unified Assistance, the U.S. military response to the aftermath of the 2004 Indian Ocean earthquake and tsunami. In recognition of its disaster-relief mission to Indonesia, the group received the Humanitarian Service Medal.

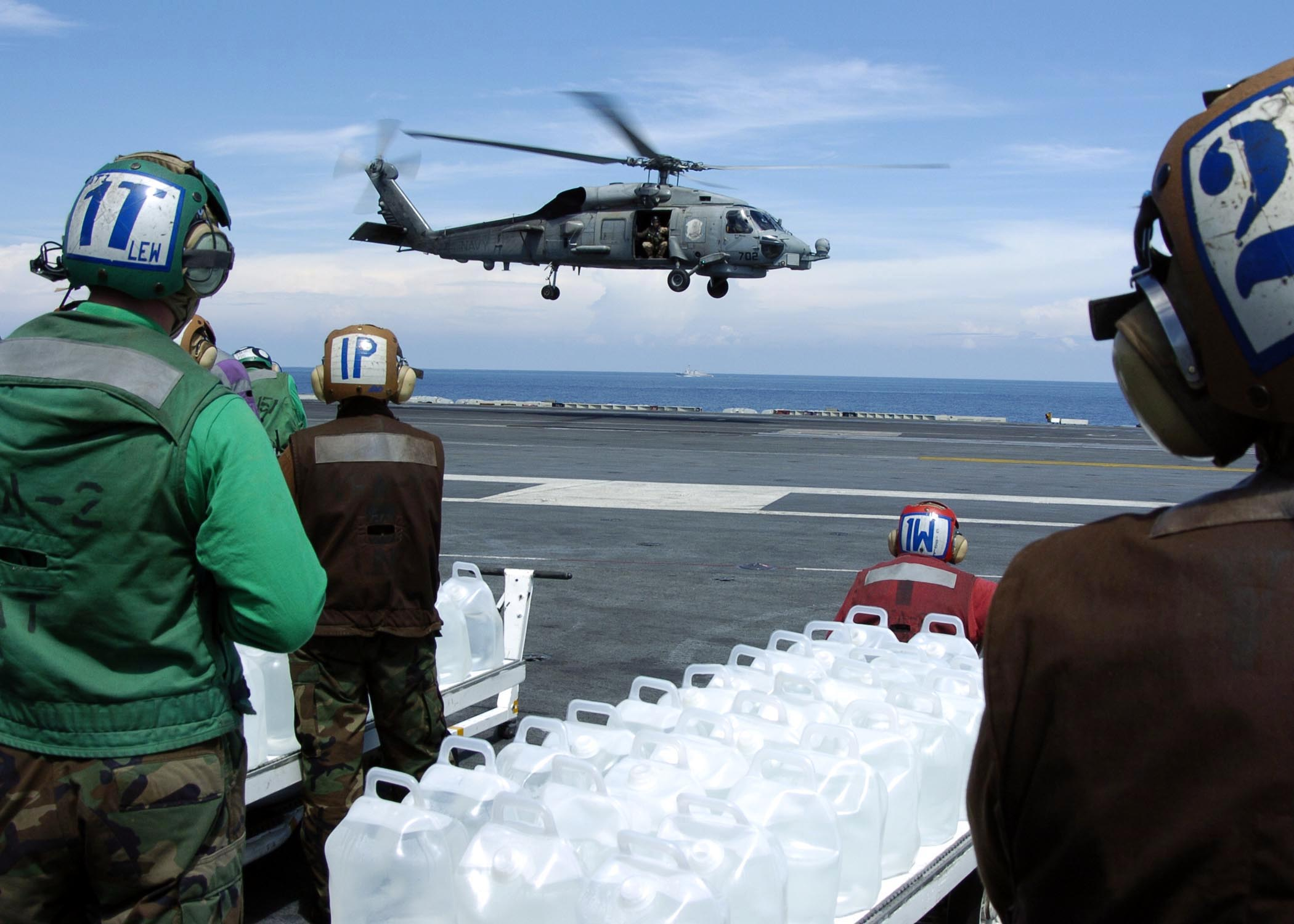
Operation Unified Assistance (11 January 2005)

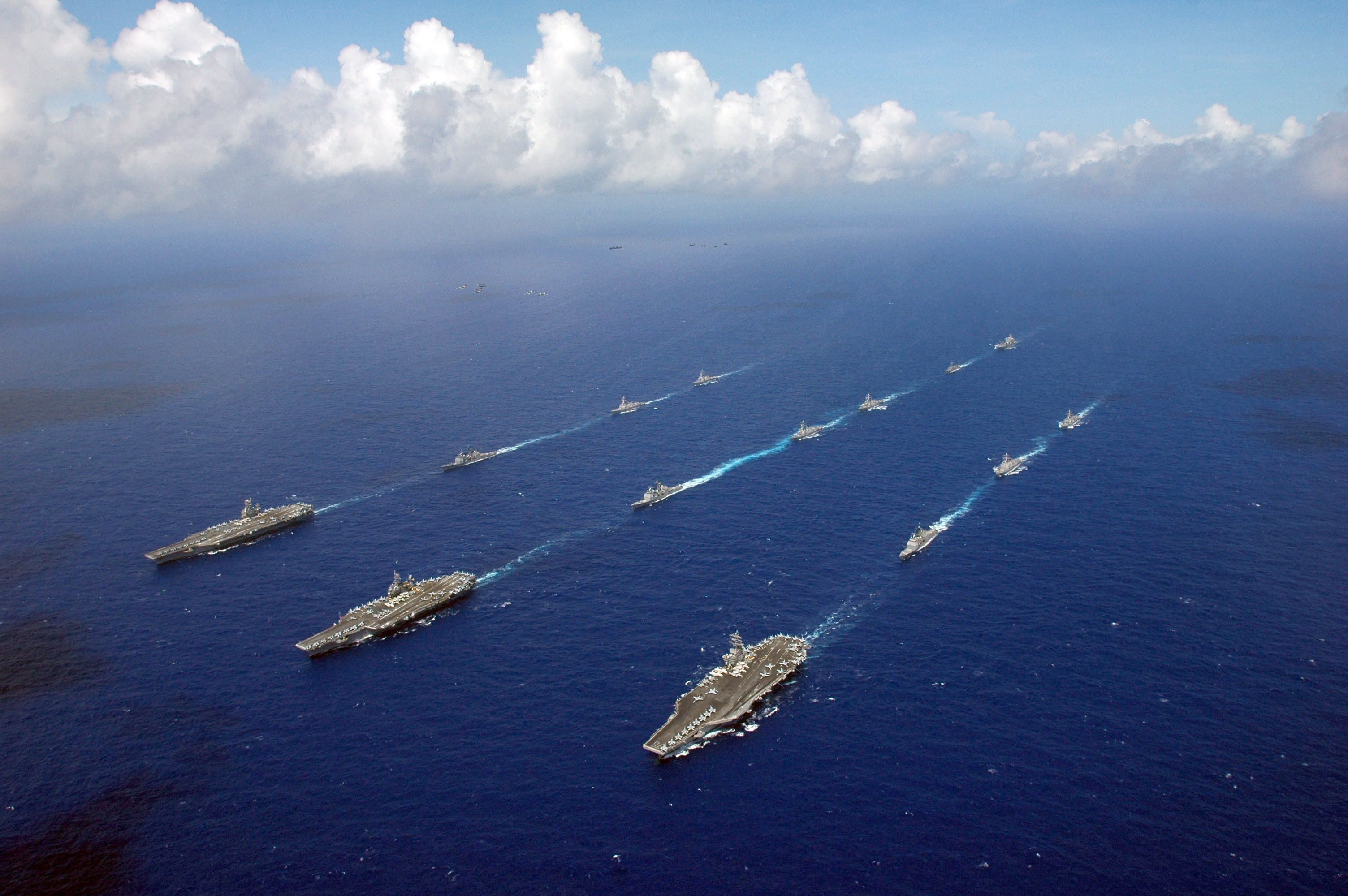
Valiant Shield 2006

During its 2004–2005 deployment, Carrier Strike Group 9 executed 4400 fixed-wing sorties and completed 4455 flight deck landings (traps) for a total of 7588 flight hours. Also, the group executed 1518 rotary-wing sorties for a total of 4401 flight hours, including flying 1737 humanitarian relief missions in support of Operation Unified Assistance (pictured) between 26 December 2004 and 3 February 2005 following the 2004 Indian Ocean earthquake and tsunami. The strike group received the Humanitarian Service Medal in recognition of its disaster relief efforts during this operation. Finally, helicopter squadron HSL-47 was the first LAMPS helicopter squadron deployed in its entirety on board an aircraft carrier, with the squadron providing LAMPS detachments to the other ships within the strike group while being supported by the carrier's aviation facilities.

During its 2006 deployment, the strike group participated in three major exercises, Foal Eagle, Valiant Shield and Exercise RIMPAC, as well as several passing exercises and port visits. Carrier Air Wing Two flew 7,871 sorties, with a total of 7,578 catapult launches from the flight deck of the carrier Abraham Lincoln. Also, on 15 April 2006, squadron HSL-47 helicopters and the guided-missile destroyer Russell provided aid to a fishing vessel in distress while operating in the South China Sea.

During its 2008 deployment, the strike group operated in the Persian Gulf and North Arabian Sea. It launched many sorties supporting U.S. troops in Afghanistan and Iraq. Carrier Air Wing Two (CVW-2) flew approximately 7,100 sorties, totaling more than 22,000 flight hours, which included 2,307 combat sorties that dropped 255,963 pounds (116,102,863.8 kg) of ordnance. Also, on 9 May, while operating with Combined Task Force 150, the guided-missile destroyer Shoup assisted a disabled dhow by towing it from the Gulf of Aden to Mukalla, Yemen.

The strike group's Composite Unit Training Exercise included Mobile Security Squadron 2 (MSRON-2), Helicopter Visit, Board, Search and Seizure (HVBSS) Team 1, a first for West Coast-based U.S. Navy ships. The Team specializes in boarding non-compliant ships at sea in the dead of night, detaining the crew if necessary, and identifying suspected terrorists or subjects of interest, using the element of surprise afforded by helicopter insertion and night vision equipment. MSRON-2 HVBSS Team 1 was established in 2004 at Norfolk Naval Shipyard in Portsmouth, Virginia, and it was the first team of its kind to reach operational status.

On 26 March 2007, Rear Admiral Scott R. Van Buskirk took command of the group, becoming only the second former nuclear submarine commanding officer to lead a carrier strike group. Admiral Van Buskirk subsequently commanded the U.S. Seventh Fleet and lead U.S. naval forces during Operation Tomodachi, providing assistance to Japan following the 2011 Tōhoku earthquake and tsunami.

=== 2010–2011 deployment ===
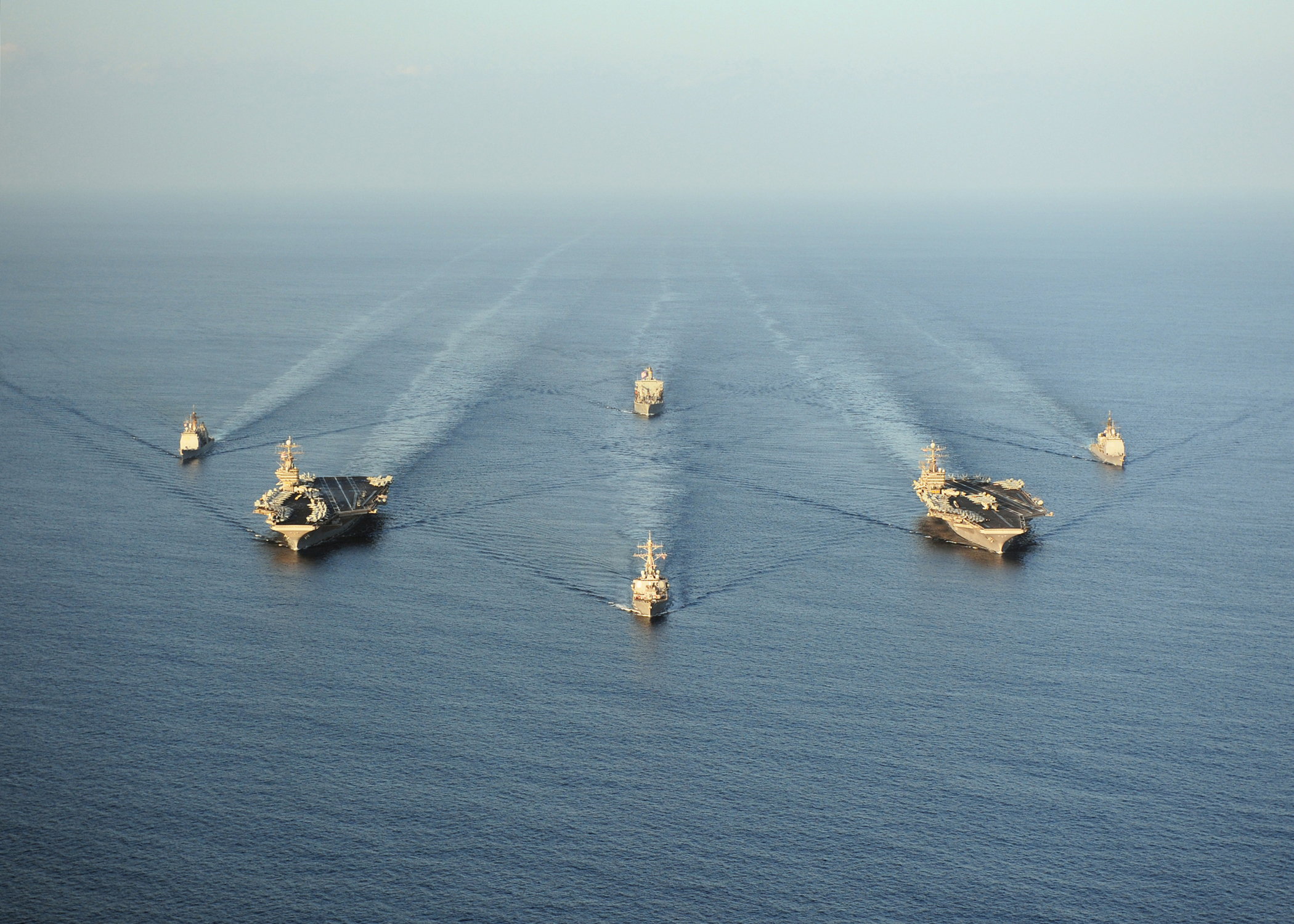
Task Force 50 underway in the Gulf of Oman (23 November 2010)

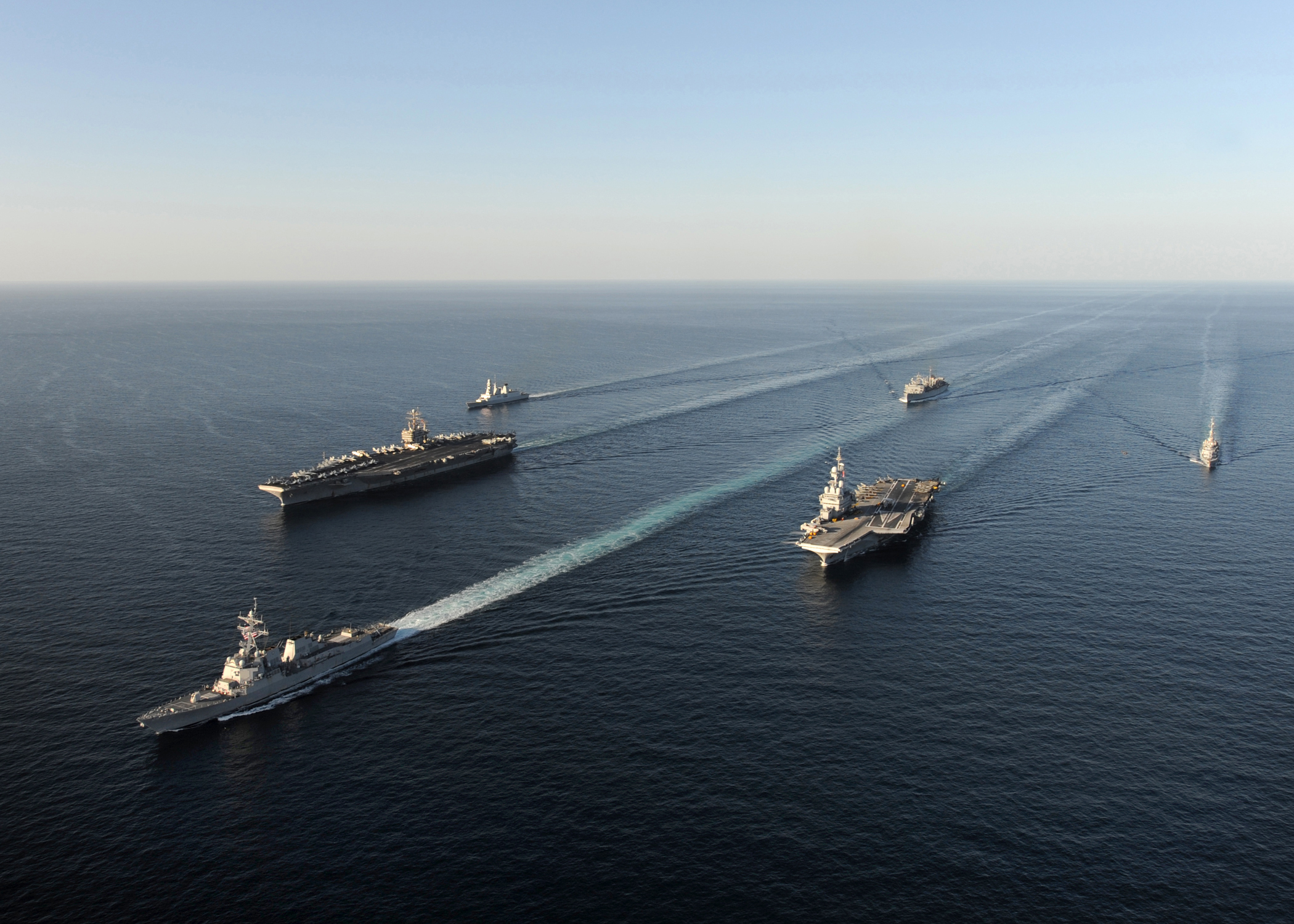
U.S.-French carrier force underway in the Persian Gulf (10 December 2010)

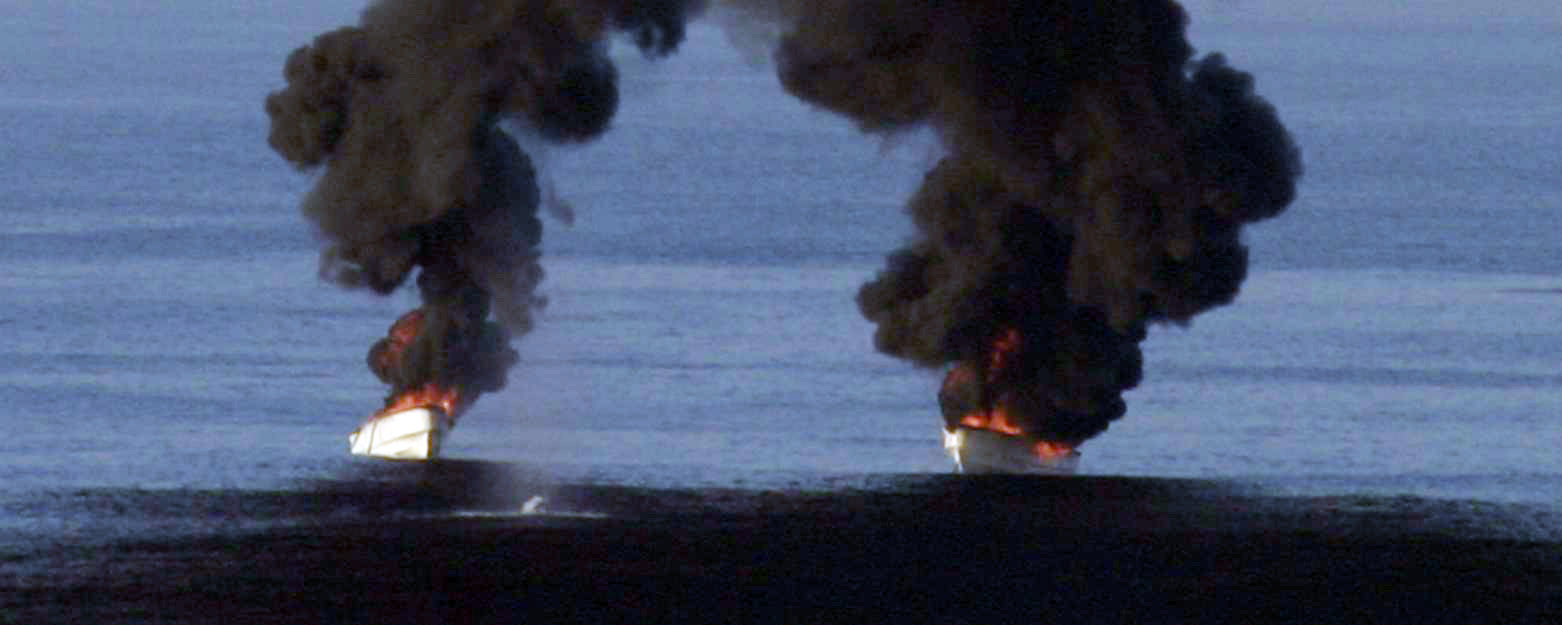
Anti-piracy operations in the Gulf of Oman (2 February 2011)

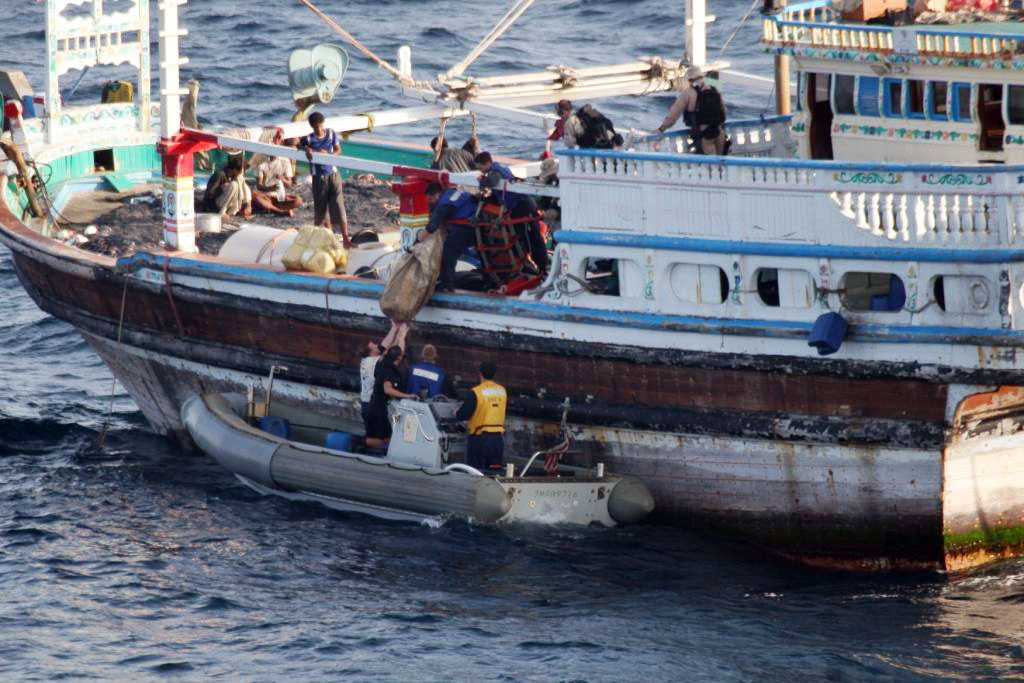
Rescue of Iranian fishing vessel (31 January 2011)

On 11 September 2010, the strike group departed Naval Base San Diego, for its 2010 deployment under the command of Rear Admiral Mark D. Guadagnini. While en route, the strike group executed carrier qualifications and anti-piracy training, as well as anti-submarine warfare exercises off Guam with the attack submarine Hawaii. On 25 September 2010, the strike group enter the U.S. Seventh Fleet area of responsibility. On 8 October 2010, the strike group paid its first foreign port call at Port Klang, Malaysia, which was followed by a multi-unit ASW exercises held on 23 October.

On 17 October 2010, the strike group arrived in the U.S. Fifth Fleet area, joining Carrier Strike Group Ten as part of Task Force 50 (pictured). For long-range air combat missions over Afghanistan, U.S. Air Force KC-135 and KC-10s provided aerial tanker support. The French carrier task group led by the Charles de Gaulle joined the strike group operating in the Persian Gulf (pictured). On 18 November 2010, the carrier Abraham Lincoln hosted seven ambassadors during a port visit to Manama, Bahrain, and on 6 December 2010, U.S. Secretary of Defense Robert M. Gates visited the Abraham Lincoln while operating in the Arabian Sea. A total of 999 War in Afghanistan-related sorties and 76 Operation New Dawn-related sorties were flown during the 2010–2011 Western Pacific deployment. On 28 December, with the carrier strike group operating in the Arabian Sea, Carrier Air Wing Two flew its 1000th sortie, amassing thus far a total of more than 5,884 hours flown supporting Afghanistan operations during this Western Pacific deployment. Carrier Strike Group Nine completed its final air operations over Afghanistan on 3 February 2011. Since 20 October 2010, Carrier Air Wing Two has launched more than 1,800 combat sorties in excess of 10,000 flight hours with a 100 percent completion rate for Afghanistan related missions. On 10 February 2011, Carrier Strike Group Nine completed its 45th day of at-sea operations, with Carrier Air Wing Two having launched over 7,000 sorties including nearly 2,000 directly supporting ground combat troops. Aircraft from Carrier Strike Group Nine also participated in joint aerial combat training exercises with the Royal Malaysian Air Force on 14 February 2011. On 22 February 2011, the strike group flagship Abraham Lincoln hosted a Brunei military delegation led by Deputy Minister of Defense Dato Paduka Mustappa Sirat.

Surface warships of Carrier Strike Group participated in maritime security operations during the group's 2010–2011 deployment with the U.S. Fifth Fleet. The guided-missile destroyer Halsey was assigned to counter-piracy operations in and around the Gulf of Aden, Arabian Sea, Indian Ocean, and Red Sea; and Momsen operated with Combined Task Force 152 in the Persian Gulf. On 5 December 2010, the Halsey and the French frigate Tourville participated in a bi-lateral naval gunnery exercise in the Arabian Sea to enhance coalition maritime forces training and coordination.

On 18 January 2011, a sailor from the guided-missile destroyer Halsey was reported overboard in the Gulf of Oman, initiating a search-and-rescue mission involving helicopters from the Halsey, the fast combat support ship USNS Rainier, and the British guided-missile frigate Cumberland, as well as land-based P-3 maritime patrol aircraft and FA-18 strike fighters from Carrier Air Wing Two based on the carrier Abraham Lincoln. On 19 January, the body of the missing sailor was recovered 75 miles (120.7 km) east of Fujairah, United Arab Emirates, and was identified as Petty Officer Dominique Cruz, 26, of Panama City, Florida.

On 31 January 2011, the cruiser Cape St. George responded to a distress call from a sinking Iranian dhow by dispatching a rescue team via a rigid-hulled inflatable boat (RHIB) (pictured). The U.S. naval team attempted to repair the dhow's dewatering pumps, but they were unable to stop the flooding. The Iranian fishermen were brought aboard the Cape St. George, where they were examined by the medical staff before being transferred to an Iranian customs vessel.

On 2 February 2011, the destroyer Momsen, with the cruiser Bunker Hill, responded to a distress call from the Panamanian-flag merchant vessel Duqm in the Gulf of Oman. Both ships disrupted a pirate attack on the Duqm, tracked the two pirate skiffs back to their mothership, and destroyed the two skiffs to prevent their use in future pirate attacks (pictured).

Following its rotation with the Fifth Fleet and the Seventh Fleet, the carrier Abraham Lincoln, with the destroyers Momsen and Shoup, arrived at Naval Air Station San Diego, California, on 19 March, and subsequently to their homeport of Everett, Washington, on 24 March 2011. The destroyer Halsey arrived at San Diego on 14 March 2011. Squadrons from Carrier Air Wing 2 also returned to their bases on 18 March.

During its 2010–2011 deployment, Carrier Air Wing Two flew more than 8,300 sorties and completed more than 23,500 flying hours, of which more than 3,600 sorties and almost 11,000 hours were flown in support of U.S. and coalition ground forces in Afghanistan. Carrier Strike Group Nine conducted military exercises with France, Bahrain, Malaysia, Singapore, Saudi Arabia, and Oman. Strike group warships Cape St. George, Sterett, Halsey, Momsen, and Shoup assisted mariners in distress and provided humanitarian assistance to more than 10 vessels. Finally, Helicopter Strike Maritime Squadron (HSM-77) was named as a top U.S. Navy helicopter squadron based on the U.S. west coast, earning a Battle "E" award.

2010–2011 deployment force composition

CARSTRKGRU 9 Warships	Carrier Air Wing Two (CVW-2) squadrons embarked aboard flagship USS Abraham Lincoln (CVN-72)	
USS Cape St. George (CG-71)	Strike Fighter Squadron 151 (VFA-151): 10 F/A-18C	Carrier Airborne Early Warning Squadron (VAW-116): 4 E-2C
USS Sterett (DDG-104)	Strike Fighter Squadron 137 (VFA-137): 12 F/A-18E	Helicopter Sea Combat Squadron 12 (HSC-12): 8 MH-60S
USS Halsey (DDG-97)	Strike Fighter Squadron 34 (VFA-34): 12 F/A-18C(N)	Fleet Logistics Support Squadron 30 (VRC-30), Det. 2: 2 C-2A
USS Momsen (DDG-92)	Strike Fighter Squadron 2 (VFA-2):: 12 F/A-18F	Helicopter Strike Maritime Squadron 77 (HSM-77), Det. 7: 8 SH-60B
USNS Rainier (T-AOE-7)	Tactical Electronics Warfare Squadron 131 (VAQ-131): 5 EA-6B	——

2010–2011 deployment exercises and port visits

Number	Regional Exercises				Port Visits		Notes
Number	Duration	U.S. Force	Bilateral/Multilateral Partner(s)	Operating Area	Location	Dates	Notes
1st:	——	Carrier Strike Group Nine	——	——	Port Klang, Malaysia	8 October 2010	
2nd:	——	Carrier Strike Group Nine	——	——	Hidd, Bahrain	18 November 2010	
3rd:	5 December 2010	USS Halsey (DDG-97)	Gunnery exercise (GUNEX): FS Tourville (D 610)	Arabian Sea	——	——	
4th:	——	Carrier Strike Group Nine	——	——	Dubai, UAE	23–27 December 2010	
5th:	——	USS Cape St. George (CG-71)	——	——	Phuket, Thailand	13 February 2011	
6th:	14 February 2011	Carrier Air Wing Two	Royal Malaysian Air Force	South China Sea	——	——	
7th:	——	USS Shoup (DDG-86)	——	——	Perth, Western Australia	16 Febr. 2011	
8th:	——	USS Abraham Lincoln (CVN-72)	——	——	Singapore	16 February 2011	
9th:	——	USS Shoup (DDG-86)	——	——	Hobart, Tasmania	23 February 2011	
10th:	——	USS Abraham Lincoln (CVN-72)	——	——	Pearl Harbor, Hawaii	10 March 2011	

=== 2011–2012 deployment ===
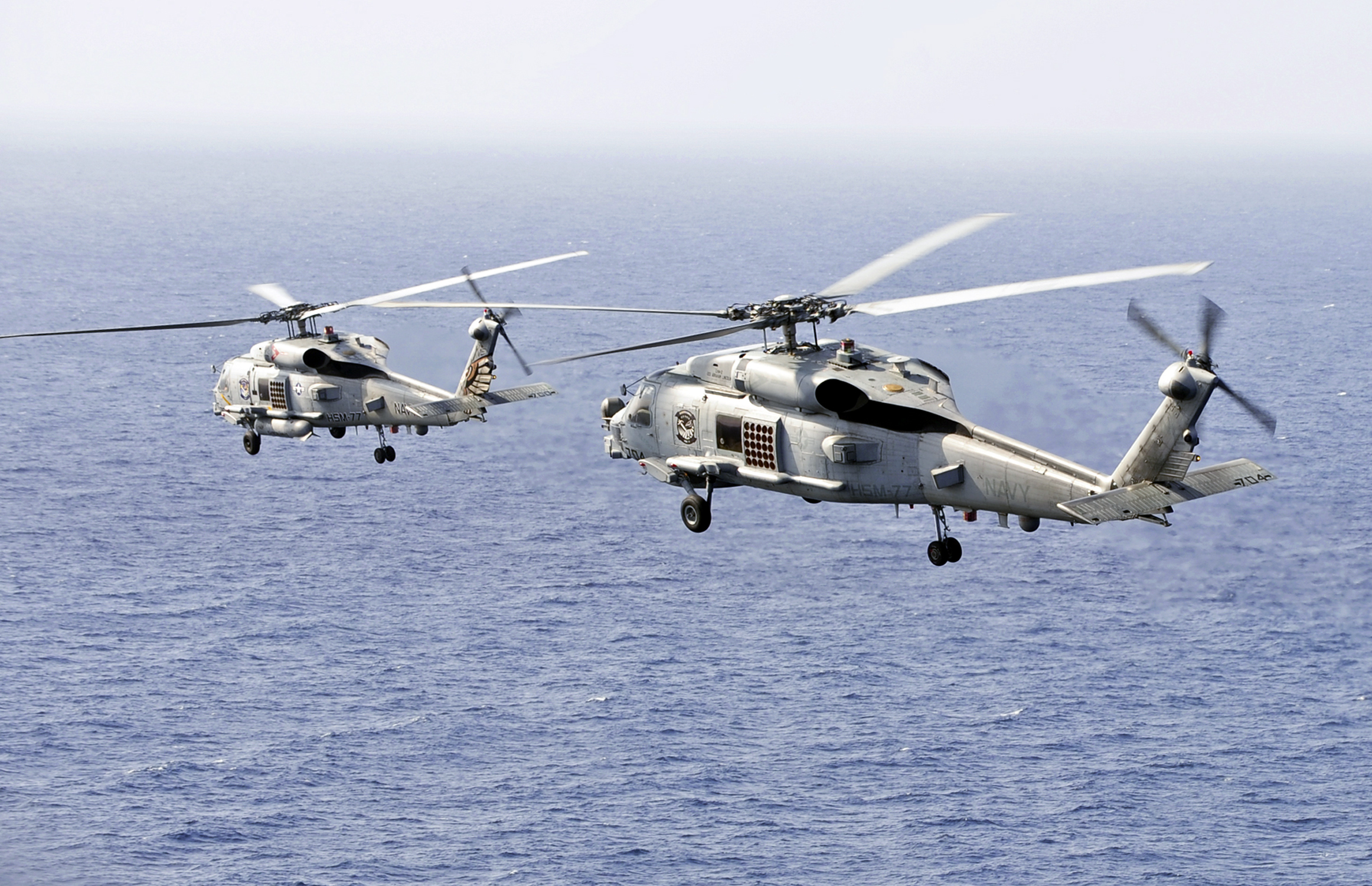
HSM-77 squadron SH-60B helicopters (5 January 2012)

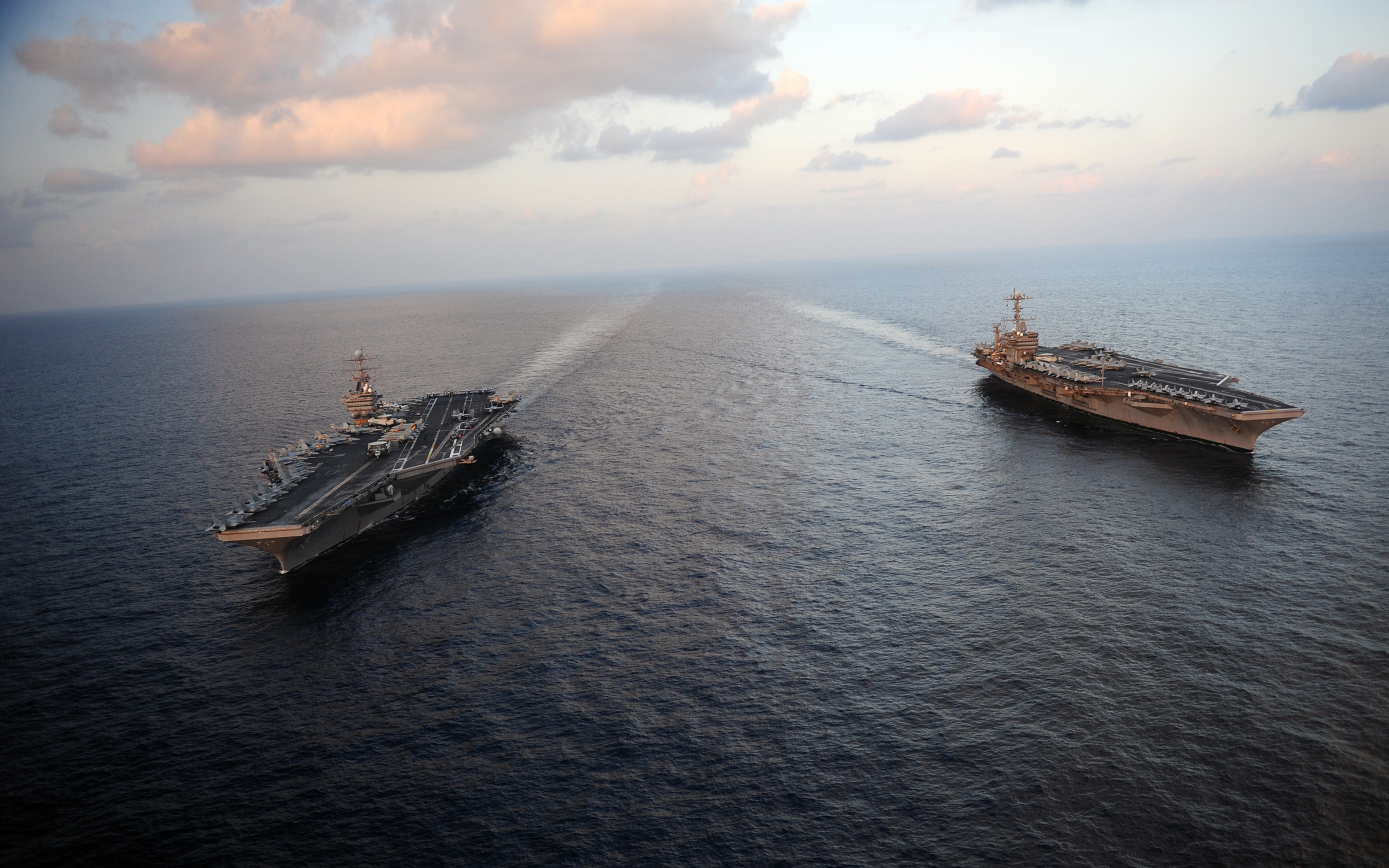
Abraham Lincoln and John C. Stennis (19 January 2012)

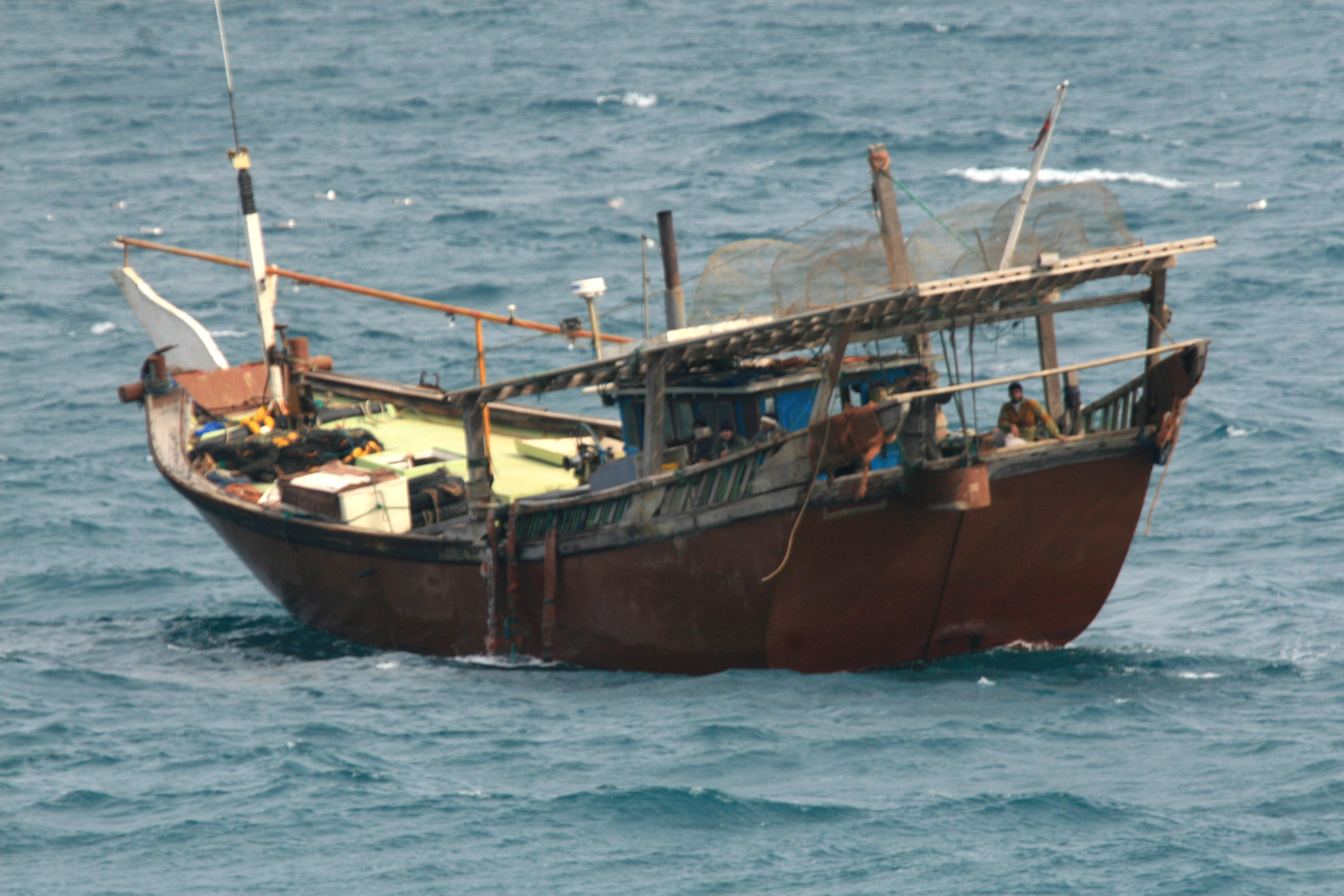
M/V Sohaila (31 January 2012)

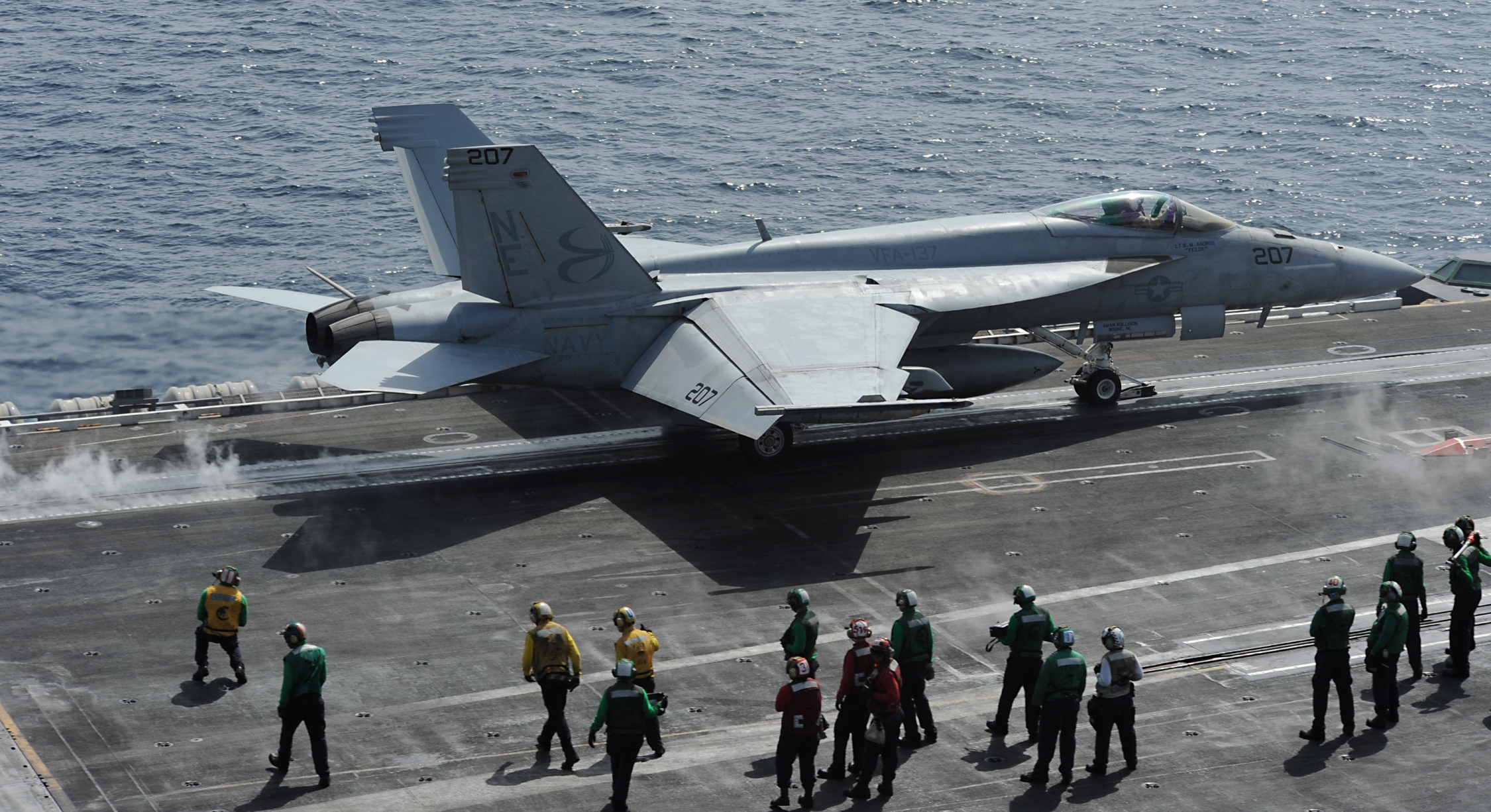
Flight operations (16 February 2012)

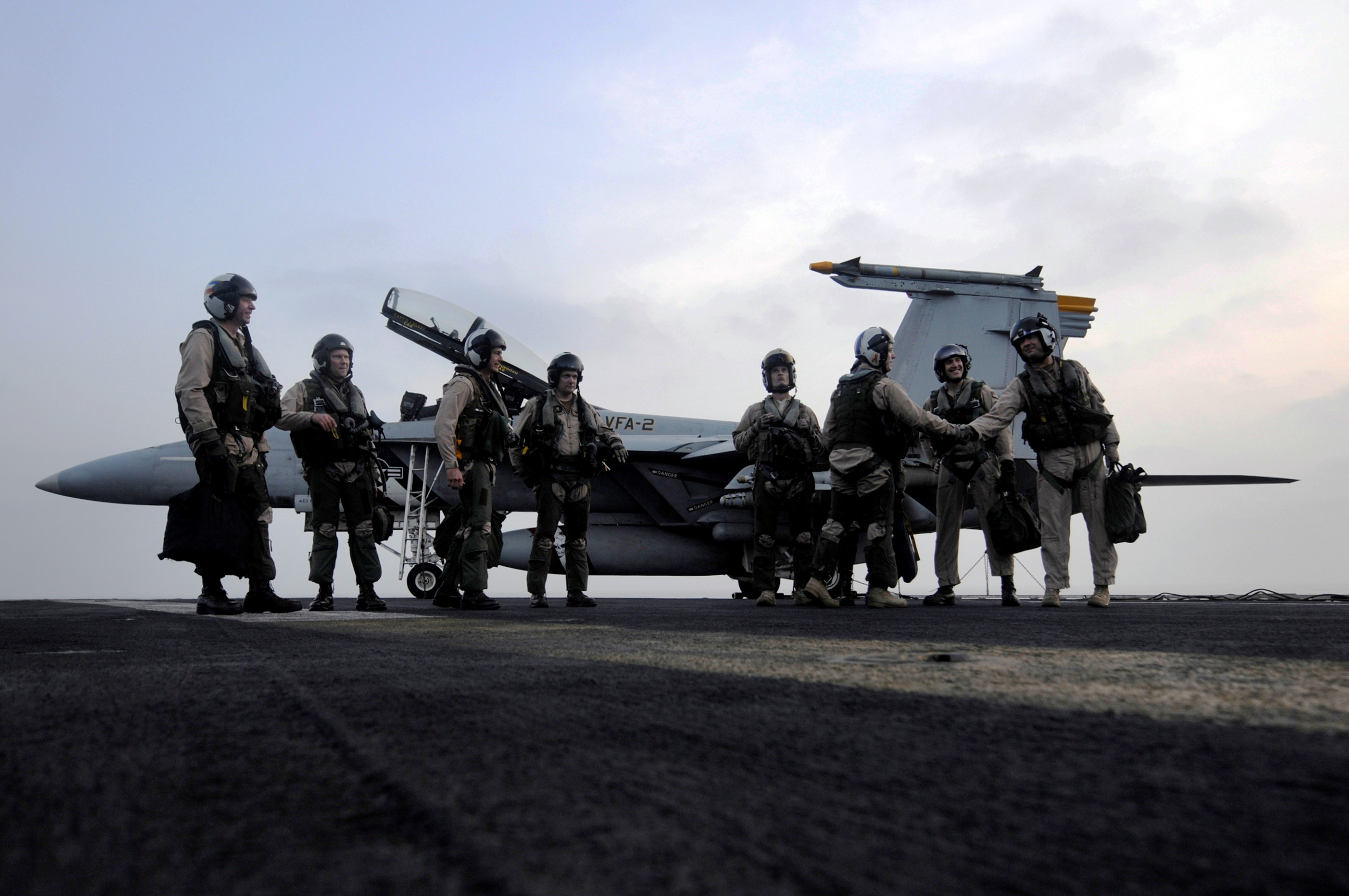
Flight operations (9 July 2012)

On 7 December 2011, the carrier Abraham Lincoln departed from Naval Station Everett, Washington, and the cruiser Cape St. George from Naval Base San Diego, California, to start their 2011-2011 deployment under the command of Rear Admiral Troy M. ("Mike") Shoemaker. The destroyer Sterett departed San Diego on 6 December 2011 to join up with the other units of Carrier Strike Group Nine.

On 13 December 2011, helicopter squadron HSM-77 flew from Naval Air Station North Island, California, to Carrier Strike Group Nine. Squadron HSM-77 as part of Carrier Air Wing Two aboard the carrier Abraham Lincoln. HSM-77 detachments Two, Three, and Five deployed earlier that month to the cruiser Cape St. George and the destroyers Sterret and USS Momsen, respectively, with two helicopters per detachment. The squadron serves as the eyes and ears for the carrier strike group, providing important anti-surface and anti-submarine warfare capabilities. Also, Squadron HSM-77 flew cross-country to return to NAS North Island following the conclusion of this deployment.

On 9 January 2012, Carrier Strike Groups 1 and 3, rendezvoused in the North Arabian Sea, while Carrier Strike Group Nine was en route to the Arabian Sea, amid rising tension between the United States and the Islamic Republic of Iran over U.S. naval access to the Strait of Hormuz. On 19 January 2012, Carrier Strike Group Nine entered the U.S. Fifth Fleet's area of responsibility and relieved Carrier Strike Group One (pictured).

On 22 January 2012, the group was joined by the British Type 23 frigate Argyll and French frigate La Motte-Picquet and together this American-British-French naval flotilla transited the Strait of Hormuz into the Persian Gulf without incident. Three weeks later, the carrier Abraham Lincoln, the cruiser Cape St. George, and the destroyer Sterett transited through Strait of Hormuz into the northern Arabian Sea on 14 February 2012, concluding Carrier Strike Group Nine's initial operations in the Persian Gulf. The strike group's movements were monitored by Iranian patrol boats and aircraft during its transit. In addition to combat air support for coalition forces in Afghanistan, Carrier Strike Group Nine maintained flights operations some 30 nautical miles (56 km; 35 mi) off the coast of Iran. Also, the new British guided-missile destroyer Daring operated with Carrier Strike Group One and Carrier Strike Group Nine in the Persian Gulf and North Arabian Sea, respectively, during that ship's maiden overseas deployment.

On 17 January 2012, the guided-missile destroyer Momsen conducted a boarding party with Explosive Ordnance Disposal Mobile Unit 1131 based on the aircraft carrier Abraham Lincoln. The EOD team fast-roped onto Momsen from a hovering helicopter from squadron HSC-12; such training exercises helped to maintain the proficiency and qualifications for both the EOD personnel and the helicopter pilots. Following that training exercise, the EOD team also conducted training with the Momsen's 12-man boarding party team. These exercises were vital in an anti-piracy and boarding operations.

On 31 January 2012, at 12:37pm local time, an MH-60S Seahawk helicopter from HSC-12 spotted a disabled Iranian fishing dhow, the M/V Sohaila, with nine crew members aboard (pictured). The dhow's distress call reported that Sohaila's engine had overheated, prevented the vessel from operating. A boarding team from the destroyer John Paul Jones responded and they were joined by a diving team from Explosive Ordnance Disposal Mobile Unit 1131 flown from Abraham Lincoln. The Sohaila's engine was repaired, and after determining that the Iranian mariners had ample supplies and fuel, the U.S. boarding party departed.

The guided-missile destroyer Sterrett served as the flagship for the Kuwaiti-led exercise Stakenet held 5–9 February 2012 in the Persian Gulf under the operational command of Combined Task Force 152 (CTF-152), the Persian Gulf maritime security task force of the Combined Maritime Forces (CMF) multilateral naval command. Warships that participated in Stakenet 2012 included the U.S. guided-missile destroyers Sterrett and John Paul Jones and the coastal patrol vessels Typhoon and Chinook; the British frigate Argyll; and the Kuwaiti fast-attack craft Al Nokhetna and Maskan. Air units included U.S. Army Apache attack helicopters, U.S. Navy P-3 maritime patrol aircraft, and U.S. Air Force F-16 fighters.

On 16 February 2012, from the North Arabian Sea, the carrier Abraham Lincoln and its embarked Carrier Air Wing Two began flying air combat missions in support of coalition ground forces in Afghanistan (pictured). To assist the strike group's combat air operations, U.S. Army ground liaison officers from the 4th Battlefield Coordination Detachment served as communications links between ground forces in Afghanistan and Carrier Air Wing Two. On 14 May 2012, during its 2012 deployment, HSM-77 Detachment Five completed its temporary operational rotation on board the British replenishment oiler Fort Victoria which was serving as the flagship for Combined Task Force 151. This was the first time that a MH-60R helicopter had ever operated from a Royal Navy ship. The detachment's helicopters primarily concentrated on anti-piracy surveillance missions during this two-week period. On 1 May 2012, Carrier Strike Group Twelve, led by the carrier Enterprise, joined Carrier Strike Group Nine, becoming the second carrier strike group currently operating in the Fifth Fleet's area of responsibility.

On 9 July 2012, Carrier Strike Group Nine concluded air combat operations in support of coalition ground forces in Afghanistan (pictured), having flown over 2,400 sorties in excess of 14,000 flight hours with a 100 percent completion rate during the 172 days the strike group operated in the U.S. Central Command area of responsibility. During the entire 2011–2012 deployment, aircraft from Carrier Air Wing Two flew over 11,000 sorties totaling in excess of 32,000 flight hours. This deployment is the final combat flight operations in support of Operation Enduring Freedom for Carrier Strike Group Nine, Carrier Air Wing Two, and the carrier Abraham Lincoln. On 16 July 2012, Carrier Strike Group Nine transited the Suez Canal and entered the U.S. Sixth Fleet's area of responsibility.

On 5 July 2012, the guided-missile destroyer Sterrett returned to Naval Base San Diego, California, completing a seven-month-long deployment to the U.S. Fifth Fleet as a unit of Carrier Strike Group Nine. On 7 August 2012, the aircraft carrier Abraham Lincoln arrived at its new homebase of Naval Station Norfolk, Virginia, to start its upcoming four-year-long, mid-life overhaul at the Newport News Shipbuilding shipyard. During its 2011–2012 deployment, the Abraham Lincoln steamed over 72,000 nautical miles (133,000 km; 83,000 mi) over 245 days underway, including 105 days in the Arabian Sea supporting coalition forces in Afghanistan.

2011–2012 deployment force composition

CARSTRKGRU 9 Warships	Carrier Air Wing Two (CVW-2) squadrons embarked aboard flagship USS Abraham Lincoln (CVN-72)	
USS Cape St. George (CG-71)	Strike Fighter Squadron 151 (VFA-151): 10 F/A-18C	Carrier Airborne Early Warning Squadron (VAW-116): 4 E-2C
USS Sterett (DDG-104)	Strike Fighter Squadron 137 (VFA-137): 12 F/A-18E	Helicopter Sea Combat Squadron 12 (HSC-12): 8 MH-60S
USS Momsen (DDG-92)	Strike Fighter Squadron 34 (VFA-34): 12 F/A-18C(N)	Fleet Logistics Support Squadron 30 (VRC-30), Det. 2: 2 C-2A
——	Strike Fighter Squadron 2 (VFA-2): 12 F/A-18F	Helicopter Strike Maritime Squadron 77 (HSM-77), Det. 7: 8 SH-60B
——	Tactical Electronics Warfare Squadron 131 (VAQ-131): 5 EA-6B	——

2011–2012 deployment exercises and port visits

Number	Regional Exercises				Port Visits		Notes
Number	Duration	U.S. Force	Bilateral/Multilateral Partner(s)	Operating Area	Location	Dates	Notes
1st:	——	Abraham Lincoln, Cape St. George	——	——	Laem Chabang, Thailand	6–10 January 2012	
2nd:	——	Sterett, Momsen	——	——	Port Klang, Malaysia	6–12 January 2012	
3rd:	——	Abraham Lincoln, Cape St. George	——	——	Khalifa Bin Salman Port, Bahrain	31 January – 5 February 2012	
4th:	5–9 February 2012	Sterett	Stakenet: CTF-152	Persian Gulf	Hidd, Bahrain	13 March 2012	
5th:	——	Momsen	——	——	Salalah, Oman	5 March 2012	
6th:	——	Abraham Lincoln, Cape St. George	——	——	Jebel Ali, U.A.E.	13–17 March 2012	
7th:	——	Momsen	——	——	Jebel Ali, U.A.E.	26 March 2012	
8th	22 April 2012	Sterett	Arabian Shark 2012 (Note: In addition to Sterett, the other U.S. Navy ship was the nuclear submarine USS Pittsburgh (SSN-720). Royal Navy ships included the frigate HMS Westminster (F237) and a Trafalgar-class nuclear submarine. The Saudi Navy provided two corvettes, Hitteen and Badr. The Pakistani Navy provided the frigate Badr.)	Arabian Sea	Yokosuka, Japan	11–16 June 2012	
9th	——	Abraham Lincoln	——	——	Hidd, Bahrain	2–6 May 2012	
10th	3–7 June 2012	Cape St. George	HMS Daring (D32)	Arabian Sea	Valletta, Malta	19–23 May 2012	
11th	——	Abraham Lincoln	——	——	Jebel Ali, UAE	21 June 2012	
12th:	——	Momsen	——	——	Pearl Harbor, Hawaii	28 June 2012	
13th:	——	Abraham Lincoln	——	——	Antalya, Turkey	17–22 July 2012	
14th	——	Abraham Lincoln	——	——	Naval Station Mayport	4 August 2012	

=== Homeport & flagship change-over ===
On 9 December 2010, the U.S. Navy announced that Abraham Lincoln will undergo its scheduled four-year Refueling and Complex Overhaul at the Newport News Shipbuilding shipyard in Virginia. The refit was scheduled to begin in 2013. On 1 August 2011, the Navy announced that the group would change station from Naval Station Everett to Naval Base San Diego, effective 14 December 2012. The carrier USS Ronald Reagan (CVN-76) has been reassigned as the group flagship following the de-activation of Carrier Strike Group Seven. On 10 January 2012, Ronald Reagan sailed into Puget Sound Naval Shipyard for its 12-month, US$218 million docking planned incremental availability (DPIA) overhaul. Ronald Reagan completed its year-long dry-docked maintenance overhaul at the Puget Sound Naval Shipyard & Intermediate Maintenance Facility in Bremerton, Washington, and on 18 March 2013, departed for San Diego, arriving on 21 March 2013.

=== 2013–2015 operations ===
On 18 November 2013, Carrier Strike Group Nine completed its four-day Fleet Synthetic Training-Joint (FST-J) exercise. Such FST-J exercises simulate virtual at-sea training involving real-world battle scenarios while the ships of the strike group remained docked in port. Such in-port training allowed shipboard maintenance to be done without delaying required training for upcoming deployments. This FST-J exercise also involved joint forces training in tactics and operations, with units of the U.S. Navy, the U.S. Army, and the U.S. Air Force participating.

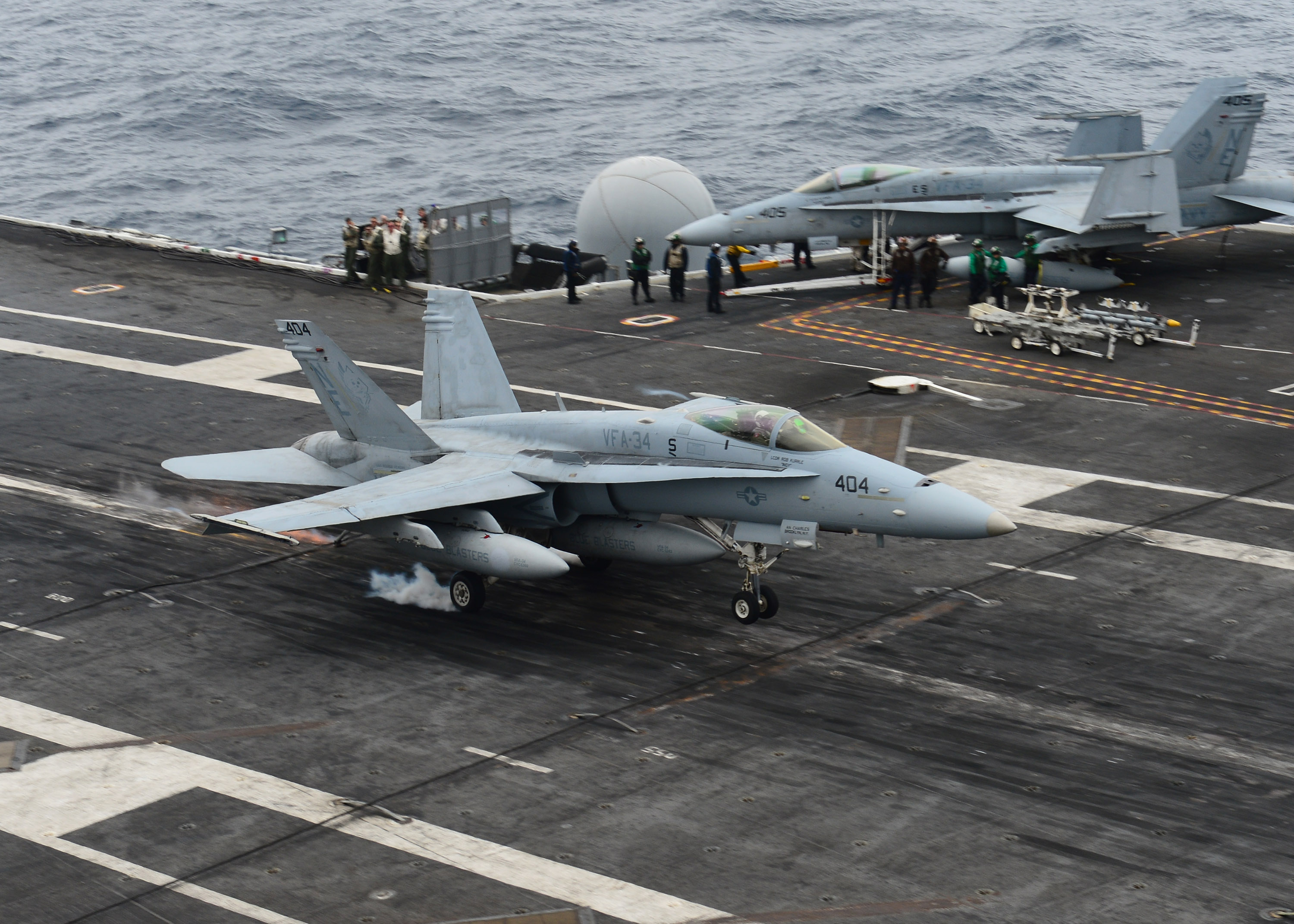
Tailored Ship's Training Availability (18 March 2014)

On 18 November 2013, Carrier Strike Group Nine completed its independent deployer certification exercise (IDCERTEX) held in the U.S. Third Fleet area of operations. The two-phase IDCERTEX involved intermediate and advanced training for the strike group across the full spectrum of naval warfare operations. The first phase involved such unit-level training as shipboard firefighting; man overboard drills; visit, board, search, and seizure (VBSS); and other ship-specific functions. The second phase involved integrated training between the ships and aircraft of the strike group, and it consisted of flight operations, submarine tracking, strait transit formations, replenishment-at-sea, and other required mission operations.

On 27 November 2013, Carrier Strike Group Nine was underway to complete its Tailored Ship's Training Assessment (TSTA) pre-deployment exercises as well as prepare for its upcoming Final Evaluation Problem (FEP) exercises. TSTA exercises are designed to prepare the carrier strike group for sustained at-sea combat operations. This involves the strike group conducting multiple combat missions simultaneously as well as testing shipboard damage control readiness.

Between 4–12 December 2013, the USS Ronald Reagan was underway conducting routine training in the southern California operations area, and at the start of 2014, the carrier was in port and not underway. Between 23 and 30 January 2014, the Reagan departed Naval Station San Diego, California, for carrier qualifications prior to undertaking exercises for Carrier Strike Group Nine. On 17 March 2014, the Reagan resumed its Tailored Ship's Training Availability (TSTA) pre-deployment training exercises (pictured).

On 17 April 2015, Ronald Reagan departed Naval Air Station North Island, California, for sea trials following the completion of its seven-month Planned Incremental Availability (PIA) refit and upkeep cycle. The Reagan subsequently completed CVW-11/FRS/TRACOM carrier qualifications (CQ) and Combat System Ship's Qualification Trials (CSSQT) before on-loading ammunition from the dry cargo ship USNS Cesar Chavez (T-AKE-14).

2013–2014 exercises and port visits

Number	Exercises/Operations				Port Visits		Notes
Number	Duration	U.S. Force	Joint/Bilateral/Multilateral Partner(s)	Operating Area	Location	Dates	Notes
1st:	14–18 Oct 2012	Carrier Strike Group Nine	FST-J: Tactical Training Group Pacific (TTGP)	In-port	——	——	
2nd:	8–18 Nov 2013	Carrier Strike Group Nine (Note: USS Ronald Reagan (CVN-76), Carrier Air Wing Two, USS Lake Champlain (CG-57), USS Wayne E. Meyer (DDG-108), USS Kidd (DDG-100), USS Momsen (DDG-92), USS Pinckney (DDG-91), USS Howard (DDG-83), and USS Gary (FFG-51).)	IDCERTEX: U.S. Third Fleet	Eastern Pacific Ocean	——	——	
3rd:	30 Oct to 15 November 2013	Carrier Strike Group Nine	FEP/TSTA: Afloat Training Group Pacific (ATGPAC)	Eastern Pacific Ocean	——	——	
5th:	17 March 2014	Carrier Strike Group Nine	TSTA: Afloat Training Group Pacific (ATGPAC)	Eastern Pacific Ocean	——	——	
5th:	26 Jun – 1 August 2014	Carrier Strike Group Nine	RIMPAC	Mid-Pacific	——	——	

=== Unit changes ===
On 14 January 2014, the U.S. Navy announced that the Ronald Reagan will replace the USS George Washington (CVN-73) as the flagship of Carrier Strike Group Five, the only forward-based carrier strike group home-ported at Yokosuka, Japan, as part of the U.S. Seventh Fleet. The George Washington is scheduled to undergo its mid-life complex refueling and overhaul at Newport News Shipbuilding shipyard in Newport News, Virginia.

== See also ==
- History of the United States Navy
- List of United States Navy aircraft squadrons

== Sources ==
- Morison, Samuel Loring (September 2014). "U.S. Battle Force Aviation Changes 2013–14". Naval Institute Proceedings. 140 (4): 48–50. ISSN 0041-798X. "Registration required' covers 2013–2014."
- —— (May 2009). "U.S. Naval Battle Force Changes 1 January 2008–31 December 2008: Aircraft Carrier Air Wing Assignments and Composition as of 17 February 2009". Naval Institute Proceedings. 135 (5): 118–120. ISSN 0041-798X. "Registration required."
- —— (May 2010). "U.S. Naval Battle Force Changes 1 January 2009–31 December 2009: Aircraft Carrier Air Wing Assignments and Composition as of 1 March 2010". Naval Institute Proceedings. 136 (5): 106–116. ISSN 0041-798X. "Registration required."
- —— (May 2011). "U.S. Naval Battle Force Changes 1 January 2010–31 December 2010: Aircraft Carrier Air Wing Assignments and Composition as of 1 March 2011". Naval Institute Proceedings. 137 (5): 117–120. ISSN 0041-798X. "Registration required."
- —— (May 2012). "U.S. Naval Battle Force Changes 1 January 2011–31 December 2011: Aircraft Carrier Air Wing Assignments and Composition as of 2 April 2012". Naval Institute Proceedings. 138 (5): 112. ISSN 0041-798X. "Registration required."
