= HSM-77 Saberhawks =

Helicopter Maritime Strike Squadron Seven Seven (HSM-77)
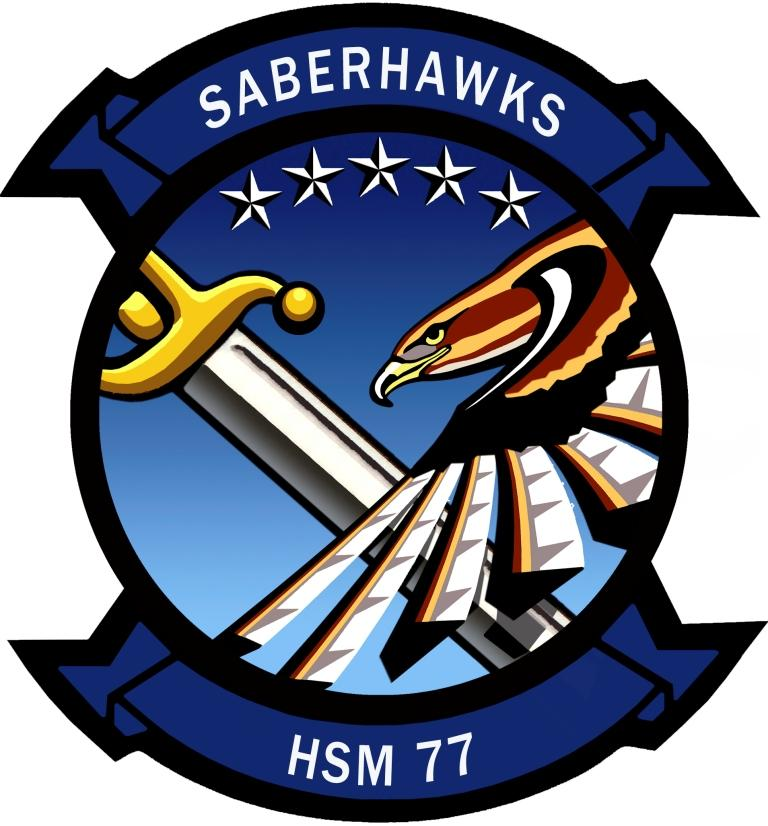
- HSM-77 Insignia
- Active: 25 September 1987 to present
- Country: United States of America
- Branch: United States Navy
- Type: Navy Helicopter Squadron
- Role: Surface Warfare (SUW); Anti-Submarine Warfare (ASW)
- Part of: CVW-5; Commander, Helicopter Maritime Strike Wing Pacific
- Garrison/HQ: NAF Atsugi, Japan
- Nickname: "Saberhawks"
- Engagements: Operation Earnest Will; Gulf War; Operation Desert Shield; Operation Desert Storm; Operation Enduring Freedom; Operation Iraqi Freedom; Global War on Terror; Operation New Dawn; Operation Epic Fury

Commanders
- Current commander: CDR Timothy G. Boyce

Helicopter Maritime Strike Squadron Seven Seven (HSM-77) "Saberhawks" is a United States Navy helicopter squadron based at Naval Air Facility, Atsugi, Japan. HSM-77 is attached to Carrier Air Wing Five and deploys aboard the George Washington (CVN-73) and air capable ships attached to Carrier Strike Group Five (CSG-5). The squadron was established as Helicopter Antisubmarine Squadron (Light) Forty Seven (HSL-47) on 25 September 1987 and was redesignated HSM-77 on 2 Apr 2009.

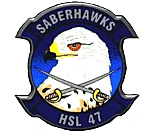
Squadron insignia during period of designation as HSL-47

== Mission ==
The squadron's primary mission is to employ the versatility of the MH-60R helicopter to support the battle group commander's objectives, with emphasis on Surface Warfare (SUW) and Anti-Submarine Warfare (ASW). Secondary missions include Search and Rescue (SAR), Vertical Replenishment (VERTREP), Medical Evacuation (MEDEVAC), Naval Surface Fire Support (NSFS), and Communications Relay (COMREL). The Saberhawks of HSM-77 fly the newest aircraft in the U.S. Navy fleet, the MH-60R Seahawk helicopter, which elevates tactical maritime mission capability to a new level, far surpassing previous fleet capability. With its state-of-the-art avionics, mission systems, and cockpit, the MH-60R is the world's most capable Naval helicopter. The aircraft features a glass cockpit and significant mission system improvements over the SH-60B, which give the MH-60R unmatched capability as an airborne multi-mission Naval platform. The MH-60R is tasked with performing Anti-Submarine Warfare, Surface Warfare, Over-the-Horizon Targeting (OTH-T) on board aircraft carriers and Navy surface combatant ships.

== History ==
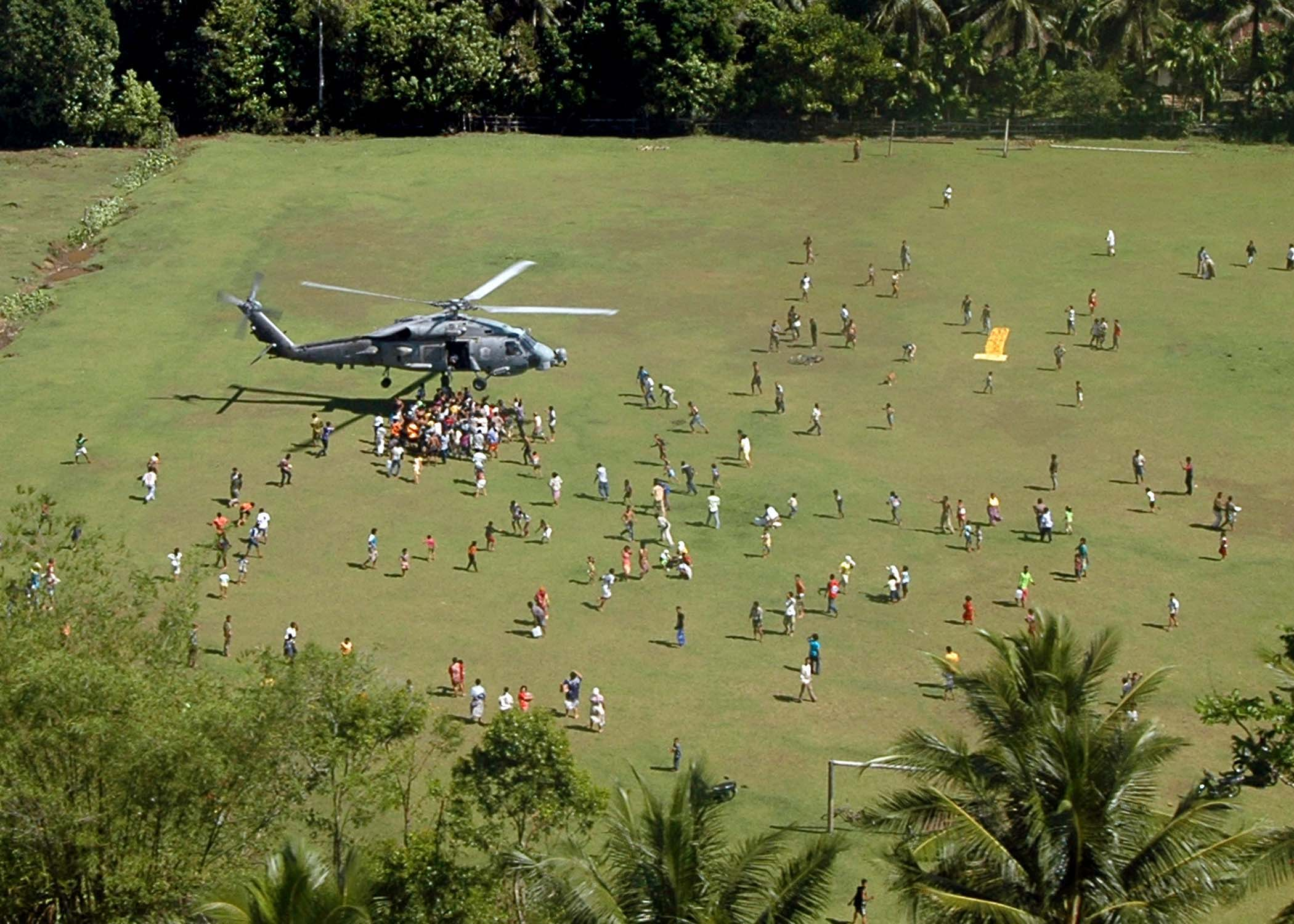
An SH-60B of HSL-47 providing disaster relief in Sumatra

Helicopter Maritime Strike Squadron SEVEN SEVEN "Saberhawks" began its history as Helicopter Anti-Submarine Squadron Light FOUR SEVEN (HSL-47). Established on 25 September 1987 at NAS North Island, the Saberhawks of HSL-47 employed the SH-60B helicopter. Since its inception, the Saberhawks have been the lead of helicopter operations in the Pacific Fleet. In 1991, HSL-47 deployed five detachments in support of Operations Desert Shield and Desert Storm, and flew over 2,000 combat, combat support and contingency hours. The Saberhawks also played a major role in Operation Southern Watch, providing seventeen detachments from 1992–2005. In 1992, Detachment TWO rendered the first assistance to Somali citizens during Operation Restore Hope. HSL-47 deployed the first SH-60B (Armed Helo) detachment (Detachment 4) on an aircraft carrier, USS Constellation, in 2001 and 2002-2003 (Operation Iraqi Freedom). Detachment 4 helped make the way for HSL-47 to become the first HSL Squadron to become an integrated part of the Carrier Air Wing. The Squadron joined the Broadswords of Carrier Air Wing TWO (CVW-2) on 1 April 2004, bringing eight SH-60B helicopters for their first deployment. Under the Navy's Helo CONOPS "Bravo to Sea (B2C)" initiative, HSL-47 led the LAMPS Community's transition from traditional SH-60B expeditionary operations, to carrier based MH-60R operations.

During its 2004–2005 deployment, HSL-47 became the first LAMPS helicopter squadron deployed in its entirety on board an aircraft carrier, Abraham Lincoln, with the squadron providing LAMPS detachments to the other ships within Carrier Strike Group Nine. HSL-47 detachments operated two helicopters from the guided-missile cruiser Cape St. George as well as two from the guided-missile destroyer Shoup.

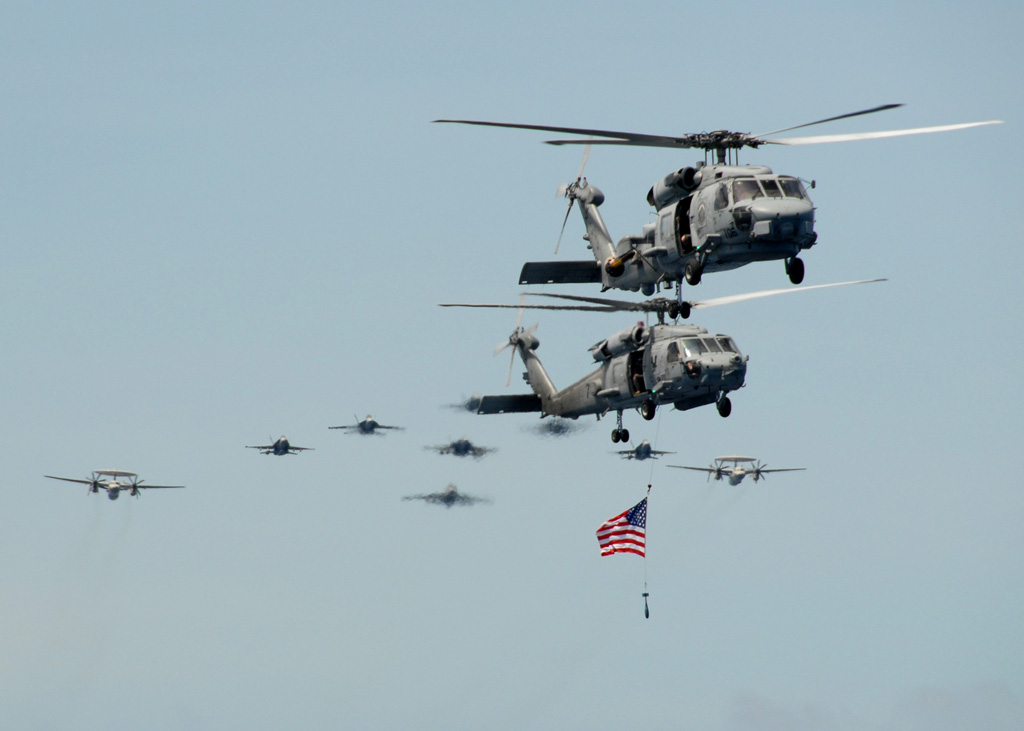
HSL-47 leads an airwing flyby on board USS Abraham Lincoln

Following the devastating tsunami in the Indian Ocean on 26 December 2004, HSL-47 and the Abraham Lincoln Carrier Strike Group sped to assist the Indonesian island of Sumatra. Arriving on 31 December, the Saberhawks flew a total of 1,223 hours, distributing 404,647 lbs of food, 190,246 lbs of water and supplies, and conducting seventy medical evacuations. Prior to their 2006 deployment, HSL-47 took part in their first Air Wing Fallon in 2005, and also flew mission in response to Hurricane Katrina. In support of Hurricane Katrina relief efforts, HSL-47, conducted 173 rescues and delivered 76,000 pounds of food, water, and medical supplies over nineteen days.

For its 2006 Deployment, two SH-60B Seahawk aviation repairable pack-up kits, including four aviation consumable Vidmar cabinets, were transferred from Naval Air Station North Island, California, to the carrier Abraham Lincoln. This equipment was required to support the second deployment on board Abraham Lincoln of the SH-60B-To-Carrier Pilot program that assigned the carrier to direct support of squadron HSL-47, a full squadron of SH-60B Seahawk helicopters that would be dispersed throughout the carrier strike group. On 15 April 2006, HSL-47 helicopters and the guided-missile destroyer Russell provided aid to a fishing vessel in distress while operating in the South China Sea. Following the completion of its 2006 deployment, the two SH-60B Seahawk aviation repairable pack-up kits, including four aviation consumable Vidmar cabinets, were returned to Naval Air Station North Island.

On 2 April 2009, HSL-47 transitioned to Helicopter Maritime Strike Squadron SEVEN SEVEN. The Saberhawks were attached to CVW-2 and the Abraham Lincoln Strike Group and deployed for the first time with the MH-60R.

On 14 May 2012, during its 2012 deployment, HSM-77 Detachment Five completed its temporary operational rotation on board the British replenishment oiler Fort Victoria which was serving as the flagship for Combined Task Force 151. This was the first time that a MH-60R helicopter had ever operated from a Royal Navy ship. The detachment's helicopters primarily concentrated on anti-piracy surveillance missions during this two-week period.

In early 2013, the squadron executed a homeport change from NAS North Island, California to NAF Atsugi, Japan, to join the USS George Washington Carrier Strike Group and Carrier Air Wing 5 (CVW-5). Four months after settling into Japan, the squadron took part in two SEVENTH Fleet patrols on board George Washington and Antietam. The patrols allowed the Saberhawks to prove their capabilities during numerous multinational training exercises including Talisman Saber 2013, Maritime Counter Special Operations Forces exercises, and Annualex. Additionally, the Saberhawks participated in Operation Damayan, providing Humanitarian Assistance/Disaster Relief in response to Super Typhoon Haiyan. During the eight-day operation, the Saberhawks safely flew six aircraft from sunrise to sunset for a total of 75 sorties and 392 mishap-free flight hours. The squadron delivered 183,920 pounds of food, 6,417 gallons of water, 2,000 pounds of medical supplies, and safely transported 59 refugees and six medevacs. As of August 2015, the squadron operates aboard USS Ronald Reagan Carrier Strike Group as a member of Carrier Air Wing 5 (CVW-5) in support of Forward Deployed Naval Forces Japan.

In August 2026, HSM-77 as part of CVW-5 onboard the USS George Washington arrived in the CENTCOM AOR. HSM-77 and their MH-60Rs then began undertaking combat missions against Iran within Operation Epic Fury

=== Command history ===
| Commander | Start date | End date |
|---|---|---|
| CDR J. D. McAfee | 25 September 1987 | 9 September 1988 |
| CDR D. A. Rannells | 9 September 1988 | 1 September 1989 |
| CDR J. C. Boyer | 1 September 1989 | 6 September 1990 |
| CDR T. M. Naple | 6 September 1990 | 16 August 1991 |
| CDR R. J. Vernon | 16 August 1991 | 6 November 1992 |
| CDR M. N. Wellman | 6 November 1992 | 10 February 1994 |
| CDR I. P. Fetterman | 10 February 1994 | 25 May 1995 |
| CDR J. R. Campbell | 25 May 1995 | 5 September 1996 |
| CDR L. J. McCoy | 5 September 1996 | 21 November 1997 |
| CDR T. J. Culora | 21 November 1997 | 3 June 1999 |
| CDR G. S. Smith | 3 June 1999 | 5 October 2000 |
| CDR C. S. Chesnutt | 5 October 2000 | 7 February 2002 |
| CDR M. J. Pringle | 7 February 2002 | 8 May 2003 |
| CDR M. K. Hannan | 8 May 2003 | 24 August 2004 |
| CDR F. J. Michael | 24 August 2004 | 8 December 2005 |
| CDR D. E. Boyles | 8 December 2005 | 1 May 2007 |
| CDR S. P. Malone | 1 May 2007 | 2 July 2008 |
| CDR J. P. Olive | 2 July 2008 | 27 August 2009 |
| CDR C. W. Michaels | 27 August 2009 | 12 November 2010 |
| CDR K. A. Strong | 12 November 2010 | 4 January 2012 |
| CDR B. C. Gaut | 4 January 2012 | 15 February 2013 |
| CDR Richard W. Whitfield | 15 February 2013 | 10 April 2014 |
| CDR Lonnie L. Appleget | 10 April 2014 | 4 July 2015 |
| CDR Kenneth P. Ward | 4 July 2015 | 4 October 2016 |
| CDR Robert G. Wickman | 4 October 2016 | 26 November 2017 |
| CDR Charles N. Mckissick | 26 November 2017 | 22 February 2019 |
| CDR Stephen D. Steacy | 22 February 2019 | 25 April 2020 |
| CDR Thomas J. Uhl | 25 April 2020 | 29 April 2021 |
| CDR Nicholas F. Cunningham | 29 April 2021 | 1 August 2022 |
| CDR Blade A. Schallenberger | 1 August 2022 | 7 September 2023 |
| CDR Sean T. Cavanagh | 7 September 2023 | 28 February 2025 |

=== Squadron aircraft ===
SH-60 Seahawk

- SH-60B, 1987–2009
- MH-60R, 2009 – present (redesignated HSM-77 on 2 April 2009)

=== Squadron awards ===
- 2001 – Battle "E"
- 2005 – Humanitarian Service Medal
- 2007 – Battle "E"
- 2008 – Battle "E"
- 2010 – Battle "E"
- 2011 – Battle "E"
- 2011 – COMPACFLT Retention Excellence Award
- 2011 – Blue "H" Award
- 2011 – Blue "M" Award
- 2011 – CNO Aviation Safety Award
- 2011 – COMHSMWINGPAC/Sikorsky "Golden Wrench" Maintenance Excellence Award
- 2011 – Captain Arnold Jay Isbell Trophy
- 2012 – Secretary of the Navy Safety Excellence Award
- 2012 – COMHSMWINGPAC/Sikorsky "Golden Wrench" Maintenance Excellence Award
- 2012 – Secretary of Defense Phoenix Award
- 2012 – Battle "E"
- 2012 – COMNAVAIRFOR Admiral J.S. "Jimmy" Thach Award
- 2014 – COMPACFLT Retention Excellence Award
- 2014 – Battle "E"
- 2015 – COMPACFLT Retention Excellence Award
- 2015 – Meritorious Unit Commendation
- 2015 – Humanitarian Service Medal
- 2018 – Secretary of the Navy Safety Excellence Award
- 2020 – COMHSMWINGPAC/Sikorsky "Golden Wrench" Maintenance Excellence Award
- 2020 - Battle "E"
- 2021 - Secretary of Defense Phoenix Award
- 2021 - Meritorious Unit Commendation

=== Ships deployed aboard ===
- USS Ronald Reagan (CVN-76)
- USS George Washington (CVN-73)
- USS Abraham Lincoln (CVN-72)
- USS Constellation (CV-64)
- RFA Fort Victoria (A387)
- USS Cape St. George (CG-71)
- USS Momsen (DDG-92)
- USS Sterett (DDG-104)
- USS Valley Forge (CG-50)
- USS Bunker Hill (CG-52)
- USS Princeton (CG-59)
- USS Shiloh (CG-67)
- USS Shoup (DDG-86)
- USS Antietam (CG-54)
- USS Chancellorsville (CG-62)
- USS Hewitt (DD-966)
- USS Ford (FFG-54)

=== Gallery ===
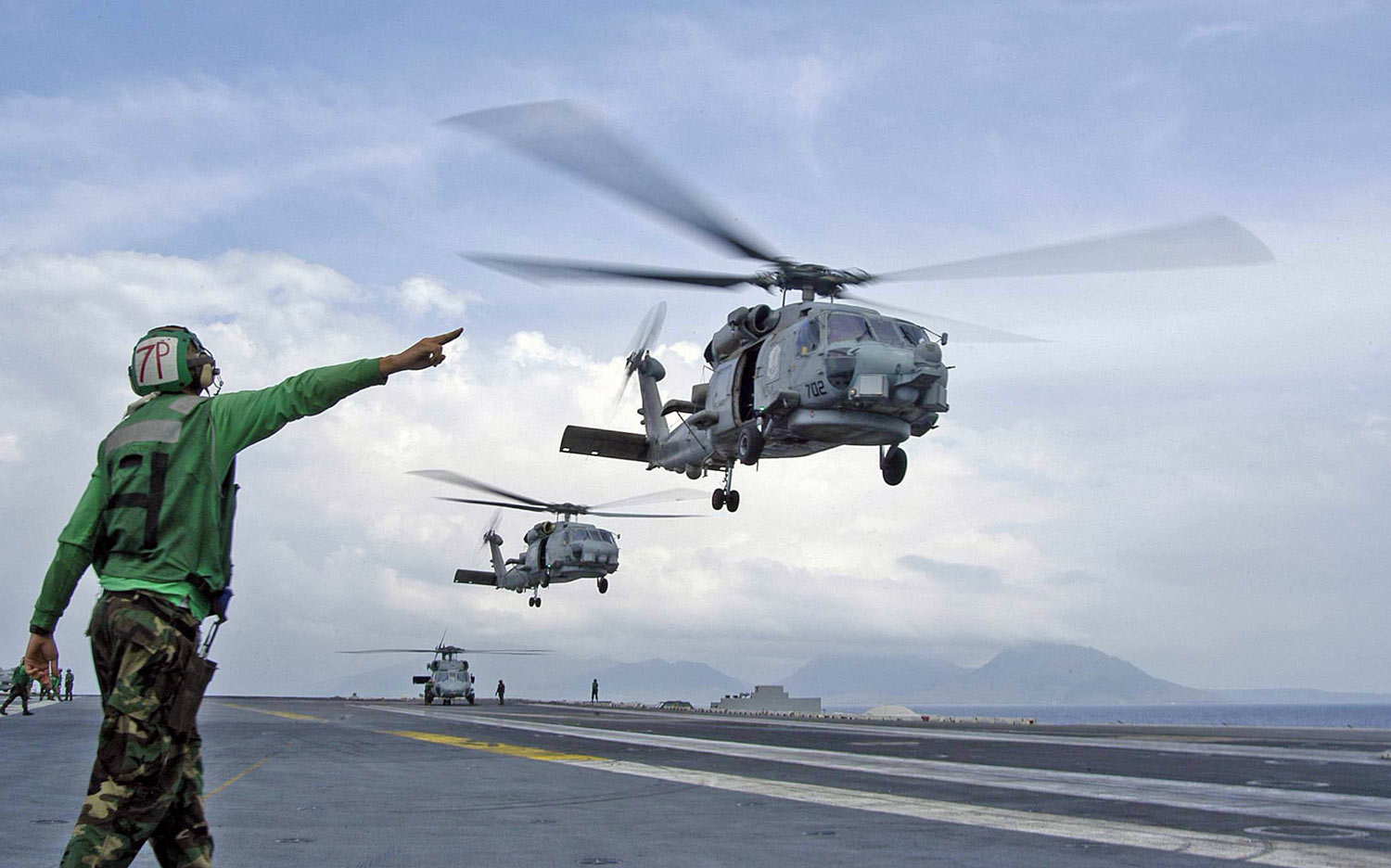
HSL-47 launches off USS Abraham Lincoln to provide disaster relief in Sumatra

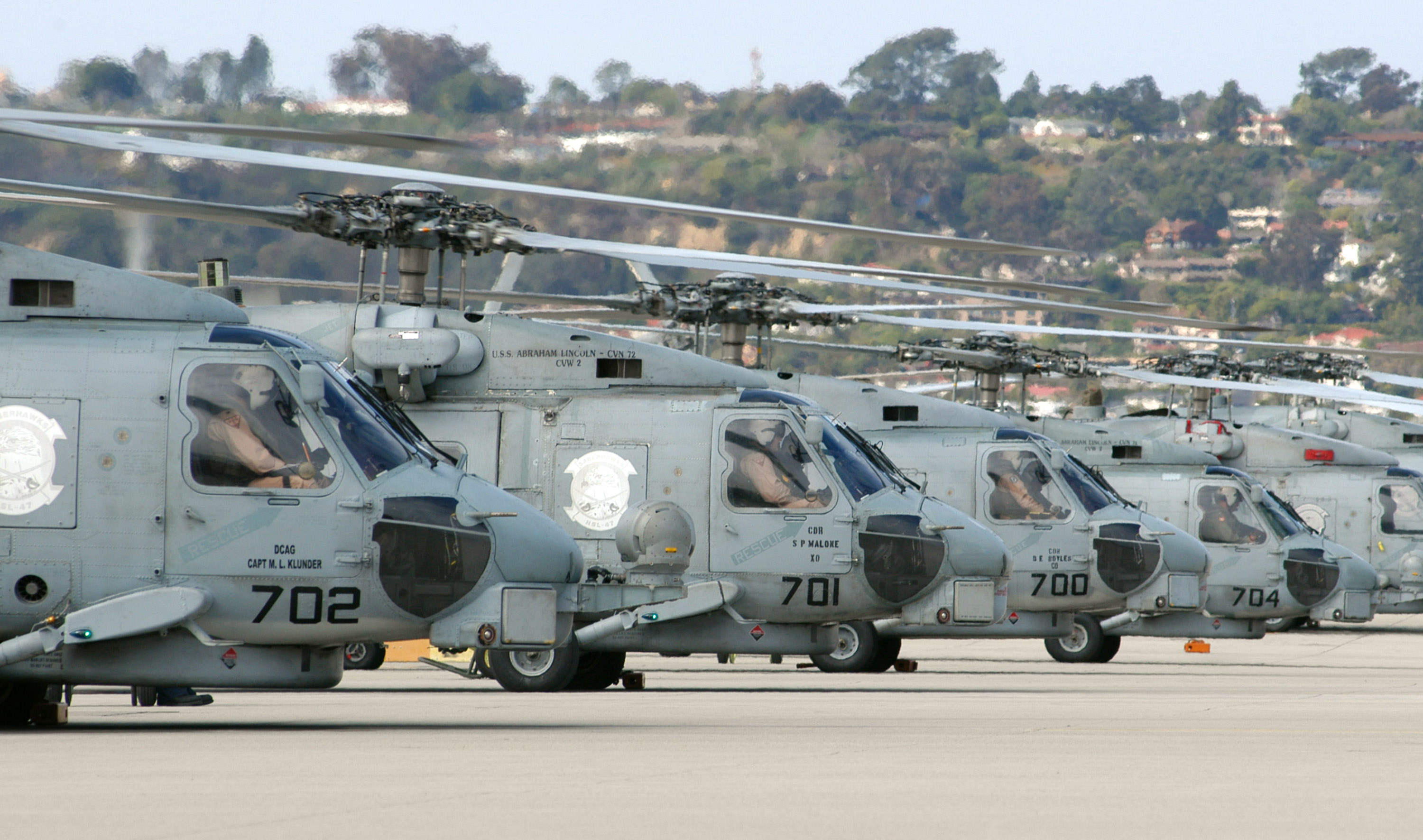
HSL-47 ready to flyoff from home to support Abraham Lincoln Strike Group operations

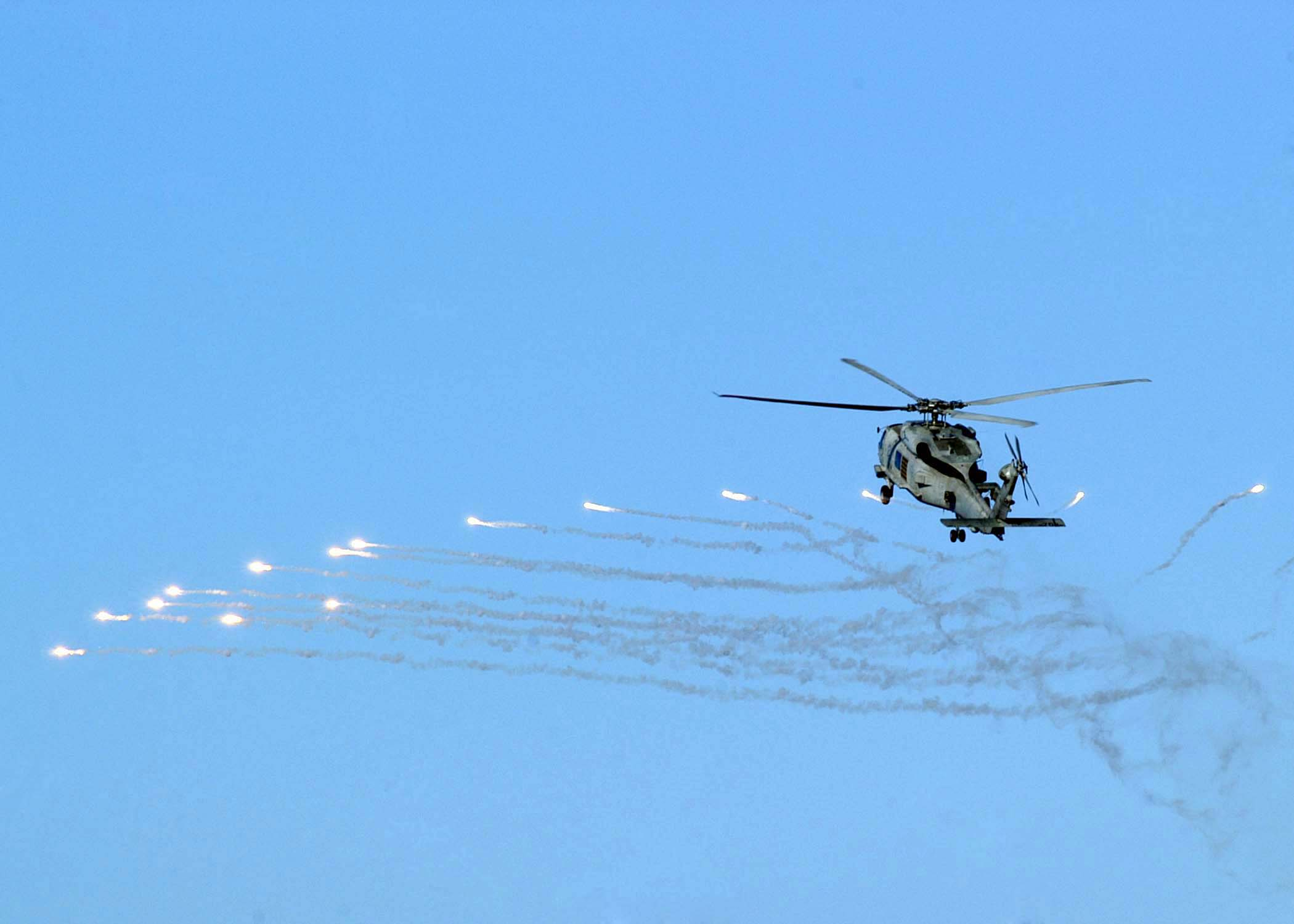
An SH-60B deploys its flares while evasively maneuvering

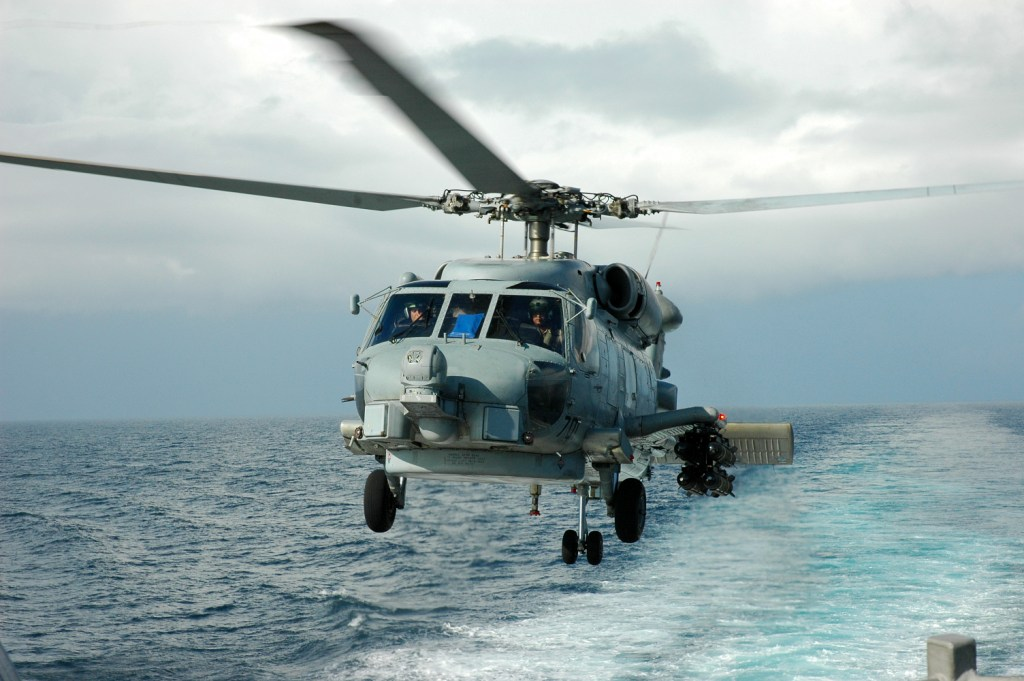
An SH-60B approaches the deck of the USS Curts for recovery following a mission supporting OIF

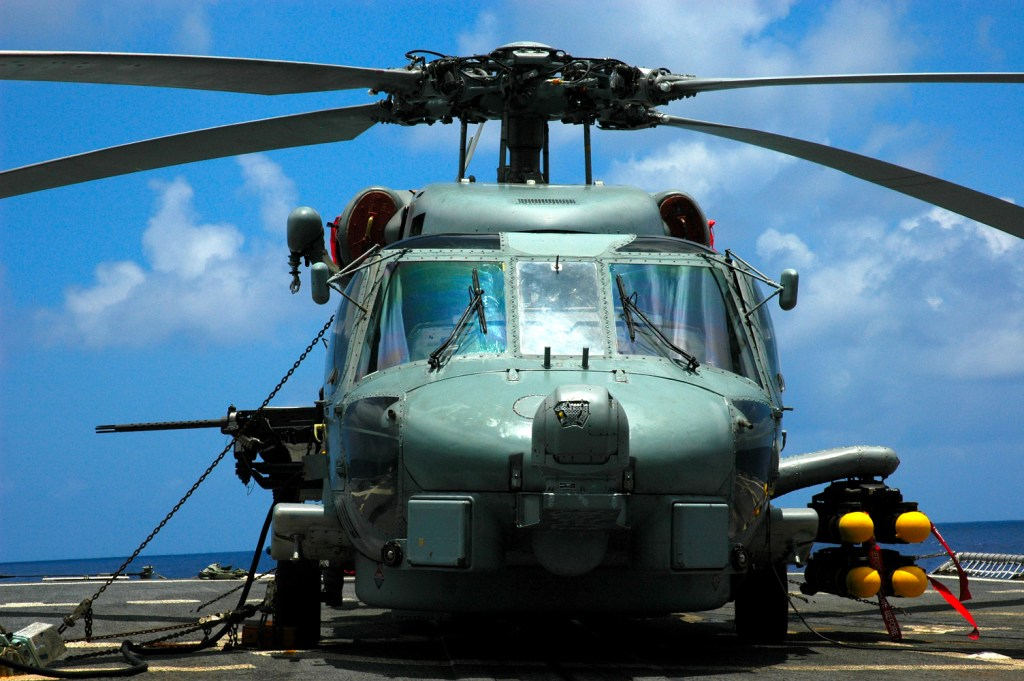
An SH-60B on alert strapped and ready to support OIF Operations on USS Curts

== See also ==
- History of the United States Navy
- List of United States Navy aircraft squadrons
- Carrier Air Wing Five
- Sikorsky SH-60 Seahawk
- USS Ronald Reagan (CVN-76)
