= Scott R. Van Buskirk =

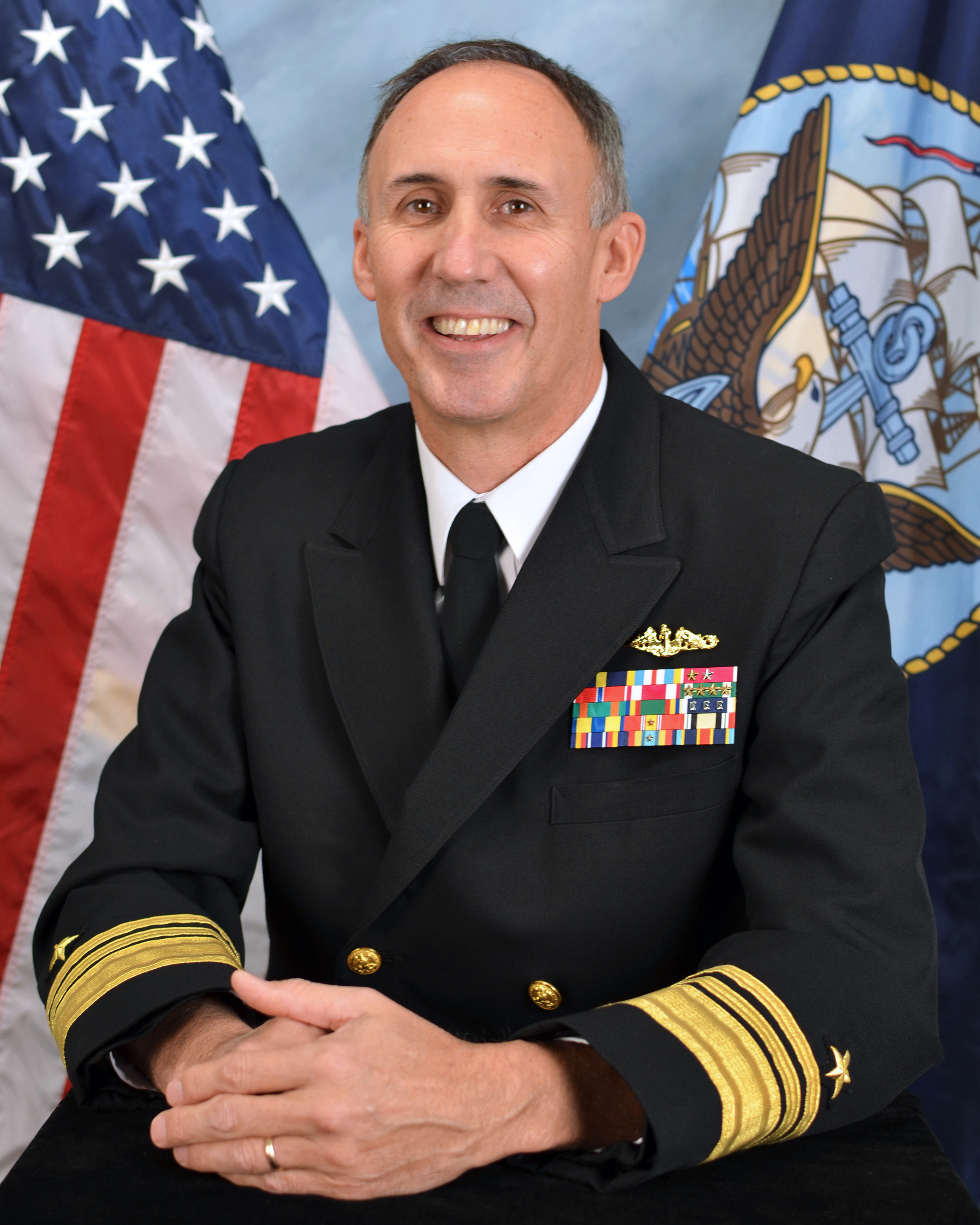
- Vice Admiral Scott Van Buskirk
- Born: November 30, 1959 (age 66); Petaluma, California
- Military career
- Allegiance: United States of America
- Branch: United States Navy
- Service years: 1979–2013
- Rank: Vice Admiral
- Commands: Chief of Naval Personnel; United States Seventh Fleet; Carrier Strike Group Nine; USS Pasadena
- Awards: Navy Distinguished Service Medal (2); Defense Superior Service Medal; Legion of Merit (7); Bronze Star; Meritorious Service Medal

Vice Admiral Scott Ray Van Buskirk, is a retired United States Navy officer who was the 56th Chief of Naval Personnel. He served as the CNP from October 2011 to August 2013. He was succeeded by Vice Admiral William F. Moran and retired after 34 years of service. He is one of only two submarine officers to have commanded a carrier strike group.

== Biography ==
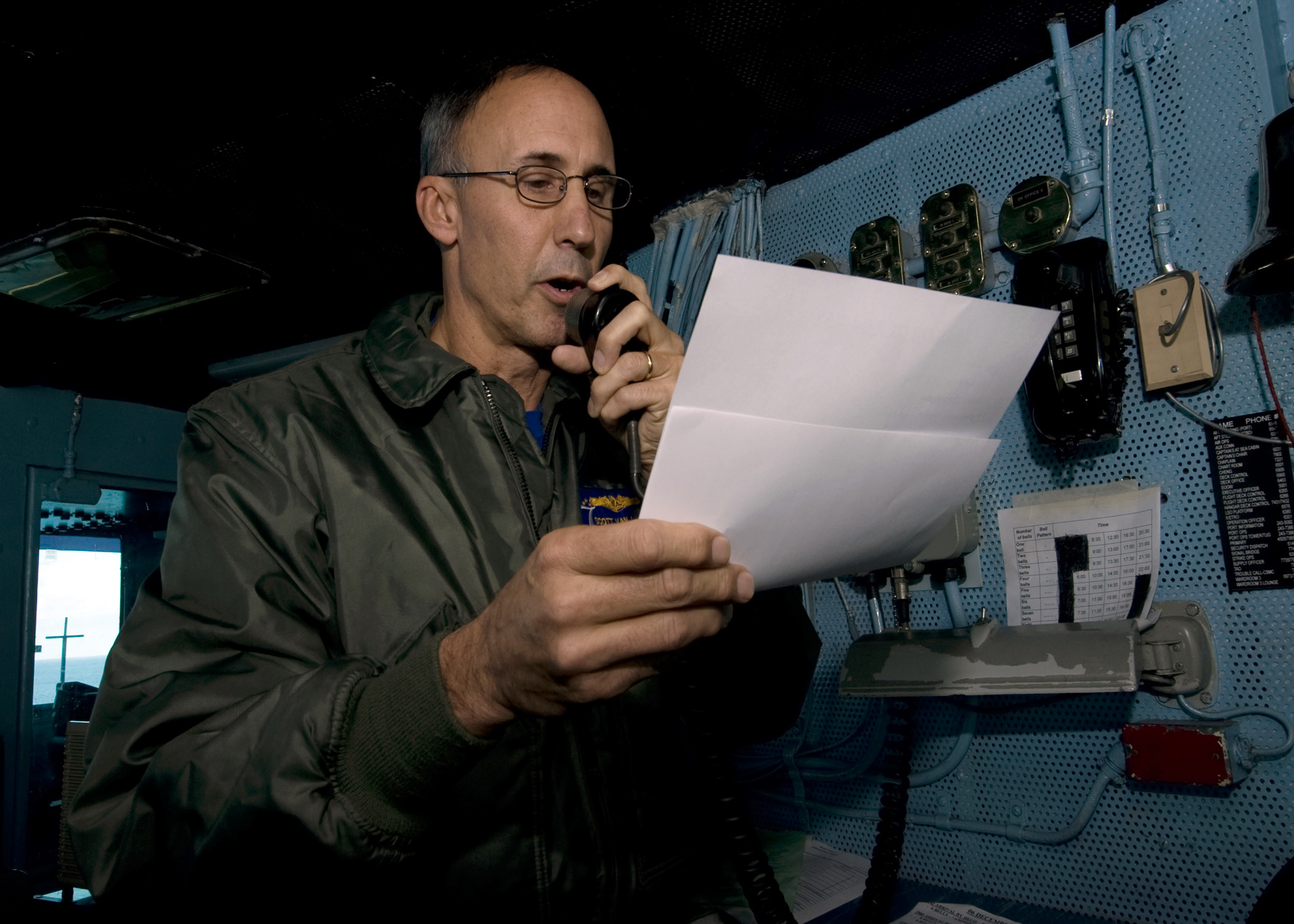
Vice Admiral Van Buskirk aboard USS George Washington.

A native of Petaluma, California, Van Buskirk graduated from the United States Naval Academy in 1979. He assumed duties as the Navy's 56th Chief of Naval Personnel on Oct. 11, 2011. His responsibilities include overseeing the United States Navy Recruiting Command, Navy Personnel Command, and Naval Education and Training Command.

Van Buskirk received a master's degree from the Naval Postgraduate School and served tours in the Navy Office of Legislative Affairs; Submarine Force U.S. Pacific Fleet; Bureau of Naval Personnel; and, Submarine Force U.S. Atlantic Fleet.

At sea, he served on board USS Seawolf (SSN-575), USS Salt Lake City (SSN-716), USS Tunny (SSN-682), and USS Georgia (SSBN-729) Gold Crew, and commanded the USS Pasadena (SSN-752) and Submarine Development Squadron 12. As a flag officer, he has served as commander, Task Force Total Force; deputy to the Deputy Chief of Staff, Strategic Effects (MNF-Iraq); commander, Carrier Strike Group Nine; assistant deputy, Chief of Naval Operations for Operations, Plans and Strategy (N3/N5B); deputy commander and chief of staff, U.S. Pacific Fleet.

Van Buskirk served as the 47th commander of the United States Seventh Fleet, forward deployed in Yokosuka, Japan, in 2010 and 2011. He commanded U.S. naval forces during Operation Tomodachi, providing assistance to Japan following the 2011 Tōhoku earthquake and tsunami.

== Awards and decorations ==
Submarine Warfare insignia (Officer)
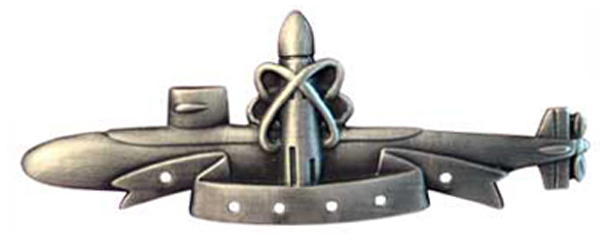
Silver SSBN Deterrent Patrol insignia (2 awards)

Navy Distinguished Service Medal (with one gold award star)
Defense Superior Service Medal
Legion of Merit (with one silver and one gold award stars)
Bronze Star
Meritorious Service Medal
Navy Commendation Medal (with four gold award stars)
Navy Achievement Medal
Navy Unit Commendation
Navy "E" Ribbon (with three E devices)
Navy Expeditionary Medal
National Defense Service Medal (with one bronze service star)
Iraq Campaign Medal
Global War on Terrorism Service Medal
Sea Service Deployment Ribbon (with one silver service star)
Navy & Marine Corps Overseas Service Ribbon
Order of National Security Merit, Gukseon Medal (Republic of Korea)
Order of the Rising Sun (Japan, 2nd class, Kyokujitsu-Jukousho (旭日重光章))
