= William Douglas Crowder =

United States Navy admiral

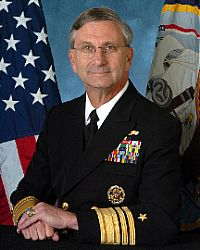
- Vice Admiral William Crowder
- Born: 1952 (age 73–74)
- Military career
- Allegiance: United States Navy
- Service years: 1974-2009
- Rank: Vice admiral
- Commands: US 7th Fleet; Carrier Strike Group Nine; USS Kidd (DDG-993)
- Awards: Navy Distinguished Service Medal; Legion of Merit

Vice Admiral William Douglas Crowder (born 1952) is a retired United States Navy admiral who served as Deputy Chief of Naval Operations for Operations, Plans and Strategy (N3/N5) in his final assignment, retiring in November 2009. Crowder was the 45th commander of the United States 7th Fleet from September 2006 to July 2008.

== Career ==
The son of a navy master chief and quartermaster, Crowder received a congressional appointment to the United States Naval Academy, where he graduated in June 1974.

At sea, Crowder has served in numerous ships in both Pacific and Atlantic Fleets including: as CIC officer in USS Ramsey (FFG-2), aft propulsion group officer in USS Kitty Hawk (CV-63), combat systems officer in USS Stump (DD-978), and executive officer in USS Yorktown (CG-48).

He commanded USS Kidd (DDG-993) from 1992–1994, operating in both the Pacific and Atlantic, winning the Battle Efficiency "E" Award. In 1998-1999 he commanded Destroyer Squadron 24, deploying to the Mediterranean as part of the USS John F. Kennedy Battle Group. He also served as the aide and flag lieutenant to Commander, Naval Surface Force Atlantic.

Ashore, Crowder has served a number of tours in the Pentagon including: as action officer on the staff of the Chief of Naval Operations, Strategy and Plans Division (OP-60); Surface Warfare Analyst in the Office of Program Appraisal (Office of Secretary of the Navy); Deputy Executive Assistant to the Vice Chief of Naval Operations; Chief of the Planning and Integration Branch, Joint Staff (J-8); Senior Staff of the National Defense Panel; and as Executive Assistant to the Vice Chief of Naval Operations. He also served as Executive Assistant and Senior Naval Aide to the Commander-in-Chief U.S. Pacific Fleet.

Crowder commanded the U.S. 7th Fleet from September 2006 to July 2008. Prior to assuming that command, he was ADCNO for Information, Plans, and Strategy (OPNAV N3/N5B) in August 2005. His previous Flag assignments were as director of Deep Blue, the Navy Operations Group, from August 2002 to May 2004, director of Operations, Plans and Political Military Affairs Division (N31/N52) from September 2001-October 2002 — both on the staff of the Chief of Naval Operations. Additionally he served as commander of Carrier Strike Group Nine/Abraham Lincoln Strike Group from July 2004 to August 2005 deploying to the western Pacific and serving as commander of Combined Support Group Indonesia, as part of Operation Unified Assistance (Tsunami Relief effort).

== Awards and honors ==
Navy Surface Warfare Officer Pin
Office of the Joint Chiefs of Staff Identification Badge

Navy Distinguished Service Medal
Defense Superior Service Medal with one bronze oak leaf cluster
Legion of Merit with four gold award stars
Defense Meritorious Service Medal
Meritorious Service Medal with four award stars
Navy Commendation Medal
Joint Meritorious Unit Award with two oak leaf clusters
Navy Meritorious Unit Commendation
Navy "E" Ribbon with three Battle E awards
Navy Expeditionary Medal
National Defense Service Medal with two bronze service stars
Armed Forces Expeditionary Medal
Global War on Terrorism Expeditionary Medal
Global War on Terrorism Service Medal
Humanitarian Service Medal with service star
Navy Sea Service Deployment Ribbon with one silver and two bronze service stars
Navy & Marine Corps Overseas Service Ribbon with three service stars
Order of the Rising Sun, Gold and Silver Star, 2008 (Japan)
Inter-American Defense Board Medal
Navy Expert Pistol Shot Medal

Vice Admiral Crowder was selected as an Olmsted Scholar and studied European Economic and Political Affairs at the University of Lausanne, Switzerland from 1980-82. In November 1982, he was awarded the Jean Monnet Medal for Leadership by the President of the French Senate in Paris.
