= USS Shoup =

United States Navy Arleigh Burke-class destroyer

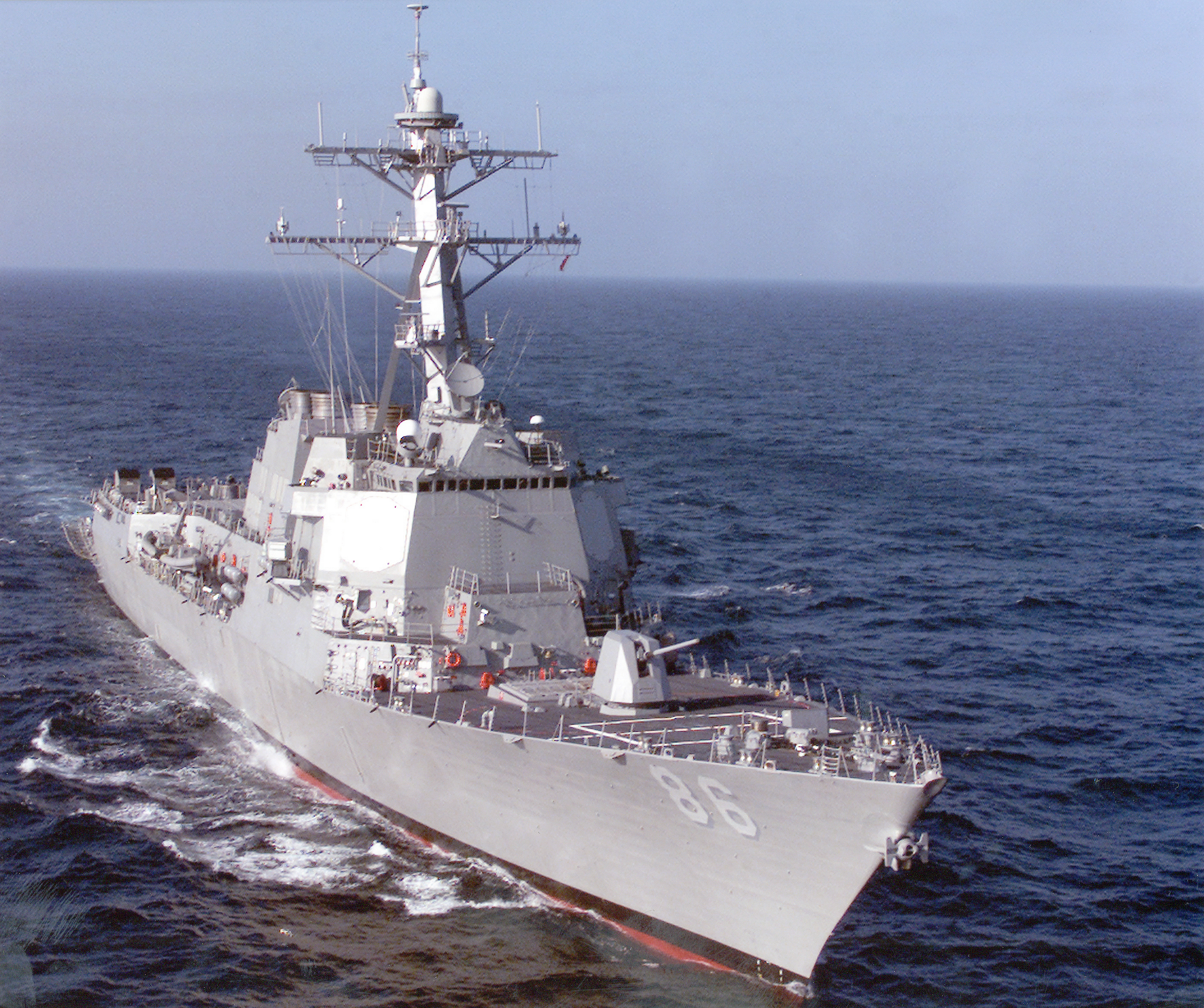
- USS Shoup in the Gulf of Mexico in 2001

History

United States
- Name: Shoup
- Namesake: David M. Shoup
- Awarded: 13 December 1996
- Builder: Ingalls Shipbuilding
- Laid down: 13 December 1999
- Launched: 22 November 2000
- Commissioned: 22 June 2002
- Home port: Yokosuka, Japan
- Identification: MMSI number: 368006000; Callsign: NSHP; Hull number: DDG-86
- Motto: Victoria Per Perseverantiam Venit; (Through Perseverance Comes Victory)
- Status: in active service
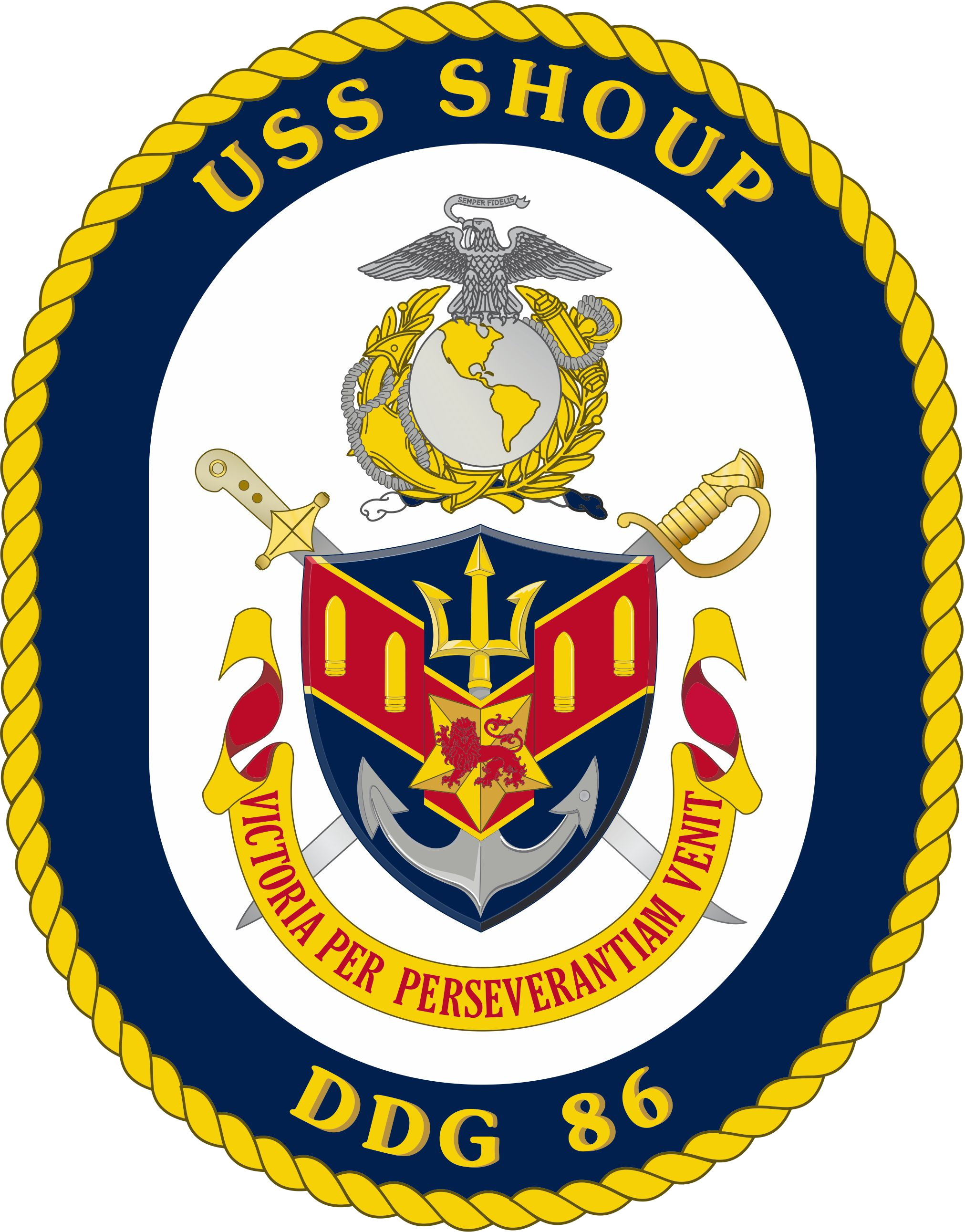
- Badge

General characteristics
- Class & type: Arleigh Burke-class destroyer
- Displacement: 9,200 tons
- Length: 509 ft 6 in (155.30 m)
- Beam: 66 ft (20 m)
- Draft: 31 ft (9.4 m)
- Propulsion: 4 × General Electric LM2500-30 gas turbines, 2 shafts, 100,000 shp (75,000 kW)
- Speed: exceeds 30 knots (56 km/h; 35 mph)
- Complement: 310 officers and enlisted
- Armament: Guns: 1 × 5-inch (127 mm)/62 Mk 45 Mod 4 (lightweight gun); 1 × 20 mm (0.8 in) Phalanx CIWS; 2 × 25 mm (0.98 in) Mk 38 machine gun system; 4 × 0.50 in (12.7 mm) caliber guns; Missiles: 1 × 32-cell, 1 × 64-cell (96 total cells) Mk 41 vertical launching system (VLS): RIM-66M surface-to-air missile; RIM-156 surface-to-air missile; RIM-174A Standard ERAM; RIM-161 anti-ballistic missile; RIM-162 ESSM (quad-packed); BGM-109 Tomahawk cruise missile; RUM-139 vertical launch ASROC; Torpedoes: 2 × Mark 32 triple torpedo tubes: Mark 46 lightweight torpedo; Mark 50 lightweight torpedo; Mark 54 lightweight torpedo
- Aircraft carried: 2 × MH-60R Seahawk helicopters

USS Shoup (DDG-86) is an Arleigh Burke-class (Flight IIA) Aegis guided missile destroyer in the United States Navy. The ship is named for Medal of Honor recipient General David M. Shoup, the 22nd Commandant of the Marine Corps.

Construction began at the Northrop Grumman Ship Systems' Ingalls Operations on 10 November 1998. Shoup was the 16th ship of this class to be built at Ingalls Shipbuilding. Her keel was laid on 13 December 1999 and she was launched on 22 November 2000. Shoup sailed into the Gulf of Mexico for the first of her sea trials on 11 December 2001. The vessel was delivered to the Navy by Northrop Grumman on 18 February 2002 and departed Pascagoula, Mississippi on 22 April 2002. Shoup was commissioned on 22 June 2002 at Port Terminal 37 in Seattle, Washington.

== Service history ==
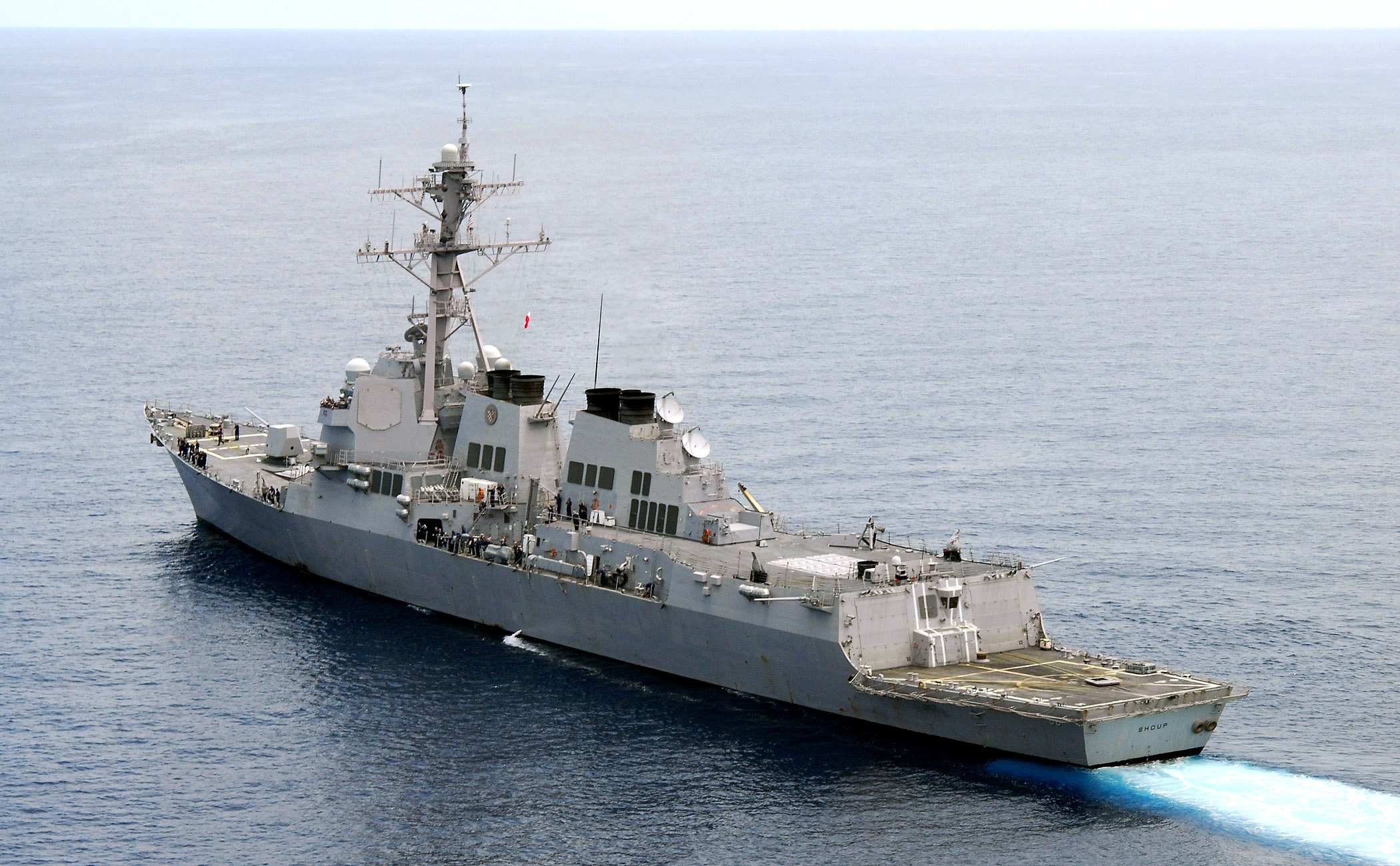
Shoup in the South China Sea, April 2006

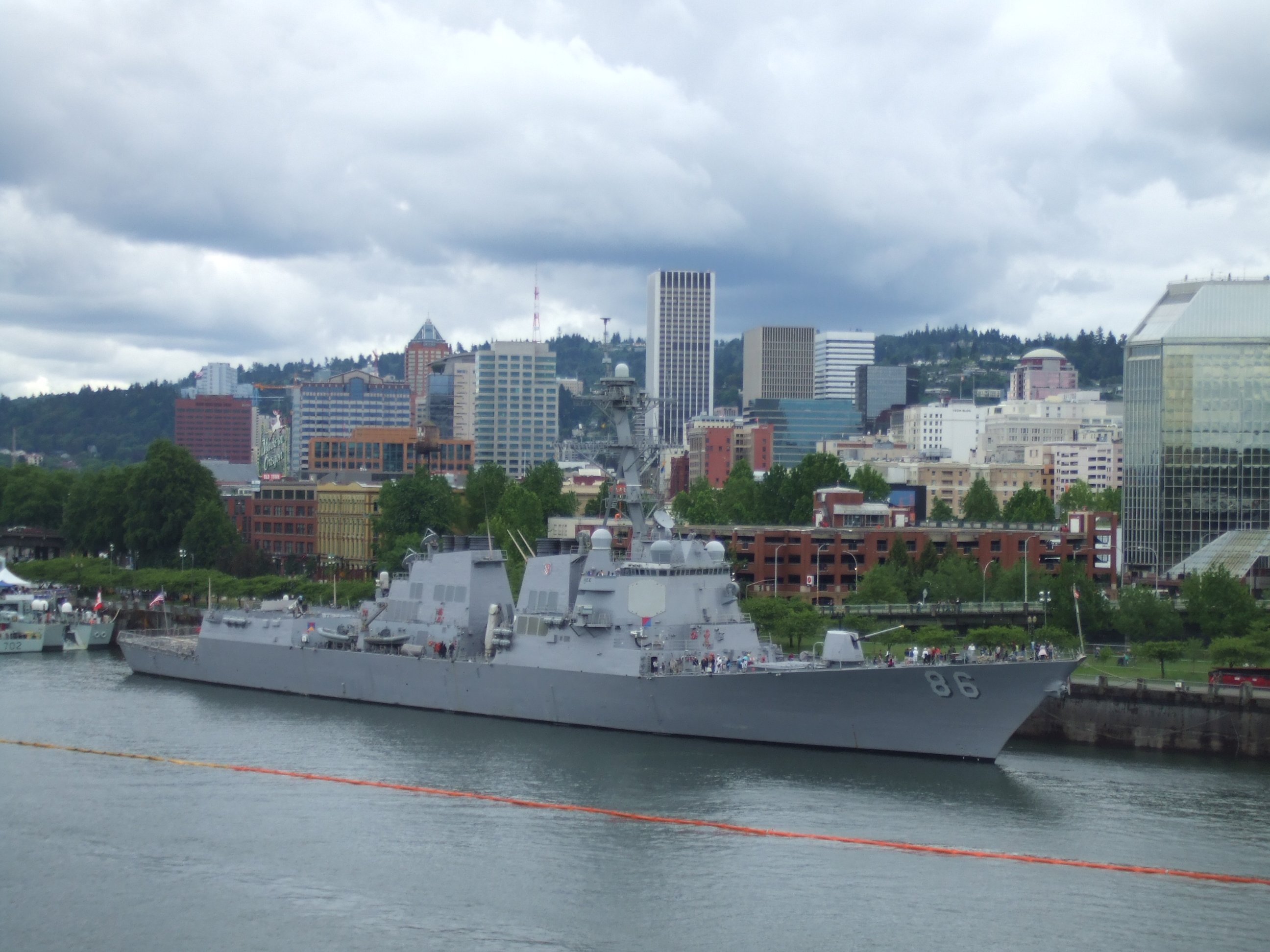
Shoup in Portland, Oregon for the Rose Festival Fleet Week, June 2009

=== 2000s ===
In July 2002, she successfully conducted the US Navy's operational evaluation of the RIM-162 Evolved Sea Sparrow Missile with two test firings.

In January 2005, she participated in Operation Unified Assistance.

On 9 May 2008, while operating with Combined Task Force 150, Shoup assisted a disabled dhow named Dunia by towing the vessel from the Gulf of Aden to Mukalla, Yemen.

=== 2010s ===
On 1 August 2010 the ship collided with a civilian vessel off Oceanside, California. The hull of the 21-foot (6.4 m) civilian boat was cracked, but no injuries were reported. Shoup was not damaged.

Shoup provided assistance to South Korean naval forces after their recapture of the chemical tanker Samho Jewelry on 21 January 2011 in the Arabian Sea. The tanker's captain had been shot by pirates holding the vessel and a helicopter from Shoup was used to evacuate him in order for him to receive medical treatment for his injuries.

During her 2013 deployment to the Persian Gulf and Red Sea, Shoup participated in numerous multinational exercises while providing theater security and support of ongoing maritime stability in the region. Shoup returned to homeport on 18 November 2013 following several extensions during what was the longest deployment for a US Navy destroyer since World War II at 313 days.

In 2017 Shoup deployed to the Persian Gulf and Arabian Sea as a member of the USS Nimitz Carrier Strike Group, making port visits to India, Bahrain and Oman. Also, she participated in Tri carrier operations in the Sea of Japan in support of a visit by the U.S. President in the region.

On 25 July 2018, Shoup participated in Valiant Shield 2018 and Oceanic Maritime Security Operations in the South Pacific, and made port visits to Guam, Fiji and American Samoa.

== Coat of arms ==
=== Shield ===
The shield has background of blue with a red chevron center. Featured in the chevron are artillery shells and a reversed gold start with a lion center. A large combined anchor with a trident center cover the shield.

The traditional Navy colors were chosen for the shield because dark blue and gold represents the sea and excellence respectively. The combined trident and anchor, symbols of sea prowess, represent our naval history and the evolvement of modern warfare systems. The tridents three tines denote the warfare areas: air, surface, and undersea warfare. The red chevron with artillery shells represents valor and sacrifice, suggesting the troops led by Colonel Shoup crossing the reefs of Betio and bombardment of enemy fire. The red lion exemplifies courage and strength symbolizing Colonel Shoup's British Distinguished Service Order award for the battle at Betio. The reversed gold star refers to Colonel Shoup's Medal of Honor awarded for his heroism as commander of the Second Marine Division at Betio and the disputed island of Tarawa Atoll.

=== Crest ===
The crest consists of the Marine Corps emblem surrounded by laurels.

The Marine Corps emblem reflects Commandant Shoup's World War II service and career as Commandant of the Marine Corps highlighting leadership and guidance. The surrounding laurels characterize achievement and honor.

=== Motto ===
The motto is written on a scroll of gold that has a red reverse side.

The ships motto is "Victoria per Perseverantiam Venit" or "Through Perseverance Comes Victory". The motto is a reference to both the honorable feats of Colonel Shoup and the Medal of Honor he received.

=== Seal ===
The coat of arms in full color as in the blazon, upon a white background enclosed within a dark blue oval border edged on the outside with a gold rope and bearing the inscription "USS Shoup" at the top and "DDG 86" in the base all gold.
