= Samuel Pérez =

Samuel Pérez may refer to:

- Samuel Pérez Álvarez (born 1992), Guatemalan politician, president of Congress (since 2024)
- Samuel Pérez (pianist) (born 1952), Puerto Rican pianist
- Samuel Perez Jr. (born 1958), American admiral
- Samu Pérez or Samuel Pérez Fariña (born 1997), Spanish footballer
