= Destroyer Squadron 1 =

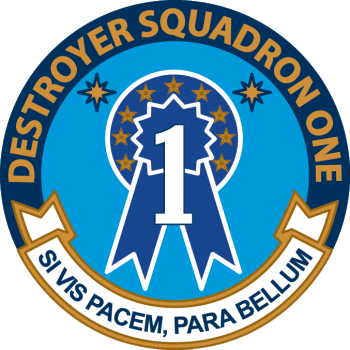
- Current Destroyer Squadron 1 insignia
- Active: 1941-present
- Country: United States
- Branch: United States Navy
- Type: Destroyer Squadron
- Role: Operational Commander Support
- Part of: Carrier Strike Group One
- Garrison/HQ: San Diego Naval Base
- Nickname: "Total Force"
- Mottos: Si Vis Pacem, Para Bellum "If you want peace, Prepare for War"
- Engagements: World War II; Korean War; Operation Enduring Freedom; Operation Iraqi Freedom; Operation Enduring Freedom - Afghanistan; Operation New Dawn
- Website: www.surfpac.navy.mil/desron1/

Commanders
- Commodore: CAPT Craig Trent
- Deputy Commodore: CAPT Thomas "Pete" Abbott
- Command Master Chief: CMDCM (SW/AW) Jeromy Hartley

Destroyer Squadron ONE, also known as Destroyer Squadron 1 and often abbreviated at DESRON ONE or DESRON 1, is a squadron of warships of the United States Navy. It is an operational component of Carrier Strike Group One and is administratively responsible to Commander, Naval Surface Forces Pacific.

The Squadron's combat mission is to support the Operational Commander (currently Carrier Strike Group One) in achieving optimum combat readiness for his ships and to ensure adherence to Type Commander requirements. As such, Commander, Destroyer Squadron One (COMDESRON-1) conducts continuous, extensive liaison and coordination with the assigned Operational Commander. In addition to operations in the U.S. Third Fleet, the squadron's ships have deployed to the Persian Gulf as part of the U.S. Fifth Fleet, to the Western Pacific as part of the U.S. Seventh Fleet, and regularly support Joint Task Force North counter-drug operations in South America and the Caribbean Sea, as well as other fleet commitments.

== Composition ==
The current composition of the squadron includes:

- Squadron Headquarters, at Naval Base San Diego
- USS Hopper (DDG-70)
- USS Kidd (DDG-100)
- USS Sterett (DDG-104)
- USS William P. Lawrence (DDG-110)
- USS Chafee (DDG-90)

== Mission ==
The Commander, Destroyer Squadron ONE is to direct, oversee and assist the ships of the squadron in achieving and maintaining the highest level of material, operational and personnel readiness. When required, he shall exercise command over ships assigned for naval operations in order to achieve sea and air control in pursuit of national objectives. Function as Immediate Superior in Command (ISIC), for assigned ships and prepare them for sustained combat operations at sea. Prepare ships for assignment to operational commanders as directed by Commander, Naval Surface Forces Pacific Fleet and Commander Third Fleet. Maintain ISIC responsibilities throughout the life cycle of the ship, regardless of location or operational control, except in circumstances where otherwise directed. Provide administrative and material support that will include, but not be limited to: personnel support, OMBUDSMAN program support, ship's restricted availability (SRA), Refueling and Overhaul (ROH) and other maintenance availability planning and administrative assistance.

== Operational history ==
Destroyer Squadron One was initially listed in the U.S. Navy's order of battle in the Navy Directories of 1919, but disappeared from the Naval Register in 1927. In 1937, Destroyer Squadron Twenty (DESRON-20) was re-designated as Destroyer Squadron One.

=== World War Two ===
Destroyer Squadron One was present during the Attack on Pearl Harbor on 7 December 1941. DESRON-1 destroyers served as part of Task Force 11 in the aborted relief efforts for Wake Island and Rabaul, as well as seeing action during the Battle of Coral Sea. DESRON-1 destroyers subsequently saw further action during the Battle of Midway and the Battle of the Eastern Solomons as part of Task Force 16. DESRON-1 destroyers subsequently provided shore bombardment as Fire-Support Group Love and anti-submarine/anti-aircraft support as Air Support Group 1 to the initial phase of the Guadalcanal campaign, and Destroyer Squadron One saw action during the Battle of the Komandorski Islands, the invasion of Attu, and the invasion of Kiska during the Aleutian Islands campaign. In September 1943, the squadron returned to the West Coast for overhaul.

With Guadalcanal and the Aleutians secured, the U.S. Navy began its Central Pacific offensive with the Gilbert and Marshall Islands campaign undertaken between November 1943 and February 1944. DESRON-1 destroyers Farragut, Monaghan, and Aylwin screened the escort carrier task group during the invasion of Tarawa while Dewey and Hull screened the shore bombardment task group during the assault on Makin Island. Phelps and Macdonough served as control ships for the assault craft. Subsequently, DESRON-1 destroyers Farragut, Dale, and Monaghan screened the escort carrier force while Macdonough and Aylwin escorted the amphibious transport force during the landings on Kwajalein. Also, Dewey and Hull provided support to the amphibious reserve force, and Phelps supported mine-sweeping operations and Marine landings on Roi-Namur. Macdonough, Monaghan, and Aylwin provided shore bombardment support to the amphibious landings on Parry Island.

Following the conclusion of the Gilbert and Marshall campaign, DESRON-1 destroyers screened Task Group 58.1 during carrier air strikes against Palau, Yap, Ulithi, Woleai, Truk, Satawan, and Ponape. DESRON-1 destroyers also provided naval gunfire support to the Hollandia invasion which initiated the Western New Guinea campaign.

The next objective of the Central Pacific offensive was the Mariana Islands campaign that occurred between June and November 1944. DESRON-1 destroyers screened Task Group 58.1 during this operation, while also carrying out individual ship assignments during the invasion. Dewey, Hull, and Macdonough supported minesweeping and underwater demolition pre-invasion operations at Saipan while Farragut, Dale, Monaghan, and Aylwin carried out patrol and shore bombardment duties. Later, Task Group 58.1 and Destroyer Squadron One saw combat action during the Battle of the Philippine Sea.

In December 1944, while operating in support the Philippines Campaign, Task Force 38 was hit by a powerful typhoon, and DESRON-1 destroyers Monaghan and Hull were lost. In February 1945, DESRON-1 destroyers Dewey, Farragut, Dale, and Aylwin screened the fleet logistic force supporting the invasion of Iwo Jima. On 1 March 1945, Destroyer Squadron One was re-designated as Destroyer Division 10 of Destroyer Squadron 5, and in this capacity, it participated in the invasion of Okinawa in April.

DESRON 1's original nine destroyers earned a combined total 103 service stars during the Asiatic-Pacific campaign, with 97 while attached to Destroyer Squadron 1.

=== Cold War ===
Destroyer Squadron One subsequently participated in the Korean War and the Taiwan Strait Patrols. Destroyer Squadron One was re-designated as Reserve Destroyer Squadron 27 (ResDesRon 27), established on January 13, 1958, which was subsequently re-designated Destroyer Squadron 27 (DesRon 27) in October 1970 and Surface Squadron 1 (SS-1) in March 1980 before being returned to its original designation of Destroyer Squadron One in October 1993.

=== Recent operations ===
Commander, Destroyer Squadron One (COMDESRON 1) was assigned as the Task Group Commander of the Cooperation Afloat Readiness and Training (CARAT) WESTPAC deployments to Southeast Asia from 2002 to 2007. CARAT is a rolling series of bilateral exercises conducted with the navies of the Republic of the Philippines, Indonesia, Brunei, Thailand, Malaysia, and Singapore. The primary mission of these deployments is to enhance cooperative engagement and naval interoperability with the participating Southeast Asian countries.

On 10 January 2011, two DESRON-1 guided-missile destroyers, Stockdale and Gridley, and their embarked detachments from Helicopter Anti-Submarine Squadron Light 49 (HSL-49) participated in a Passing Exercise (PASSEX) with the JMSDF helicopter destroyer Kurama in the Sea of Japan. Later in the same day, Stockdale and Gridley participated in separate PASSEX maneuvers with units of the Republic of Korea Navy. On 23 April 2011, the news media reported that the squadron's commodore, Captain Donald Hornbeck, was relieved of command by Carl Vinson strike group commander Rear Admiral Samuel Perez during an investigation into a possible improper relationship. At the time, the squadron was on a deployment to the Arabian Sea.

== DESRON ONE Commodores ==
World War Two

• Captain A. R. Early, USN	(13 November 1941 – 14 September 1942)
• Captain S. B. Brewer, USN	(14 September 1942 – 28 March 1943)
• Captain Ruthven E. Libby, USN	(28 March 1943 – 8 December 1943)
• Captain Ephriam R. McLean, Jr., USN	(8 December 1943 – 8 August 1944)
• Captain Preston V. Mercer, USN	(14 August 1944 – 30 January 1945)
• Captain J. F. Walsh, USN (acting)	(30 January 1945 – 1 March 1945)
• Captain Howard A. Yeager, USN	(1 February 1950 – 1 July 1951)

Destroyer/Surface Squadron One

• Captain Richard V. Dalton, USN	(23 May 1979 – 11 September 1982)
• Captain John D. Chamberlain, USN	(11 September 1982 – 12 May 1984)
• Captain Howard Venezia, USN	(12 May 1984 – 26 October 1986)
• Captain Paul V. Murphy, USN	(26 October 1986 – 20 August 1988)
• Captain Harry E. Bailey, USNR	(20 August 1988 – 18 August 1990)
• Captain Robert A. Goff, USNR	(11 August 1990 – 18 July 1992)
• Captain Thomas E. Plichta, USNR	(18 July 1992 – 12 February 1994)
• Captain Bruce Bradshaw, USNR	(12 February 1994 – 11 March 1996)
• Captain James M. Morrell, USNR	(11 March 1996 – 6 February 1998)
• Captain Barry L. Morgan, USNR	(6 February 1998 – 21 January 2000)
• Captain Gary M. Erickson, USNR	(21 January 2000 – 14 January 2002)
• Captain Terry A. Bragg, USNR	(14 January 2002 – 26 March 2004)
• Captain Lothrop S. Little, USNR	(26 March 2004 – 10 January 2006)
• Captain Alfred Collins, Sr., USN	(10 January 2006 – 13 August 2007)
• Captain Michael W. Selby, USN	(13 August 2007 – 19 June 2009)
• Captain Eric C. Young, USNR	(19 June 2009 – 23 November 2010)
• Captain Donald G. Hornbeck, USN	(23 November 2010 – 29 May 2011)
• Captain John Steinberger, USN	(29 May 2011 – 12 October 2012)
• Captain Michael Elliott, USN	(12 October 2012 – 21 February 2014)
• Captain Doug Stuffle, USNR	(21 February 2014 – 12 June 2015)
• Captain Joseph M. Keenan, USN	(12 June 2015 – 1 August 2016)
• Captain Nick A. Sarap, USN	(1 August 2016 – 25 October 2017)
• Captain Warren E. Cupps, USN	(25 October 2017 – 12 February 2019)
• Captain Randy J. Van Rossum, USN	(12 February 2019 – 30 June 2020)
• Captain Frankie "Jay" Clark, USN	(30 June 2020 – 15 July 2021)
• Captain Gil E. Clark, USN	(15 July 2021 – 5 August 2022)
• Captain Thomas G. Chekouras, USN	(5 August 2022 – 8 January 2024)
• Captain Craig M. Trent, USN	(8 January 2024 – Present)

== See also ==
- History of the United States Navy

== Sources ==
- Roscoe, Theodore (1953). United States Destroyer Operations in World War II. Annapolis, Maryland: United States Naval Institute. ISBN 0-87021-726-7.
