= VAW-125 =

Airborne Command & Control Squadron One Two Five
- Active: 1 October 1968 – Present
- Country: United States of America
- Branch: United States Navy
- Type: Airborne Early Warning
- Part of: Carrier Air Wing Five
- Garrison/HQ: Marine Corps Air Station Iwakuni
- Nicknames: "TigerTails" "Torch Bearers"
- Engagements: Gulf of Sidra incident (1981); Operation Thunderbolt; Action in the Gulf of Sidra (1986); Gulf War; Operation Joint Endeavor; Operation Southern Watch; Operation Enduring Freedom; Iraq War; Operation Epic Fury

Commanders
- Commanding Officer: CDR Kai "Wise Kai" Siegele
- Executive Officer: CDR Daniel Yates

Aircraft flown
- Electronic warfare: E-2 Hawkeye

Airborne Command & Control Squadron 125 (VAW-125), known as the "Torch Bearers" or "Tigertails", was established on 1 October 1968, at Naval Air Station Norfolk. The squadron's initial supporting command was Carrier Air Wing Three (CVW-3) deploying aboard USS Saratoga.

The squadron is equipped with the E-2 Hawkeye. It was the first east coast squadron with E-2B's in 1968, among the first to operate the E-2C in 1975, receiving the E-2C 2000 in its first operational year in 2003, and the first unit to operate the E-2D Advanced Hawkeye in 2014.

== Squadron History ==
=== 1970s ===
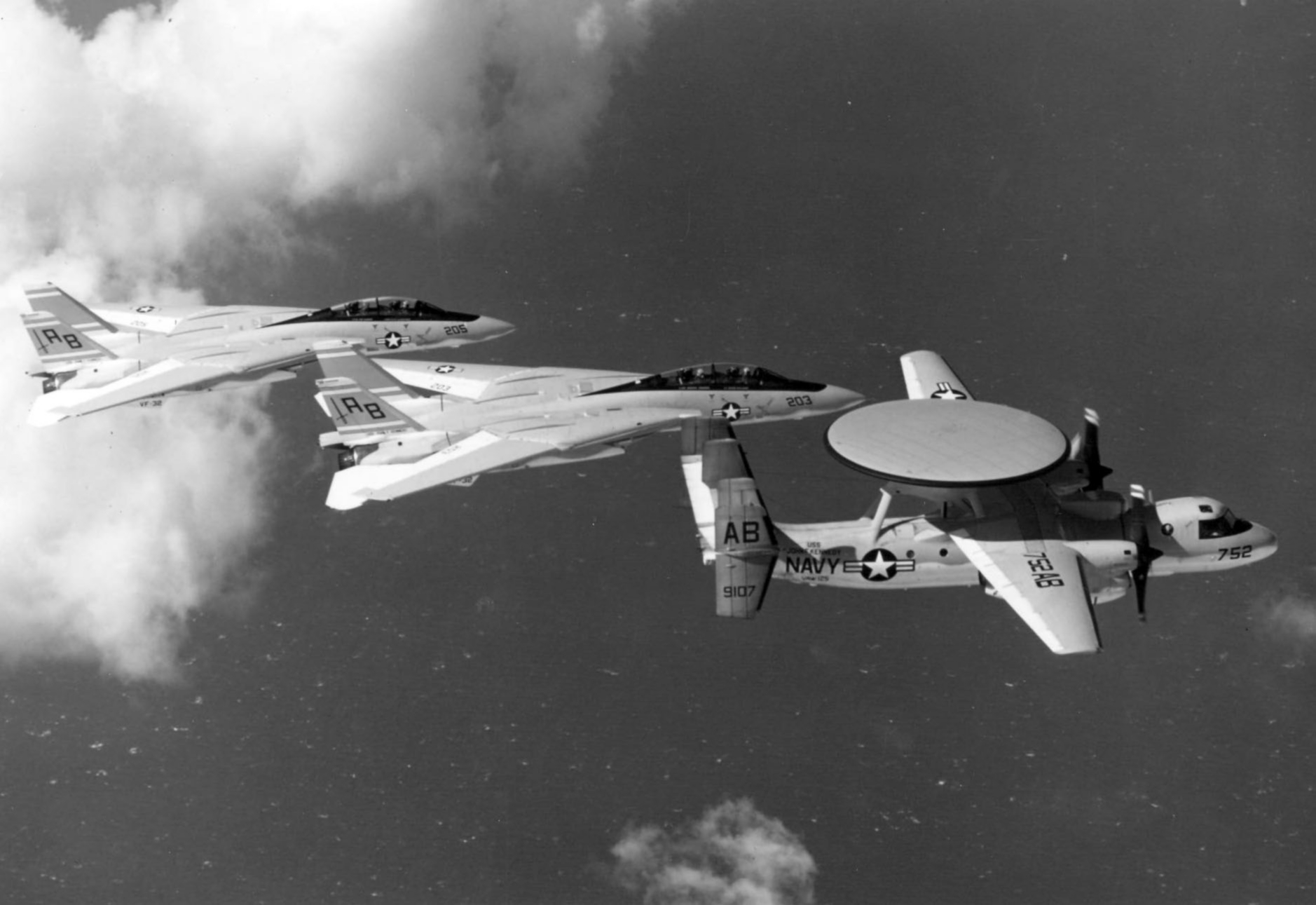
Aircraft from CVW-1 in flight, including a VAW-125 E-2C Hawkeye

In December 1976, Vice Admiral Howard E. Greer, COMNAVAIRLANT, presented VAW-125 with the COMNAVAIRLANT Battle "E" for readiness, the CINCLANTFLT "Golden Anchor" Award for career retention, and the CNO Safety "S" Award. VAW-125 is believed to be the first Navy unit to win all three awards in the same year.

On 14 January 1978, the squadron suffered the loss of an aircraft (BuNo 159107) and the deaths of three aviators. In June, VAW-125 took the E-2C's newest weapons system upgrade, the Advanced Radar Processing System (ARPS), to sea for the first time. The squadron was then assigned to Carrier Air Wing Seventeen (CVW-17) in November 1979, with the squadron making their eighth Mediterranean Sea deployment, this time aboard USS Forrestal.

=== 1980s ===
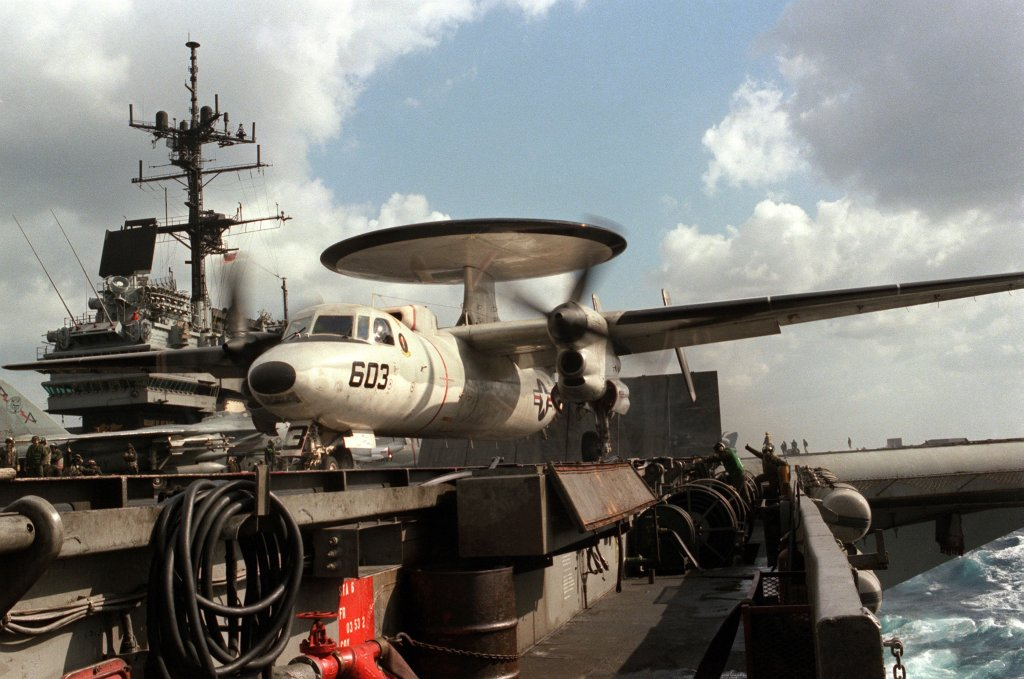
A VAW-125 E-2C prepares to launch from USS Saratoga in 1986.

While deployed in August 1981, VAW-125 participated in Freedom of Navigation (FON) Operations & Open Ocean Missile (OOM) Exercise in the Central Mediterranean Sea and Gulf of Sitra, during which two Libyan MiGs were destroyed after attacking Battle Group aircraft. Upon return from deployment, the squadron provided range control services for the second launch of the NASA space shuttle, STS-2, and detection and monitoring services in the first E-2C Counter-Drug tasking, Operation Thunderbolt.

VAW-125, under the command of CDR Charles "Chuck" Saffell, embarked with CVW-17 in USS Forrestal on June 8, 1982, deploying to the Mediterranean Sea and Indian Ocean. VAW-125 conducted flight operations in the Western Mediterranean on June 24 with aircraft from four carrier air wings in OPERATION DAILY DOUBLE, the first time four U.S. aircraft carriers operated simultaneously in the Mediterranean (USS Forrestal, USS Independence, USS America, and USS John F. Kennedy). Following the exercise, VAW-125 and USS Forrestal proceeded to the Eastern Mediterranean and supported U.S. and United Nations operations in Lebanon, for which Sailors and Marines of the USS Forrestal and USS Independence Battle Groups were awarded the Navy Expeditionary Medal. During this period, Sailors from VAW-125 conducted port calls to Naples, Italy, and Benidorm, Spain. On September 12, VAW-125 and USS Forrestal transited the Suez Canal and operated in the North Arabian Sea for 33 days, returning to the Mediterranean on October 17 and conducting a final port call to Alexandria, Egypt. VAW-125 then returned to the waters off Lebanon for their last line period, prior to returning to the U.S. on November 16, 1982.

VAW-125 and CVW-17 cross-decked to USS Saratoga in 1983, supporting the aircraft carrier as it conducted a number of exercises off the U.S. East Coast. VAW-125 deployed under the command of CDR John Ogle on April 2, 1984, to the Mediterranean Sea aboard USS Saratoga. During this deployment VAW-125 Sailors enjoyed port calls to Naples, Italy; Barcelona, Benidorm, Malaga, and Palma de Mallorca, Spain; Toulon, France; and Tunis, Tunisia. VAW-125 returned to Naval Station Norfolk October 19-20, 1984.

While on a routine deployment in October 1985, the squadron assisted in the successful intercept of the Egyptian airliner carrying the hijackers of the Italian cruise ship, MS Achille Lauro. Squadron aircrew spoke directly to the hijackers, convincing them that the communications were coming from the two VF-103 AND VF-74 F-14s on their wing and persuading the airliner to divert into NAS Sigonella, Sicily.

From January to March 1986, the squadron participated in "Freedom of Navigation" operations off the coast of Libya which escalated with the Action in the Gulf of Sidra in March. In August 1988, the squadron deployed aboard USS Independence for an "Around the Horn" cruise to San Diego, California.

=== 1990s ===
In August 1990, CVW-17 aboard USS Saratoga responded to the invasion of Kuwait by deploying to the Red Sea. VAW-125 and VAW-126 E-2Cs flew around-the-clock as the force build-up of Operation Desert Shield continued. VAW-125 flew over 890 combat hours controlling strikes on Iraqi targets while providing AEW coverage for the Red Sea Battle Group. On a 17 January 1991 strike, squadron aircrew detected two Iraqi MiG-21s threatening the strike group. Controllers vectored two VFA-81 F/A-18s toward the MiGs which recorded the only Navy fixed-wing air-to-air kills of Operation Desert Storm.

In January 1994, the squadron deployed aboard USS Saratoga for her final cruise. During the deployment, the squadron joined NATO forces flying in support of Operations Deny Flight and Provide Promise. The squadron conducted operational tests of the Navy's newest Mini-DAMA Satellite Communication Suite, using this new system, the squadron, for the first time, functioned as an Airborne Battlefield Command and Control Center (ABCCC). With the decommissioning of USS Saratoga, VAW-125 and CVW-17 were deployed aboard USS Enterprise. After completing a two-month Counter-Drug assignment at NS Roosevelt Roads, the squadron deployed to the Mediterranean Sea aboard USS Enterprise in June 1996. In July, the squadron again joined NATO forces in the former Yugoslavia, this time in support of Operation Joint Endeavor. In September, USS Enterprise moved to respond to mounting tensions in Southwest Asia, supporting Operation Southern Watch over the next three months. Squadron pilots earned the CVW-17 "Top Hook" Award for carrier landing performance and the squadron was recognized for its achievements in 1996, being awarded the COMNAVAIRLANT Battle Efficiency Award, the CNO Safety Award, and the VAW community's AEW Excellence Award.

=== 2000s ===
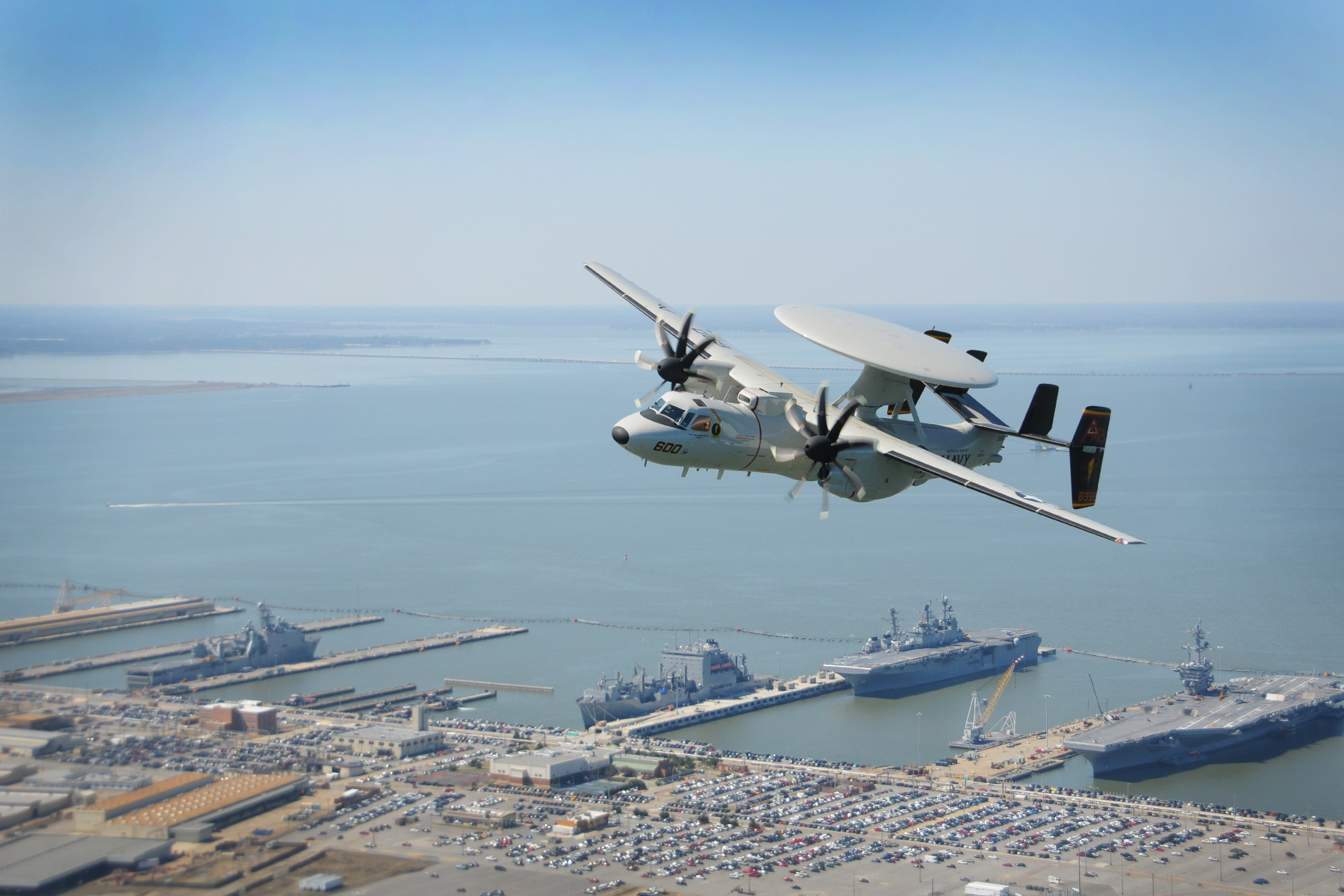
A VAW-125 E-2D Hawkeye flies over NAS Norfolk.

Within hours of the September 11 attacks, squadron personnel were embarked at sea, leaving NS Norfolk to deploy on USS George Washington to support Operation Noble Eagle. Squadron aircraft flew numerous command and control missions in the New York City vicinity in the days following the attacks as commercial air traffic slowly resumed. During this cruise, the squadron surpassed a 32-year Class "A" mishap-free milestone with over 64,000 flight hours.

In April 2003, the squadron became the first East Coast squadron to transition to the E-2C Hawkeye 2000, which boasted improved electrical and vapor cycle systems, mission computer and display stations, and Cooperative Engagement Capability (CEC). The squadron participated in the Operational Evaluation of the AN/USG-3 airborne node of the Navy's net-centric CEC sensor fusion system.

While deployed aboard USS Dwight D. Eisenhower in the Central Persian Gulf, North Arabian Sea, and Western Indian Ocean VAW-125 played roles in the US War on Terror, Operation Enduring Freedom, and operations off the coast of Somalia.

=== 2010s ===
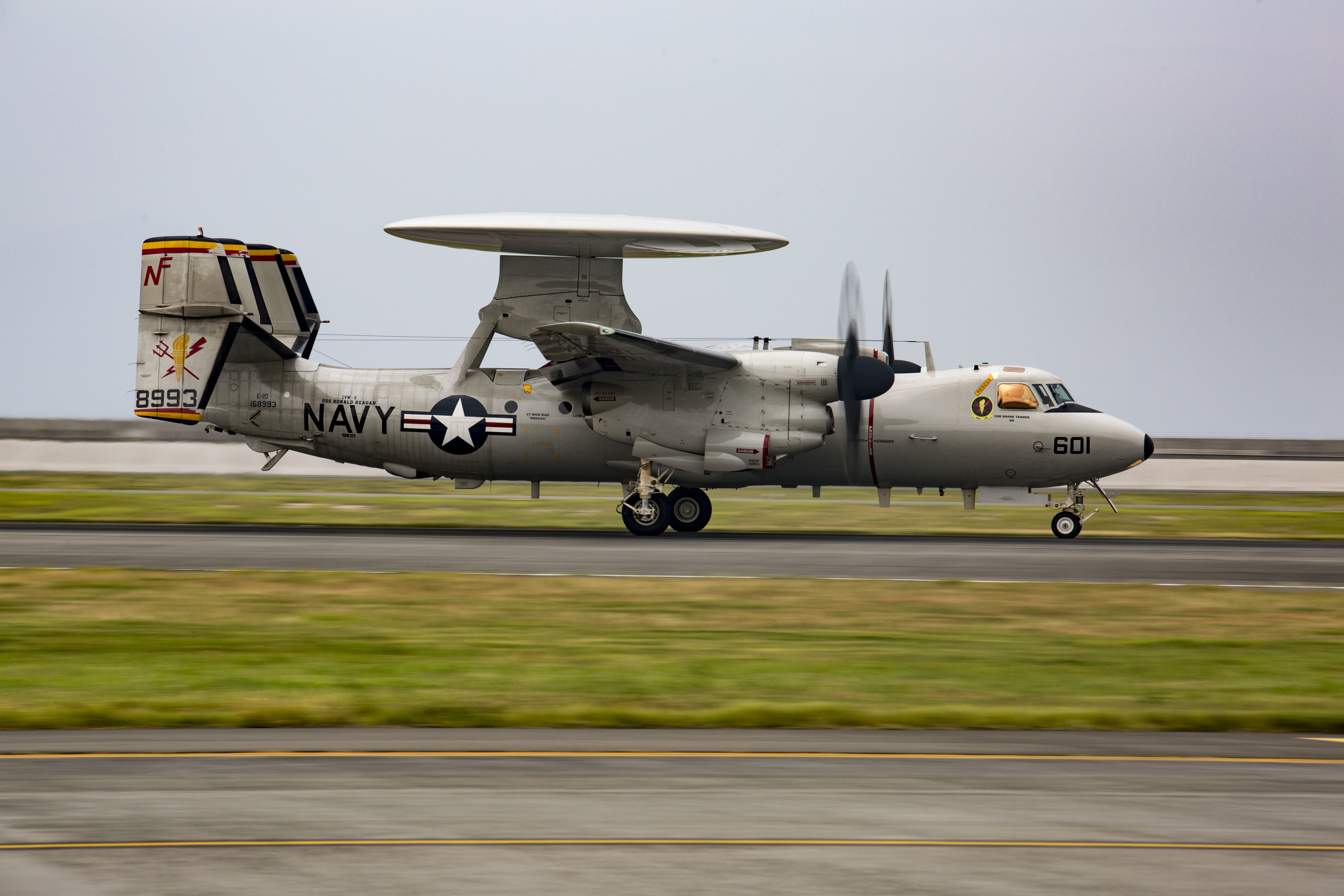
A VAW-125 E-2D Hawkeye lands at MCAS Iwakuni on 9 August 2017.

In January 2010, the squadron was deployed to Naval Station Guantanamo Bay, Cuba, in support of Operation Unified Response providing humanitarian assistance following the 2010 Haiti earthquake. The squadron flew missions to provide communications relay, command and control, and general airborne radar services allowing forces afloat and ashore to distribute thousands of tons of rations, water, and medical supplies. The squadron then joined USS Carl Vinson on its trip around South America as it returned from Norfolk to its home port in San Diego.

In March 2015, the squadron departed with USS Theodore Roosevelt to the Middle East as part the first deployment of Naval Integrated Fire Control-Counter Air (NIFC-CA) Carrier Strike Group.

On 2 February 2017, VAW-125 arrived at Marine Corps Air Station Iwakuni, Japan. It replaced VAW-115 in Carrier Air Wing Five aboard the aircraft carrier USS Ronald Reagan. The squadron made its first deployment aboard Ronald Reagan from 16 May to 9 August 2017.

=== 2020s ===
CVW-5 was reassigned to George Washington when it replaced Ronald Reagan in Japan on 22 November 2024.[12]

In August 2026, VAW-125 as part of CVW-5 onboard the USS George Washington arrived in the CENTCOM AOR. VAW-125 and their E-2Ds then began undertaking combat missions against Iran within Operation Epic Fury

== Deployments and awards ==
=== Shipborne deployments and assignments ===
Aircraft Carrier	Air Wing	Deployment dates
USS Saratoga	CVW-3	3 deployments between March 1969 & January 1970
USS John F. Kennedy	CVW-1	9 deployments between September 1970 & August 1977
USS Dwight D. Eisenhower	CVW-1	November 1977 – December 1977
USS John F. Kennedy	CVW-1	June 1978 – August 1977
USS Forrestal	CVW-17	3 Deployments between November 1979 & November 1982
USS Saratoga	CVW-17	3 Deployments between April 1984 & November 1992
USS Constellation	CVW-17	March 1993 – April 1993
USS Saratoga	CVW-17	January 1994 – June 1994
USS Enterprise	CVW-17	2 Deployments between February 1996 & December 1996
USS Dwight D. Eisenhower	CVW-17	June 1998 – December 1998
USS George Washington	CVW-17	2 Deployments between June 2000 & December 2002
USS John F. Kennedy	CVW-17	June 2004 – December 2004
USS Dwight D. Eisenhower	CVW-7	October 2006 – May 2007
USS Carl Vinson	CVW-17	3 Deployments between February 2010 & May 2012
USS Theodore Roosevelt	CVW-1	March 2015 – February 2017
USS Ronald Reagan	CVW-5	2 February 2017 to 23 July 2024
USS George Washington	CVW-5	1 October 2024 to present

=== Awards ===
VAW-125 has been presented with the following unit awards and campaign medals:

Ribbon	Unit Award & Campaign Streamers	Date's & Notes
	3 Navy Unit Commendations	10 October 1985 – 11 October 1985; 23 March 1986 – 29 March 1986; 17 January 1991 – 28 February 1991
	7 Navy Meritorious Unit commendations	29 September 1970 – 31 October 1970; 1 January 1976 – 31 December 1976; 1 December 1977 – 1 March 1979; 1 October 1981 – 30 June 1983; 10 June 1998 – 10 December 1998 (to Battle Force 6th Fleet); 30 October 2006 – 4 May 2007 (to Eisenhower Carrier Strikegroup); 30 November 2011 – 23 May 2012 (to COMCARSTRKGRU1)
	6 Navy "E" Ribbons	1 July 1975 – 30 September 1976; 1 January 1985 – 31 December 1985; 1 January 1992 – December 1992; 1 January 1996 – 31 December 1996; 1 January 2000 – 31 December 2000; 1 January 2002 – 31 December 2002
	2 Navy Expeditionary Medals	5 September 1982 – 10 September 1982 and 13 October 1982 – 5 November 1982 for Lebanon; 20 January 1986 – 29 March 1986 for Libya
	Armed Forces Service Medal	8 September 1992 – 13 September 1992; 19 September 1992 – 20 September 1992; 1 February 1994 – 10 March 1994; 20 March 1994 – 25 March 1994; 1 April 1994 – 6 April 1994; 17 April 1994 – 30 April 1994; 16 July 1996 – 21 July 1996; 9 September 1996 – 13 September 1996; All for Bosnia
	Humanitarian Service Medal	To a Detachment from VAW 125; 15 January 2010 – 1 February 2010
	Southwest Asia Service Medal	23 October 1990 – 9 December 1990; 6 January 1991 – 11 March 1991

== See also ==
- History of the United States Navy
- List of United States Navy aircraft squadrons
