= Carrier Strike Group 1 =

Carrier Strike Group One
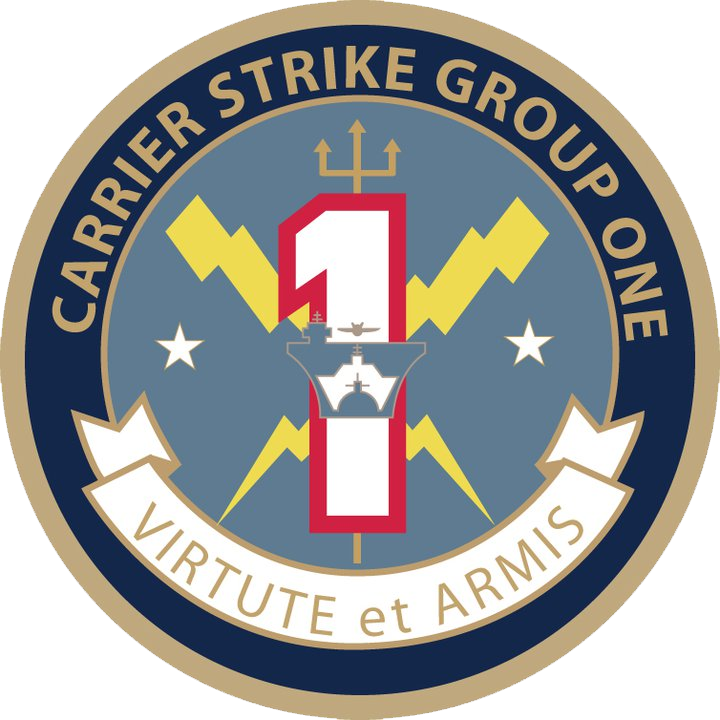
- Carrier Strike Group One emblem
- Active: 1 October 2009 – present
- Country: United States of America
- Branch: United States Navy
- Type: Carrier Strike Group
- Role: Naval air/surface warfare
- Part of: U.S. Third Fleet
- Garrison/HQ: Naval Air Station North Island; San Diego, California
- Nicknames: Carl Vinson Carrier Strike Group; Team Carl Vinson; Team Vinson
- Mottos: Virtute et Armis ("By Valor and Arms") (Note: The motto of Mississippi.)
- Engagements: War in Afghanistan; Iraq War; Operation Inherent Resolve: US intervention in the Syrian civil war

Commanders
- Commander: Rear Admiral Jay Clark
- Chief of Staff: Captain Michael Smith
- Command Master Chief: Master Chief Petty Officer Benjamin H. Bilyeu

Aircraft flown
- Electronic warfare: EA-18G Growler
- Fighter: F/A-18E/F Super Hornet; F-35C Lightning II
- Helicopter: MH-60S Knighthawk; MH-60R Seahawk
- Reconnaissance: E-2C Hawkeye
- Transport: V-22 Osprey

Carrier Strike Group One (CSG-1 or CARSTRKGRU 1) is a U.S. Navy carrier strike group. USS Carl Vinson (CVN-70) is the strike group's current flagship, which currently consists of Carrier Air Wing 2, the Ticonderoga-class guided-missile cruiser USS Princeton and DESRON 1, which includes the Arleigh Burke class guided-missile destroyers USS Hopper, USS Kidd, USS Sterett and the USS William P. Lawrence.

Although the previous Carrier Strike Group One traced its history to Carrier Division 1, formed in 1930, the current Carrier Strike Group One was an entirely new naval formation when it was established in October 2009. During the relocation of its flagship Carl Vinson to its new home base in San Diego, California, it supported Operation Unified Response, providing humanitarian assistance following the 2010 Haiti earthquake. During its first overseas deployment in 2011, the body of Osama bin Laden was flown to the Carl Vinson for burial at sea. Carrier Strike Group One was the second U.S. Navy carrier force to participate in Operation Inherent Resolve.

== History ==
=== Second World War to 2004 ===
Carrier Strike Group 1 traces its lineage to Carrier Division 1 (CarDiv 1), the U.S. Navy's first seagoing naval aviation formation. It was first organized in October 1930 as part of the Aircraft Scouting Force, U.S. Fleet in the Atlantic. It initially included the U.S. Navy's first aircraft carrier, the Langley, as well as the aircraft tender Wright and the minesweepers Sandpiper and Teal. In 1933, USS Saratoga (CV-3) was reassigned to Carrier Division One under Commander Aircraft, Scouting Force, which also included aircraft tender Wright; the minesweepers Lapwing, Teal, and Swan; and the rigid airships Akron and Macon. Carrier Division One was initially headquartered at the Coco Solo Naval Air Station located on the Atlantic side of the Panama Canal Zone near Colón, Panama. In 1939, Carrier Division One was transferred to the Pacific Scouting Force. Division aircraft carriers saw service in World War II, the Korean War, and the Vietnam War.

Rear Admiral John H. Cassady served as Commander Carrier Division 1 immediately after the end of Second World War. In this capacity, Cassady commanded Task Group 21.11, led by the carrier Midway, during Operation Frostbite in February 1946. This naval exercise involved the embarked Air Group 74 conducting flight operations in Davis Straits between Labrador and Greenland. Previously, U.S. Naval carrier aviation had virtually no experience operating in Arctic waters. Subsequently, Admiral Cassady commanded Task Group 125.4, consisting of the carrier Franklin D. Roosevelt; the cruiser Little Rock; and the destroyers New, Cone, and Corry, which paid a highly publicized port visit to Piraeus, Greece, in September 1946. In conjunction with earlier visits, including that of USS Missouri (BB-63) to Turkey, this port call demonstrated U.S. support to Greece and Turkey in the face of Soviet pressure. According to James Chace, the deployment of Task Group 125.4 "symbolized" American resolve against that Soviet pressure, marking the true beginning of the Cold War. In 1952 Commander Carrier Division 1 was flying his flag aboard USS Bon Homme Richard (CV-31) off Korea. In August 1955, Carrier Division 1 comprised USS Yorktown (CV-10) at Puget Sound (in refit, receiving an angled flight deck), USS Hornet (CV-12) at San Francisco, and USS Hancock (CV-19), and USS Boxer (CV-21) both at San Diego.

In 1968, Carrier Division 1, under the command of Rear Admiral Epes, became involved in the response to the seizure of the USS Pueblo.

In June 1973, Carrier Division 1 was redesignated Carrier Group 1 (CarGru 1), and in January 1974, it was located at Naval Air Station North Island (NASNI) in San Diego, California. Despite being headquartered at North Island, it was responsible for the Midway, which with Carrier Air Wing Five aboard had moved to United States Fleet Activities Yokosuka, Japan, on 5 October 1973. The move was the result of an accord signed on 31 August 1972 between the U.S. and Japan. In addition to the morale factor of dependents housed alongside the crew, the move allowed continuous positioning of three carriers on the Pacific Rim at a time when the economic situation demanded the reduction of carriers in the fleet. In 1984 the group was led by USS Constellation (CVA-64). In December 1990, following commanding Battle Group Delta, ComCarGru 1 was designated Commander, Training Battle Group, with responsibility for the Carrier Battle Group Inter-Deployment Training Cycle for the Pacific Fleet. In 1996 the group was commanded by Timothy Beard.

On 1 October 2004, Carrier Group 1 became Carrier Strike Group 1. In 2005, it was redesignated Commander, Strike Force Training Pacific. On 1 October 2009, Carrier Strike Group 1 was re-established based at Naval Base Point Loma, California under Rear Admiral Ted N. Branch.

=== 2010 operations ===
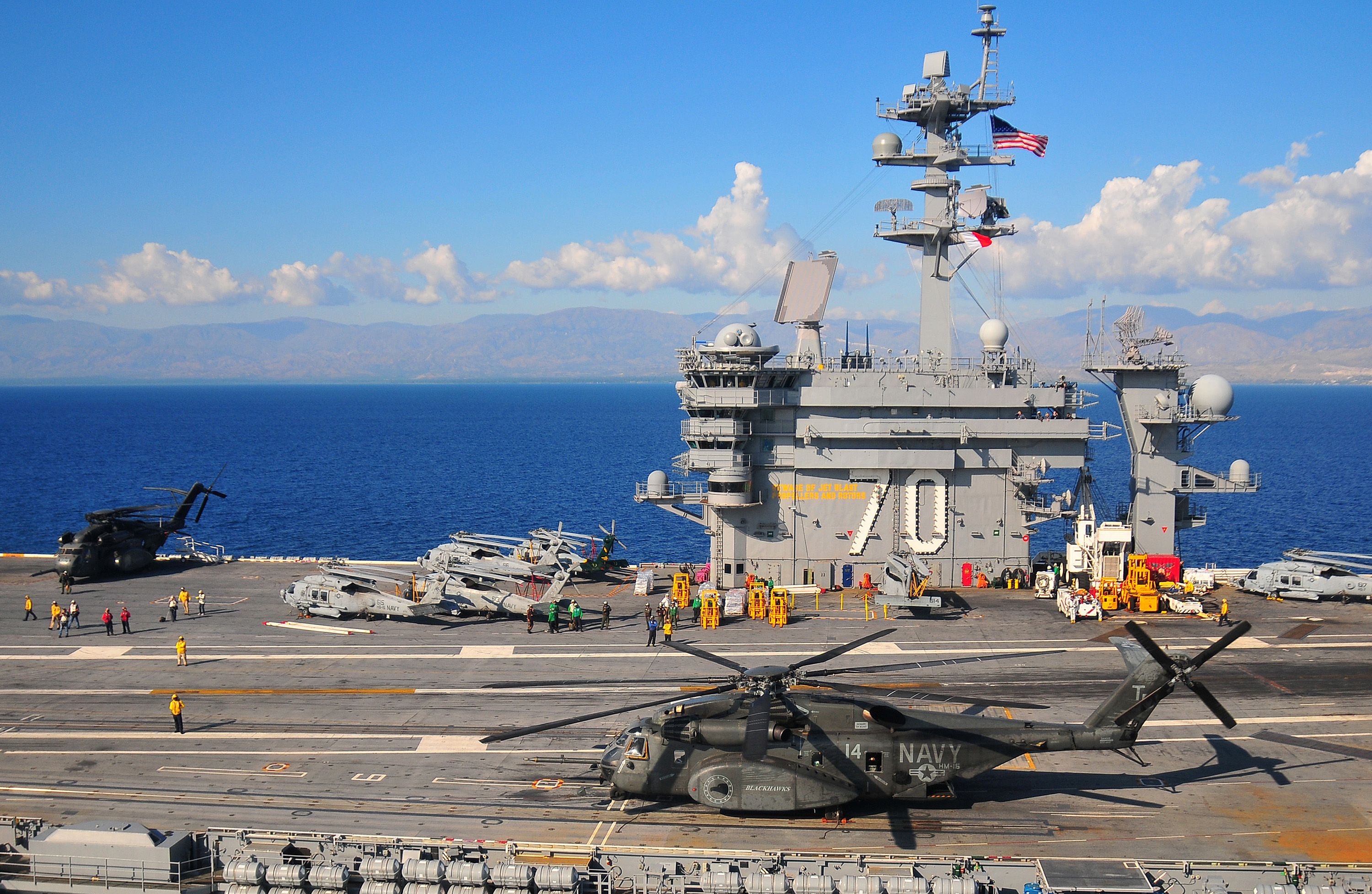
USS Carl Vinson operating off the coast of Haiti (15 January 2010).

On 12 January 2010, Carl Vinson departed Naval Station Norfolk for its new homeport of San Diego with squadrons VFA-81, VAW-125, VRC-40, and HS-15 embarked.

Just hours after the 2010 Haiti earthquake, Carl Vinson was redirected from the North Atlantic to Haiti to contribute to the Operation Unified Response relief effort. On 15 January, the Carl Vinson arrived off the coast of Port-au-Prince (pictured) to provide humanitarian aid, with its trained personnel, emergency relief supplies, and 19 helicopters on deck. On 16 January, the Bunker Hill arrived in Haiti to assist the Carl Vinson. In addition to providing medical relief, Carl Vinson's desalination capacity provided fresh drinkable water to Haiti's population. In total, the Carl Vinson delivered 1,095,442 lbs. (496,884 kg) of food; 147,591 gallons (558,693 liters) of potable water; and more than 40,000 lbs. (18,143 kg) of medical supplies. The ship's medical team treated 60 patients. The Carl Vinson's embarked helicopters flew 1,299 sorties, conducted 1,152 medical evacuations, and delivered more than 2,900,000 lbs. (1,315,418 kg) of cargo ashore. On 1 February, the Carl Vinson, the cruiser Bunker Hill, and the oceanographic survey ship Henson ended their mission and departed Haiti although ten of Carl Vinson's helicopters remained to support the relief effort.

In March 2010, during her transit around South America, the carrier strike group participated in Southern Seas 2010 naval maneuvers with the Brazilian, Uruguayan, and Argentine navies. The group also paid port visits to Rio de Janeiro, Brazil, and Callao, Peru. Carl Vinson arrived at its new homeport on 12 April 2010 following a three-month underway period.

=== 2010–2011 deployment ===
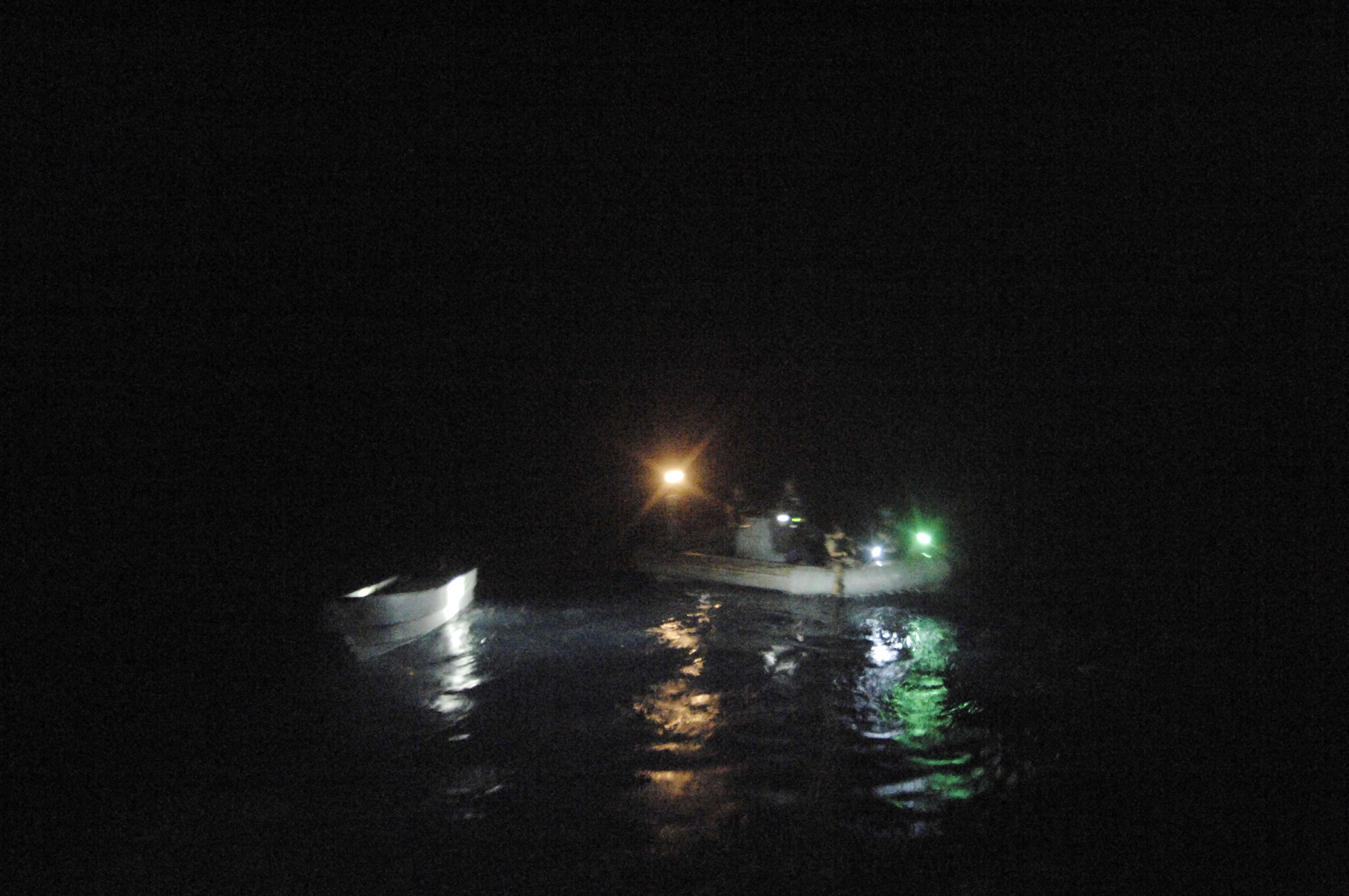
Full City incident (5 May 2011)

On 26 October 2010, Rear Admiral Samuel Perez, Jr. took command of the group. The group departed California for its 2010–11 deployment on 30 October. During the deployment, Carrier Air Wing Seventeen flew 1,656 combat air sorties, logging a total of 9,140 flight hours while 33 bombs and 2,970 rounds of 20-mm ammunition were expended.

On 5 May 2011, as part of NATO's counter-piracy Operation Ocean Shield, Vinson, Bunker Hill, and the Turkish frigate Giresun responded to a distress call from the Panamanian-flagged, Chinese-owned bulk carrier Full City. An Indian Navy Tu-142 maritime patrol aircraft located the Full City, and while Giresun boarded the merchant vessel, Bunker Hill and its embarked HS-49 helicopters intercepted a dhow believed to be the 'mothership' for the pirate attack. Bunker Hill's boarding party seized weapons and other equipment commonly used in piracy, and the boarding party also sank a small skiff being towed by the dhow. Giresun's boarding party found the Full City's Chinese crew safe and in control of their ship. On 15 June 2011, Carl Vinson returned to its homeport of Naval Station San Diego, California.

2010–2011 deployment force composition

CARSTRKGRU 1 Warships	Carrier Air Wing Seventeen (CVW-17) squadrons embarked aboard flagship USS Carl Vinson (CVN-70)	
USS Bunker Hill (CG-52)	Strike Fighter Squadron 113 (VFA-113): 10 F/A-18C	Tactical Electronics Warfare Squadron 134 (VAQ-134): 4 EA-6B
USS Stockdale (DDG-106)	Strike Fighter Squadron 81 (VFA-81): 10 F/A-18E	Carrier Airborne Early Warning Squadron 125 (VAW-125): 4 E-2C
USS Gridley (DDG-101)	Strike Fighter Squadron 25 (VFA-25): 10 F/A-18C	Helicopter Anti-Submarine Squadron 15 (HS-15): 7 HH-60F/SH-60F
USS Higgins (DDG-76)	Strike Fighter Squadron 22 (VFA-22): 12 F/A-18F	Fleet Logistics Support Squadron 40 (VRC-40), Det.4: 2 C-2A

2010–2011 deployment exercises and port visits

Number	Regional Exercises				Port Visits		Notes
Number	Duration	U.S. Force	Bilateral/Multilateral Partner(s)	Operating Area	Location	Dates	Notes
1st:	10 January 2011	Stockdale, Gridley	PASSEX: Japan Maritime Self-Defense Force, Republic of Korea Navy	Sea of Japan	—-	—-	
2nd:	—-	Carrier Strike Group One	—-	—-	Chinhae & Busan, ROK	11–14 Jan 2011	
3rd:	26 January 2011	Carrier Strike Group One	PASSEX: Royal Malaysian Navy	Straits of Malacca	—-	—-	
4th:	—-	Higgins	—-	—-	Phuket, Thailand	17–21 Feb 2011	
5th:	25–26 Feb 2011	Higgins	Maritime Domain Awareness: Maldivian Coast Guard	In-port	Maldives	25–26 Feb 2011	
6th:	—-	Carrier Strike Group One	—-	—-	Port Klang, Malaysia	13 February 2011	
7th:	—-	Carrier Strike Group One	—-	—-	Manila, Philippines	15–19 May 2011	
8th:	—-	Carrier Strike Group One	—-	—-	Hong Kong	22–24 May 2011	
9th:	—-	Carrier Strike Group One	—-	—-	Pearl Harbor–Hickam	7–9 June 2011	

=== 2011–2012 deployment ===
On 18 November 2011, Rear Admiral Thomas K. Shannon took command of Carrier Strike Group One. On 30 November 2011, the strike group departed Naval Air Station North Island, California, for its 2011–2012 deployment.

On 10 January 2012, two guided-missile destroyers from Destroyer Squadron One, Stockdale and Gridley, and their embarked detachments from helicopter squadron HSL-49 participated in a passing exercise with the Japanese helicopter destroyer Kurama in the Sea of Japan. Later in the same day, Stockdale and Gridley participated in separate maneuvers with units of the Republic of Korea Navy. Also, during its maiden deployment, the new British guided-missile destroyer Daring operated with Carrier Strike Group One and Carrier Strike Group Nine in the Persian Gulf and North Arabian Sea. On 19 January 2012, while serving as the flagship of Combined Task Force 151, the destroyer Halsey and its HSL-49 helicopter detachment responded to a distress call from M/V Albrouj, a Yemeni dhow en route to Somalia from Yemen.

Carrier Strike Group One joined Carrier Strike Group Three, led by the carrier John C. Stennis, in the North Arabian Sea, with Carrier Strike Group Nine, led by the carrier Abraham Lincoln, en route to the Arabian Sea amid rising tension between the United States and the Islamic Republic of Iran over U.S. naval access to the Strait of Hormuz.

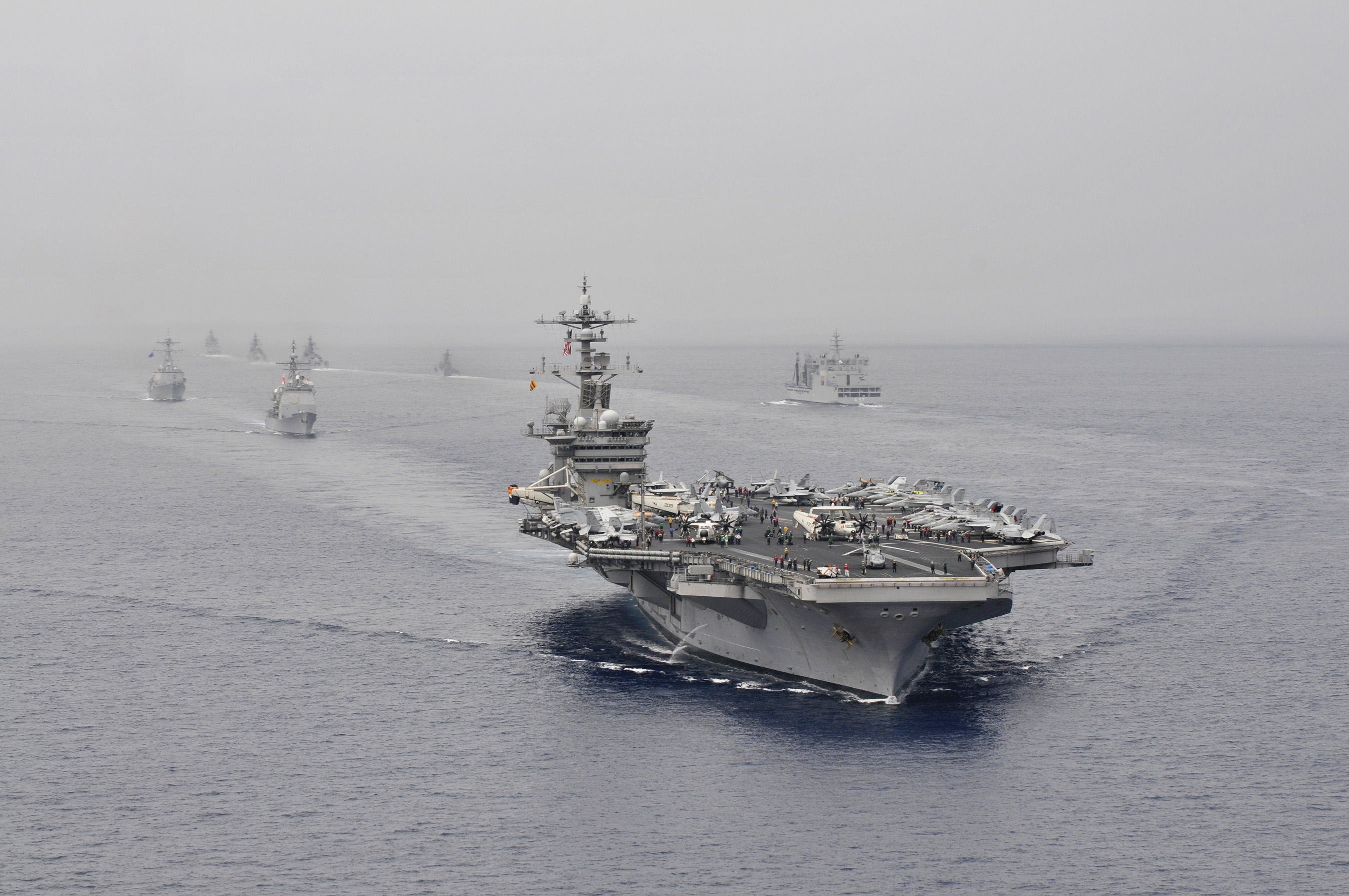
Malabar 2012 (16 April 2012)

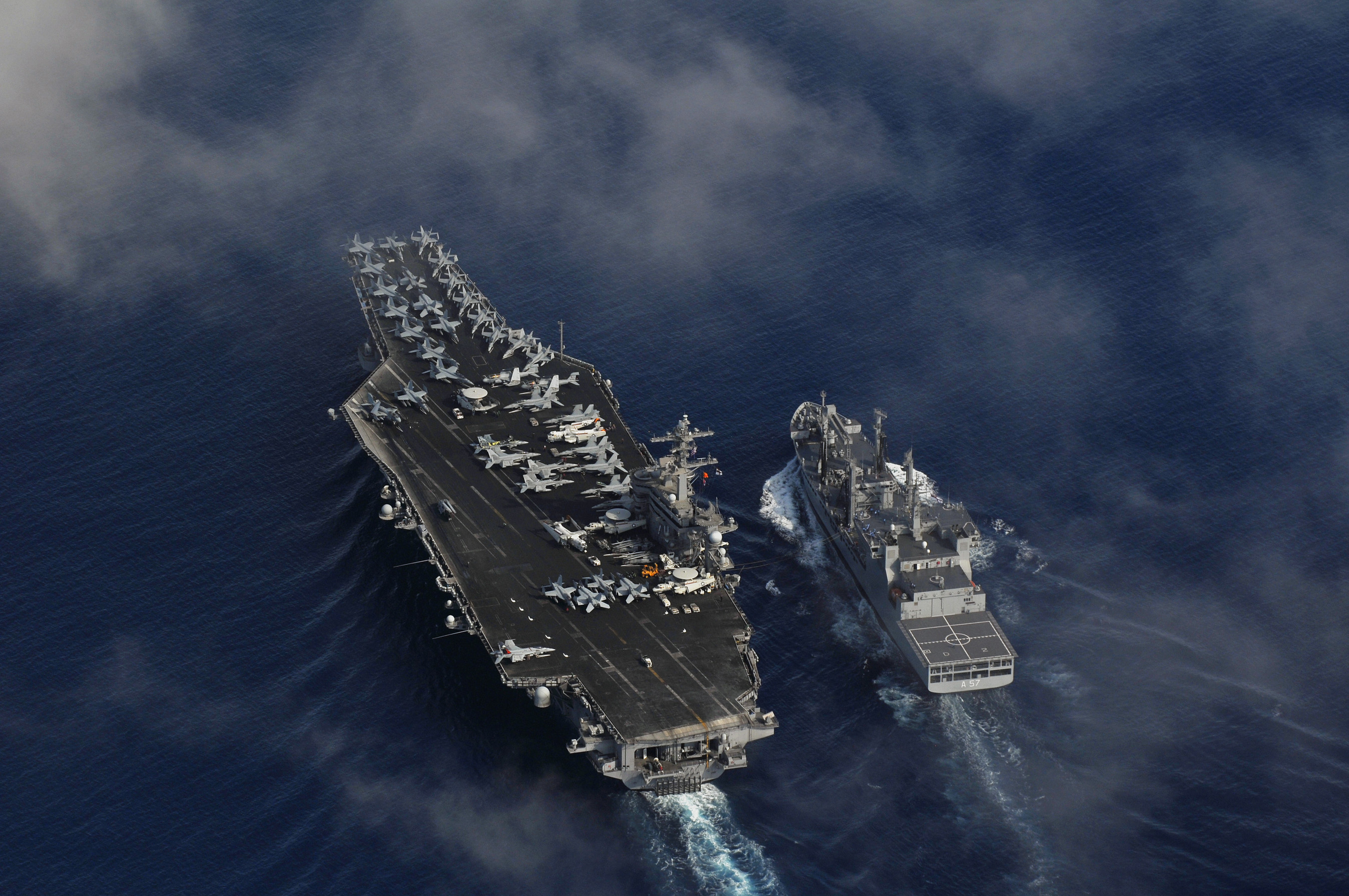
INS Shakti replenishing USS Carl Vinson during Malabar 2012.

While with the Seventh Fleet, between 9–16 April 2012, Carrier Strike Group One participated in Malabar 2012 with the Indian Navy (pictured) during its Western Pacific deployment. Ships of the strike group paid a port visit to Brisbane on 5 May 2012 to mark the 70th anniversary of the Battle of Coral Sea. Between 7–16 May 2012, Carrier Strike Group One became the first U.S. Navy carrier strike group to participate in the Oceania Maritime Security Initiative, a maritime law enforcement operation within the exclusive economic zones of various South Pacific states.

On 11 May 2012, Carrier Strike Group One entered the U.S. Third Fleet area of responsibility. On 23 May 2012, the carrier Carl Vinson, the cruiser Bunker Hill, and the destroyer Halsey returned to Naval Air Station North Island, California, concluding the six-month-long 2011–2012 deployment for Carrier Strike Group One. During this deployment, aircraft from Carrier Strike Group One flew 1,085 missions in support of ground forces in Afghanistan, totaling 6,600 flight hours, while delivering 7,283 pounds (3.3 MT) of ordnance and expending 1,717 rounds of 20-mm ammunition in support of coalition operations in Afghanistan.

2011–2012 deployment force composition

CARSTRKGRU 1 Warships	Carrier Air Wing Seventeen(CVW-17) squadrons embarked aboard flagship USS Carl Vinson (CVN-70)	
USS Bunker Hill (CG-52)	Strike Fighter Squadron 113 (VFA-113): 10 F/A-18C	Electronic Attack Squadron 134 (VAQ-134): 4 EA-6B
USS Halsey (DDG-97)	Strike Fighter Squadron 81 (VFA-81): 10 F/A-18E	Carrier Airborne Early Warning Squadron 125 (VAW-125): 4 E-2C
—	Strike Fighter Squadron 25 (VFA-25): 10 F/A-18C	Helicopter Anti-Submarine Squadron 15 (HS-15): 7 HH-60F/SH-60F
—	Strike Fighter Squadron 22 (VFA-22): 12 F/A-18F	Fleet Logistics Support Squadron 40 (VRC-40), Det.4: 2 C-2A

2011–2012 deployment exercises and port visits

Number	Regional Exercises				Port Visits		Notes
Number	Duration	U.S. Force	Bilateral/Multilateral Partner(s)	Operating Area	Location	Dates	Notes
1st:	—	Carrier Strike Group One	—	—	Hong Kong	27–30 Dec 2011	
2nd:	—	Carrier Strike Group One	—	—	Jebel Ali, UAE	19–21 Feb 2012	
3rd:	—	Carrier Strike Group One	—	—	Jebel Ali, UAE	23–26 Mar 2012	
4th:	9–16 Apr 2012	Carrier Strike Group One (Note: U.S. naval vessels included the carrier Carl Vinson, the cruiser Bunker Hill, the destroyer Halsey, the submarine Louisville, and the fast combat support ship Bridge.)	Malabar 2012: Indian Navy (Note: Indian naval vessels included the destroyers Ranvir and Ranvijay; the frigate Satpura; the corvette Kulish, and the fleet tanker Shakti)	Bay of Bengal	Chennai, India	7–8 Apr 2012	
5th:	—	Carl Vinson, Bunker Hill	—	—	Fremantle, Australia	24–28 Apr 2012	
6th:	—	Halsey	—	—	Brisbane, Australia	5 May 2012	
7th:	—	Carl Vinson	—	—	Pearl Harbor, Hawaii	15 May 2012	

=== 2012–2014 operations ===
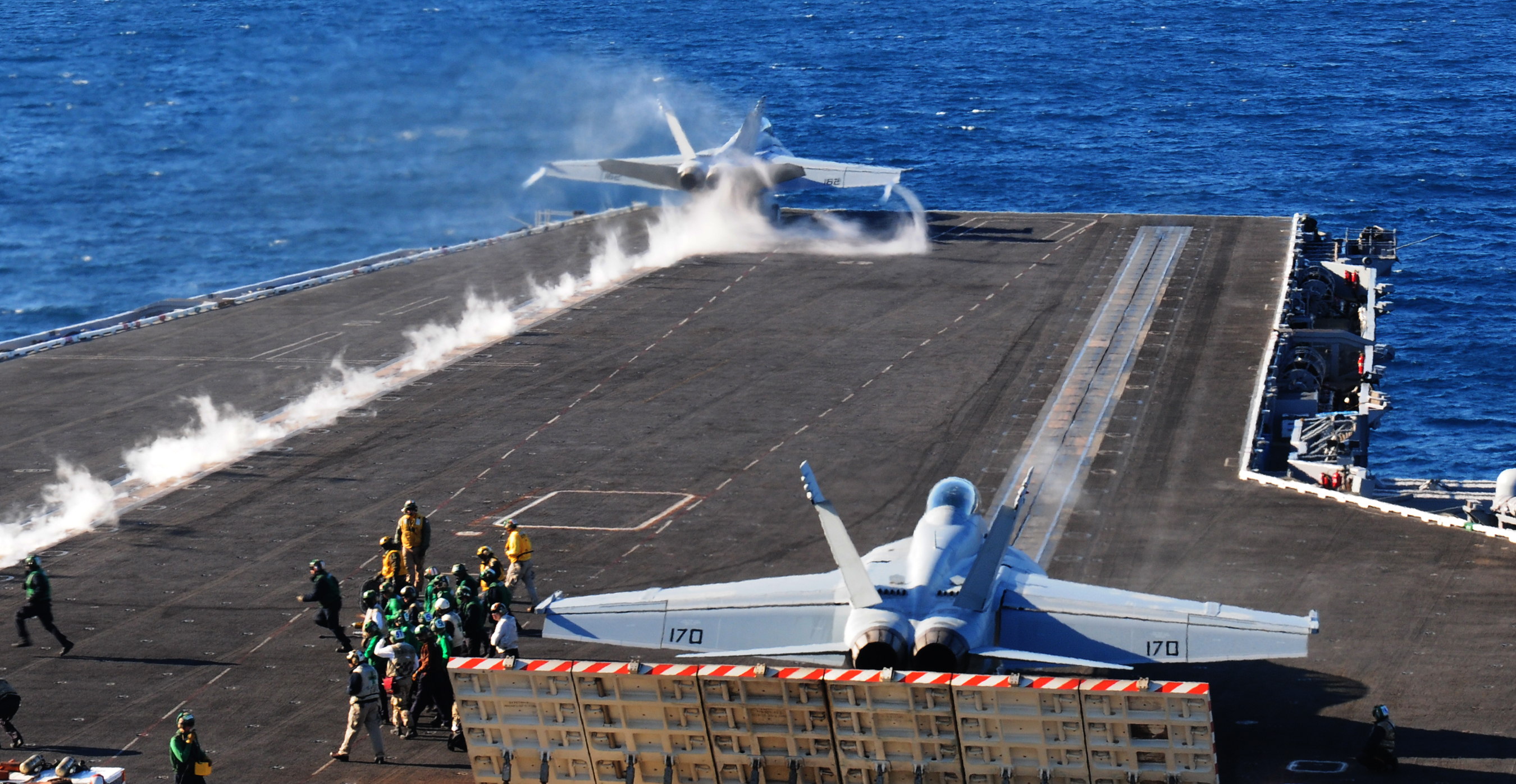
Carrier qualifications (25 February 2013)

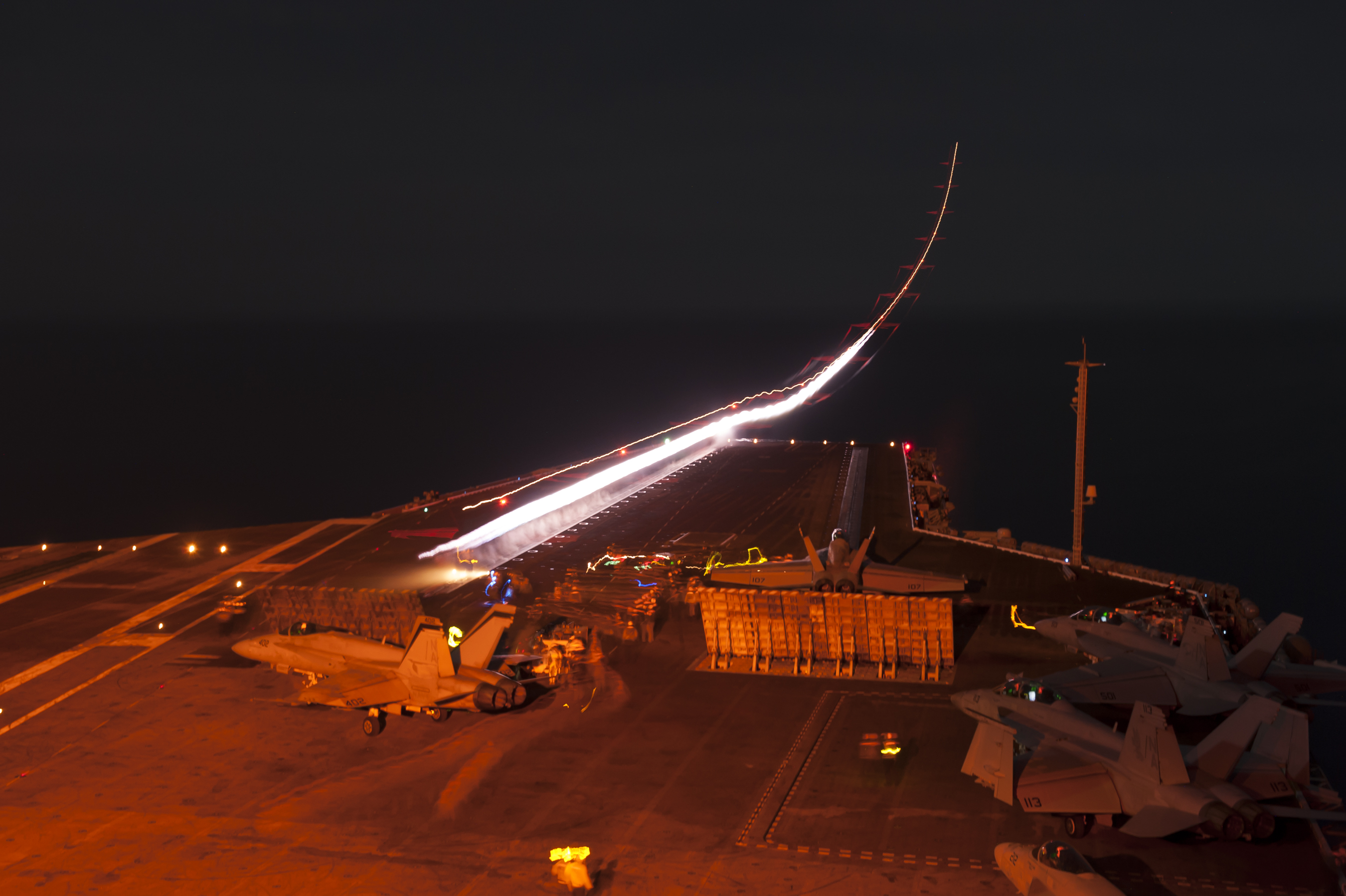
Flight operations (18 January 2013)

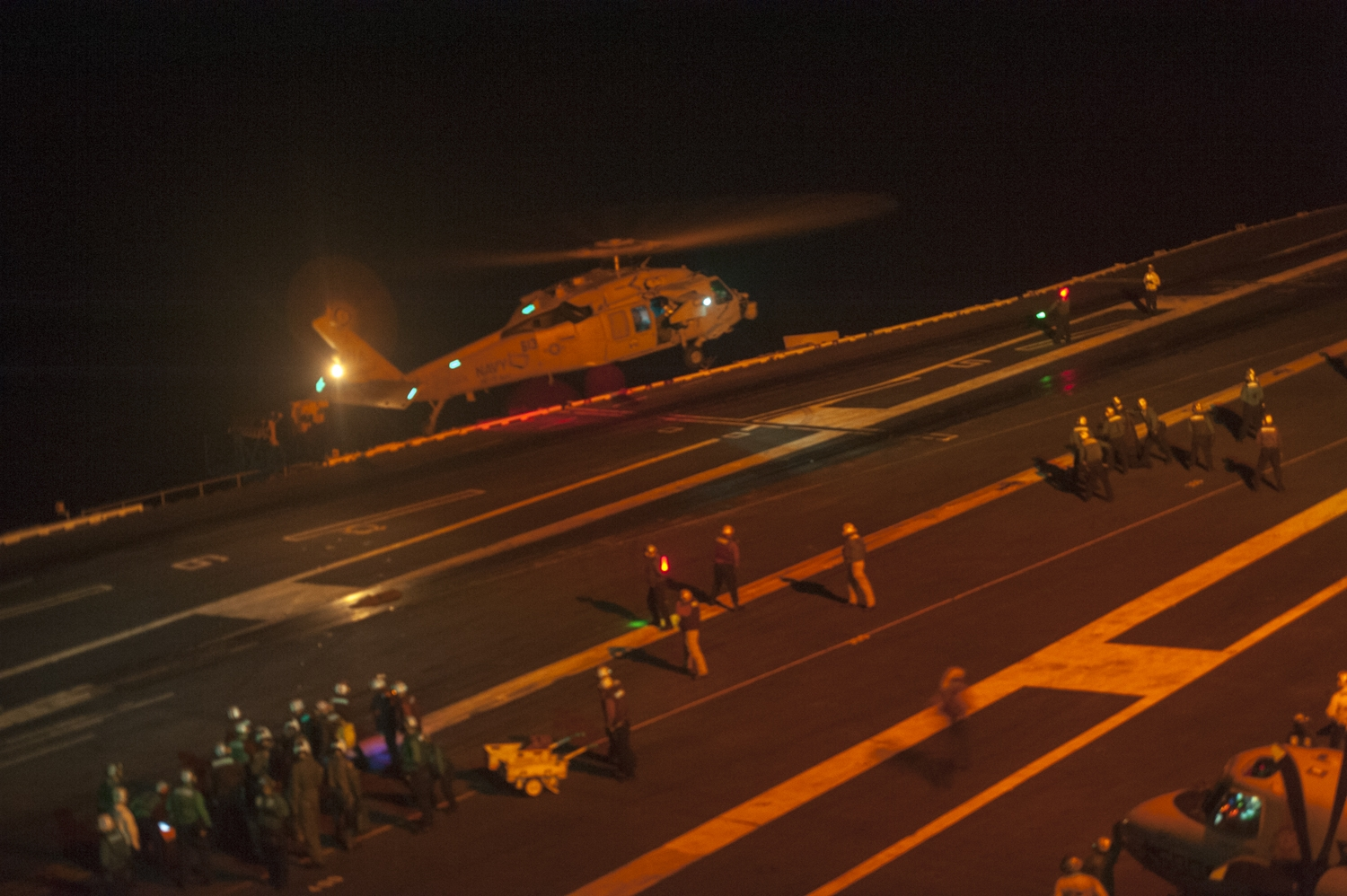
Rescue operations (12 September 2014)

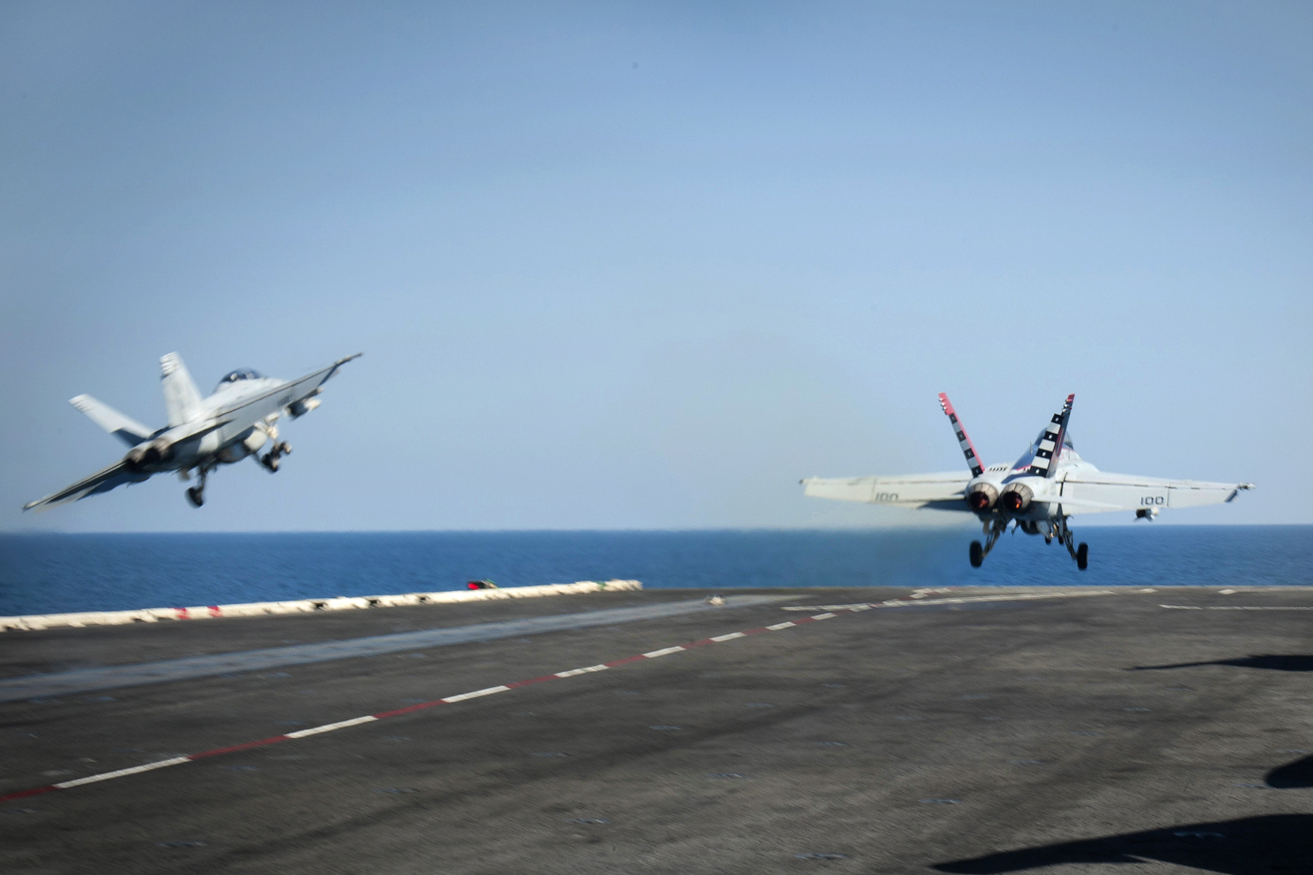
Operation Inherent Resolve (18 October 2014)

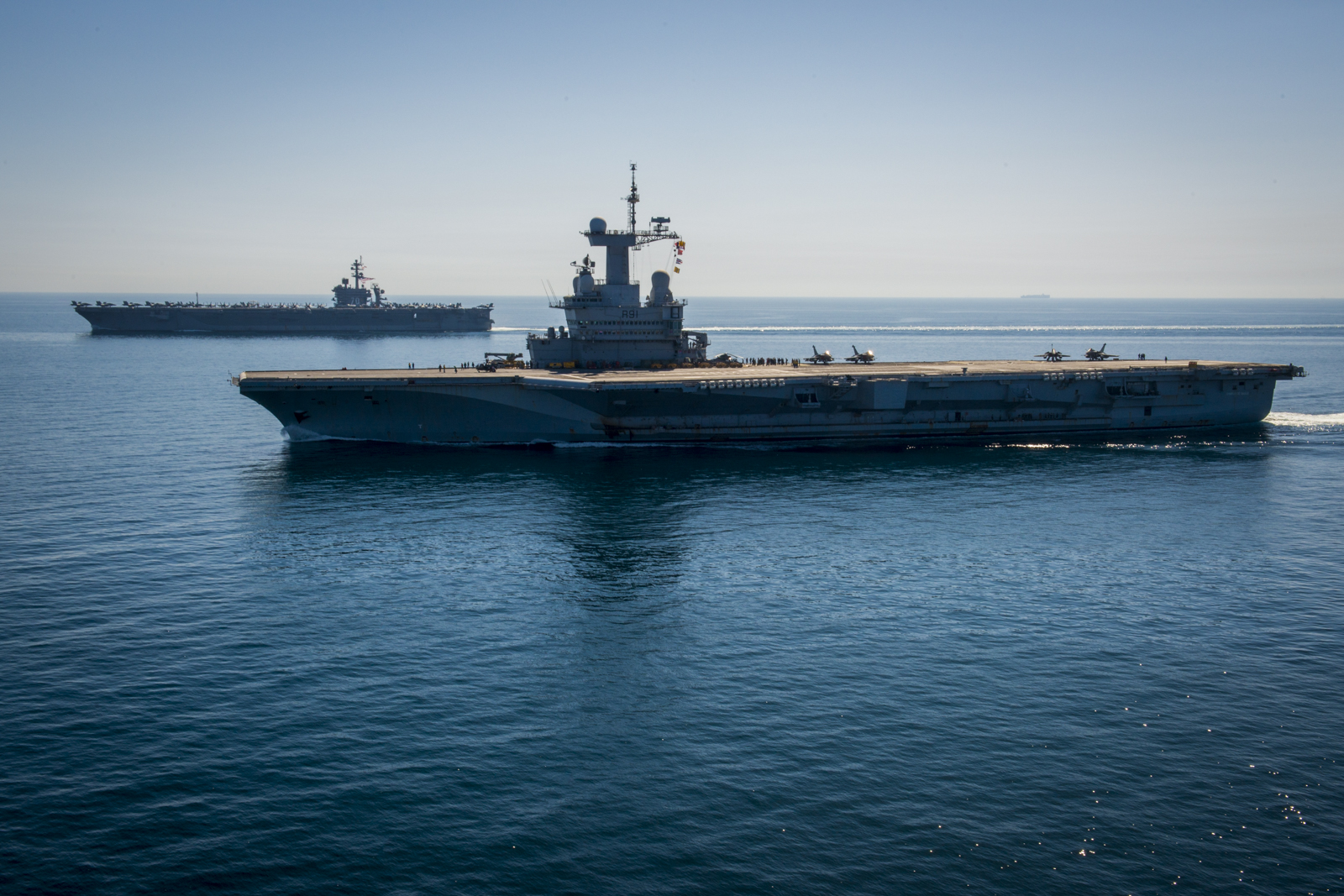
Charles de Gaulle

On 5 July 2012, the carrier Carl Vinson began a planned incremental availability (PIA) overhaul to undergo major maintenance and modernization, with a scheduled completion date of 1 February 2013. The Carl Vinson completed its maintenance on 3 February 2013 and began carrier qualifications with Carrier Air Wing 17 (pictured). Between 2–14 May 2013, the Carl Vinson and Carrier Air Wing Seventeen completed their Underway for Tailored Ship's Training Availability (TSTA) pre-deployment exercises.

On 22 March 2012, the cruiser Bunker Hill began its five-month Drydocking Selected Restricted Availability (DSRA) overhaul at the BAE Systems San Diego Ship Repair facility. The destroyer Gridley began its selected restricted availability (SRA) yard at BAE Systems San Diego Ship Repair facility on 26 June 2013. Gridley began its sea trials on 7 October 2013. On 17 November 2013, the destroyer Higgins began its five-month Selected Restricted Availability (SRA) upkeep. The frigate McClusky completed its three-month Selected Restricted Availability (SRA) upkeep in January 2013.

On 21 February 2013, Rear Admiral David F. Steindl relieved Rear Admiral Thomas K. Shannon as commander, Carrier Strike Group One in ceremonies held aboard the group's flagship, the Vinson. A surface warfare officer, Steindl had commanded Destroyer Squadron Seven while Shannon takes command of the Military Sealift Command. On 28 January 2014, Admiral Steindl was relieved by Read Admiral Christopher Grady. While in command, Steindl oversaw the strike group's carrier qualifications that produced more than 1,612 sorties, 1,827 arrested landings, and 2,471 flight hours. A surface warfare officer, Admiral Grady commanded Destroyer Squadron 22 during its deployment to the U.S. Fifth Fleet with Carrier Strike Group Two.

On 25 July 2013, the frigate Rentz began its final deployment prior to its decommissioning in 2014 (pictured). The frigate McClusky participated in a Task Group Exercise (TGEX) with the U.S. and Canadian warships between 7–11 October 2013. The destroyer Stockdale completed an extended 10-month deployment to the middle East on 8 November 2013.

At the start of 2014, Carrier Strike Group One was in port and not underway. On 16 January 2014, USS Carl Vinson departed Naval Air Station North Island, California, to begin its Tailored Ship's Training Availability (TSTA) pre-deployment exercise with the Carrier Air Wing 17 and the rest of Carrier Strike Group One. These TSTA training drills and associated real-world scenarios emphasized damage control, flight deck operations, and simulated combat for the units of the carrier strike group, with each training phase evaluated by Afloat Training Group Pacific. Following the TSTA drills, Carrier Strike Group One began its Final Evaluation Problem (FEP) drill. While underway, the strike group flew 1,609 air sorties, including 761 at night (pictured), earning certification from Commander, Naval Air Forces Pacific to continue to the next phase of its training. On 10 February 2014, Carrier Strike Group One returned to Naval Air Station North Island, California, completing the TSTA/FEP phase of its pre-deployment exercises.

On 21 March 2014, Carrier Strike Group One completed its three-week-long Fleet Synthetic Training-Joint Exercise. Such exercises allow carrier strike groups to train with other branches of the U.S. military while the ships are in port by connecting to a U.S. Third Fleet simulation gaming network under the supervision of Tactical Training Group Pacific (TTGP) based at Naval Base Point Loma, California. On 2 June 2014, the carrier strike group successfully completed its Composite Training Unit Exercise (COMPTUEX) off the coast of Southern California. These exercise evaluated the strike group's ability to react to live-training scenarios as an integral unit throughout every phase of naval warfare including sub-surface, surface, and air scenarios. COMPTUEX is the capstone of the integrated training phase for Carrier Strike Group One, and it required the entire strike group to defeat simulated adversaries across the full spectrum of naval warfare.

On 9 June 2014, the strike group successfully completed its Joint Task Force Exercise (JTFEX) off the southern coast of California. JTFEX is an integrated battle force exercise designed to test the capabilities of carrier strike groups operating within a joint environment. It represented culmination of months of training for Carrier Strike Group One in preparation for its upcoming overseas deployment later in this summer.

=== 2014–2015 deployment ===
On 22 August 2014, Carrier Strike Group One departed on its 2014–2015 deployment to the U.S. Seventh Fleet in the western Pacific Ocean and the U.S. Fifth Fleet in the Indian Ocean. The strike group completed an Undersea Warfare Exercise (USWEX) on 3 September 2014. Task Forces 32 (Third Fleet maritime patrol and reconnaissance aircraft) and Task Force 34 (theater-wide anti-submarine warfare force) took part in the exercise, along with units from Australia and Canada. On 9 September 2014, Carrier Strike Group One entered the U.S. Seventh Fleet's area of responsibility.

On 12 September 2014, two F/A-18C Hornet single-seat strike fighters collided and crashed approximately 250 nautical miles (460 km; 290 mi) west of Wake Island. One aircraft was from squadron VFA-94 and the other was from squadron VFA-113. Both squadrons were based at Naval Air Station Lemoore, California, and both squadrons were part of Carrier Air Wing Seventeen embarked aboard Carl Vinson. One aviator was recovered in fair condition and received medical treatment aboard the Carl Vinson. Search-and-rescue (SAR) operations continued for the other aviator (pictured). The strike group was participating in Exercise Valiant Shield 2014 at the time of the mid-air collision. The search was called off on 14 September 2014, and the missing aviator was declared missing and presumed dead, with the crash incident under investigation.

Following a port visit to Singapore, Carrier Strike Group One entered the U.S. Fifth Fleet's area of responsibility on 15 October 2014. On 19 October 2014, Carrier Strike Group One began flying air combat missions in support of Operation Inherent Resolve, the U.S.-led air campaign against ISIL in Iraq and Syria (pictured). On 15 February 2015, the French Navy's Task Force 473, led by the nuclear aircraft carrier Charles de Gaulle, transited the Strait of Hormuz, joining Carrier Strike Group One in the Persian Gulf. Both carrier task groups began operating together (pictured), flying over 100 sorties per day. Charles De Gaulle's Super-Etendard and Rafale fighter jet aircraft flew 15 sorties per day while Carl Vinson's aircraft flies up to 25 combat sorties a day. The rest of the sorties flown were high-end training flights. On 13 April 2015, Carrier Strike Group Twelve relieved Carrier Strike Group One as Task Group 50 in the Gulf of Oman. In support of Operation Inherent Resolve, the strike group flew 12,300 sorties, including 2,383 combat missions; landed more than 9,220 aircraft; and dropped 869 precision guided munitions for a total of more than 500,000 lb (230,000 kg) of ordnance delivered on target.

On 27 March 2015, the USS Sterret took part in the air-sea rescue that successfully recovered the pilots of two F-15 fighter jet that may have been part of Operation Decisive Storm, the Saudi Arabian-led multilateral air campaign against Houthis forces in Yemen. On 1 April 2015, the Sterret carried out a boarding of the Panamanian-flagged merchant ship Saisaban in support of the U.N.-authorized arms embargo against Houthi forces in Yemen.

On 16 April 2015, Carrier Strike Group One departed the U.S. Fifth Fleet, completing its six-month deployment. The strike group departed the U.S. Seventh Fleet on 23 May 2015. After Carrier Strike Group paid its final 2015 port call at Naval Station Pearl Harbor, a MH-60S Seahawk helicopter from squadron HS-15 rendered assistance to a mariner, who had been alone at sea for more than 30 days aboard his 35-foot sailboat, in the Pacific Ocean more than 400 nautical miles (740 km; 460 mi) off the coast of Honolulu on 31 May 2015. On 4 June 2015, Carrier Strike Group One arrived back at Naval Base Point Loma, California, concluding its 10-month deployment to the U.S. Fifth and Seventh fleets.

2014–2015 deployment force composition

CARSTRKGRU 1 Warships	Carrier Air Wing Seventeen (CVW-17) squadrons embarked aboard flagship USS Carl Vinson (CVN-70)	
USS Bunker Hill (CG-52)	Strike Fighter Squadron 113 (VFA-113): 10 F/A-18C (Note: Original number, with operational loss of F/A-18C on 12 September 2014.)	Carrier Airborne Early Warning Squadron 116 (VAW-116): 4 E-2C
USS Dewey (DDG-105)	Strike Fighter Squadron 94 (VFA-94): 10 F/A-18C	Helicopter Maritime Strike Squadron 73 (HSM-73): 11 MH-60R
USS Sterett (DDG-104)	Strike Fighter Squadron 81 (VFA-81): 12 F/A-18E	Helicopter Anti-Submarine Squadron 15 (HS-15): 7 MH-60S
USS Gridley (DDG-101)	Strike Fighter Squadron 22 (VFA-22): 12 F/A-18F	Fleet Logistics Support Squadron 30 (VRC-30): 2 C-2A
EOD Mobile Unit 3	Electronic Attack Squadron 139 (VAQ-139): 5 EA-18G	——

2014–2015 deployment operations, exercises, and port visits

Number	Operations/Regional Exercises				Port Visits		Notes
Number	Duration	U.S. Force	Joint/Bilateral/Multilateral Partner(s)	Operating Area	Location	Dates	Notes
1st:	31 Aug – 3 September 2014	Carrier Strike Group One	Undersea Warfare Exercise (USWEX): CTF-32/34	Mid-Pacific Ocean	—	—	
2nd:	15–23 Sep 2014	Carrier Strike Group One	Valiant Shield 2014: PACOM	Marianas Islands	Singapore	2–7 Oct 2014	
3rd:	(Note: 19 Oct 2014 to 13 April 2015)	Carrier Strike Group One	Operation Inherent Resolve: CENTCOM	Arabian Sea	Jebel Ali, UAE	(Note: 14–18 November 2014, 21–26 February 2015, and 2–12 April 2015 for USS Carl Vinson; 19–23 November 2014 and 14–18 January 2015 for USS Sterett; 14–18 November 2014, 21–26 February 2015, and 2–12 April 2015 for USS Bunker Hill; 8–12 April 2015 for USS Dewey.)	
4th:	8–10 Nov 2014	Dewey, Gridley	IMCMEX 2014: Various (Note: USS Dewey with Yemeni Coast Guard patrol vessel Sana'a. USS Gridley with HMS Bulwark.)	Gulf of Aden	Duqm, Oman (Note: USS Dewey only.)	24 October 2014	
5th:	11 December 2014	Sterett	People's Liberation Army Navy of China (Note: Frigate Yun Chang (FFG 571) and the fleet oiler and Chao Hu (AOR 890))	Gulf of Aden	Manama, Bahrain	29 Nov to 3 December 2014	
6th:	—	Gridley	—	—	Muscat, Oman	5–9 Dec 2014	
7th:	13 December 2014	Dewey	USS Boise (SSN-764)	Suez Canal	Salalah, Oman	29 Nov to 3 December 2014	
8th:	Jan. to Feb. 2015	Dewey	Combined Task Force 150	(Note: North Arabian Sea and Gulf of Oman)	Manama, Bahrain	10 January 2015	
9th:	—	Carl Vinson	—	—	Manama, Bahrain	19–24 May 2015	
10th:	—	Gridley	—	—	Manama, Bahrain	27–31 Jan 2015	
11th:	—	Dewey, Sterett,	—	—	Phuket, Thailand	22 April 2015	
11th:	10 May 2015	Carrier Strike Group One	Malaysian Armed Forces	South China Sea	Fremantle, Australia	26 April 2015	

=== 2017 deployment ===
In mid February 2017, it was reported that Carrier Strike Group 1, including the Carl Vinson, USS Lake Champlain, USS Wayne E. Meyer, and USS Michael Murphy, started what the Navy called "routine operations" in the South China Sea. During the first half of April 2017, the strike group was reportedly ordered towards the Korean Peninsula amid growing concerns about North Korea's ballistic missile program. It had recently conducted training exercises with the ROK Navy in the Western Pacific. The Carl Vinson and its escorts were 3,500 miles (5,600 km) away however, undertaking joint exercises with the Royal Australian Navy in the Indian Ocean south off Singapore. Confusion appeared to stem from a "glitch-ridden sequence of events" that included a premature announcement of the deployment from the Navy. In late April, the Strike Group was joined by two Japan Maritime Self-Defense Force destroyers; the JDS Ashigara and the JS Samidare as they transited the Philippine Sea en route to the Korean peninsula.

In early May, the JMSDF vessels left the Strike Group and were replaced by the USS Stethem and two Republic of Korea Navy destroyers, the ROKS Sejong the Great and ROKS Yang Manchun. Later that month, the Strike Group was joined by the USS Ronald Reagan which had just completed a period of Selected Restricted Availability maintenance. In early June, the USS Ronald Reagan's Carrier Strike Group 5 joined CSG 1 in the Sea of Japan, along with the JMSDF vessels Ashigara and JDS Hyūga.

== Group commanders ==
Commander, Carrier Strike Group One reports to Commander, U.S. Third Fleet, which also supervises its pre-deployment training and certification that includes Composite Unit Training Exercises. When deployed overseas, the strike group comes under the command of the numbered fleet in whose area it is operating (Third, Fourth, Fifth, Sixth, or Seventh Fleets). When deployed in this fashion, the group utilizes a task force or task group designator, for example, Task Group 50.1 in the Fifth Fleet area.

Group commanders since 2009 have included:

• Rear Admiral Ted N. Branch	(1 October 2009 – 26 October 2010)
• Rear Admiral Samuel Perez, Jr.	(26 October 2010 – 18 November 2011)
• Rear Admiral Thomas K. Shannon	(18 November 2011 – 21 February 2013)
• Rear Admiral David F. Steindl	(21 February 2013 – 28 January 2014)
• Rear Admiral Christopher W. Grady	(28 January 2014 – 17 July 2015)
• Rear Admiral James T. Loeblein	(17 July 2015 – 8 August 2016)
• Rear Admiral James Kilby	(8 August 2016 – 28 July 2017)
• Rear Admiral John V. Fuller	(28 July 2017 – 12 June 2018)
• Rear Admiral Alvin Holsey	(12 June 2018 – 25 June 2020)
• Rear Admiral Timothy J. Kott	(25 June 2020 – 28 May 2021)
• Rear Admiral Daniel P. Martin	(28 May 2021 - 3 May 2022)
• Rear Admiral Carlos A. Sardiello	(3 May 2022 - 6 June 2024)
• Rear Admiral Michael S. Wosje	(6 June 2024 - 24 April 2025)
• Rear Admiral Amy Bauernschmidt	(24 April 2025 - 31 October 2025)
• Rear Admiral Jay Clark	(5 February 2026 - present)

== See also ==
- History of the United States Navy
- List of United States Navy aircraft squadrons

== Notes ==
Footnotes

Citations

== Sources ==
- Morison, Samuel Loring (May 2009). "U.S. Naval Battle Force Changes 1 January 2008 – 31 December 2008: Aircraft Carrier Air Wing Assignments and Composition as of 17 Feb 2009". Naval Institute Proceedings. 135 (5): 118–120. ISSN 0041-798X. "Registration required."
- —— (May 2010). "U.S. Naval Battle Force Changes 1 January 2009 – 31 December 2009: Aircraft Carrier Air Wing Assignments and Composition as of 1 March 2010". Naval Institute Proceedings. 136 (5): 106–116. ISSN 0041-798X. "Registration required."
- —— (May 2011). "U.S. Naval Battle Force Changes 1 January 2010 – 31 December 2010: Aircraft Carrier Air Wing Assignments and Composition as of 1 March 2011". Naval Institute Proceedings. 137 (5): 117–120. ISSN 0041-798X. "Registration required."
- —— (May 2012). "U.S. Naval Battle Force Changes 1 January 2011 – 31 December 2011: Aircraft Carrier Air Wing Assignments and Composition as of 2 April 2012". Naval Institute Proceedings. 138 (5): 113. ISSN 0041-798X. "Registration required."
- —— (September 2014). "U.S. Battle Force Aviation Changes 2013–14". Naval Institute Proceedings. 140 (9): 48–50. ISSN 0041-798X. "Registration required; downloadable PDF file covering 2013 and 2014."
