= Samuel Pérez (pianist) =

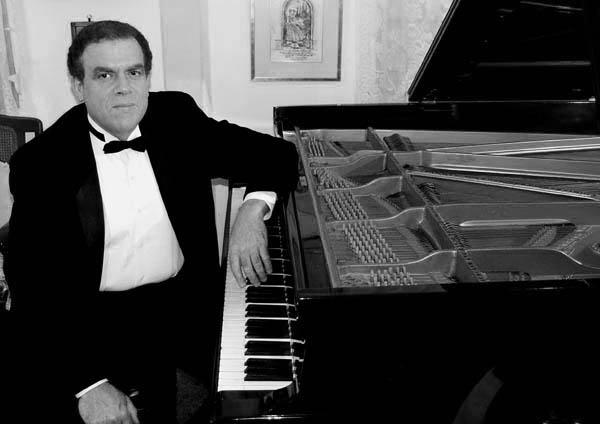
Samuel Perez

Samuel Pérez Quiñones C. A., November 29, 1952 in San Juan, Puerto Rico, DMA is a Puerto Rican pianist with a doctorate in music arts in applied music (piano) from the University of Michigan. He is a faculty member of the Music Department of the University of Puerto Rico, Rio Piedras Campus. Perez has given performances throughout Europe and the United States.

In 2003 he conducted a series of six concerts in Germany and Austria, including a piano concerto in Himmelkron Castle in Bayreuth. In Austria he was soloist for the St. Oswald-Moderbrugg band and also interpreted pieces by Mozart, Albéniz, Liszt and Rachmaninoff.
