= USS Bunker Hill (CG-52) =

US Navy Ticonderoga-class cruiser

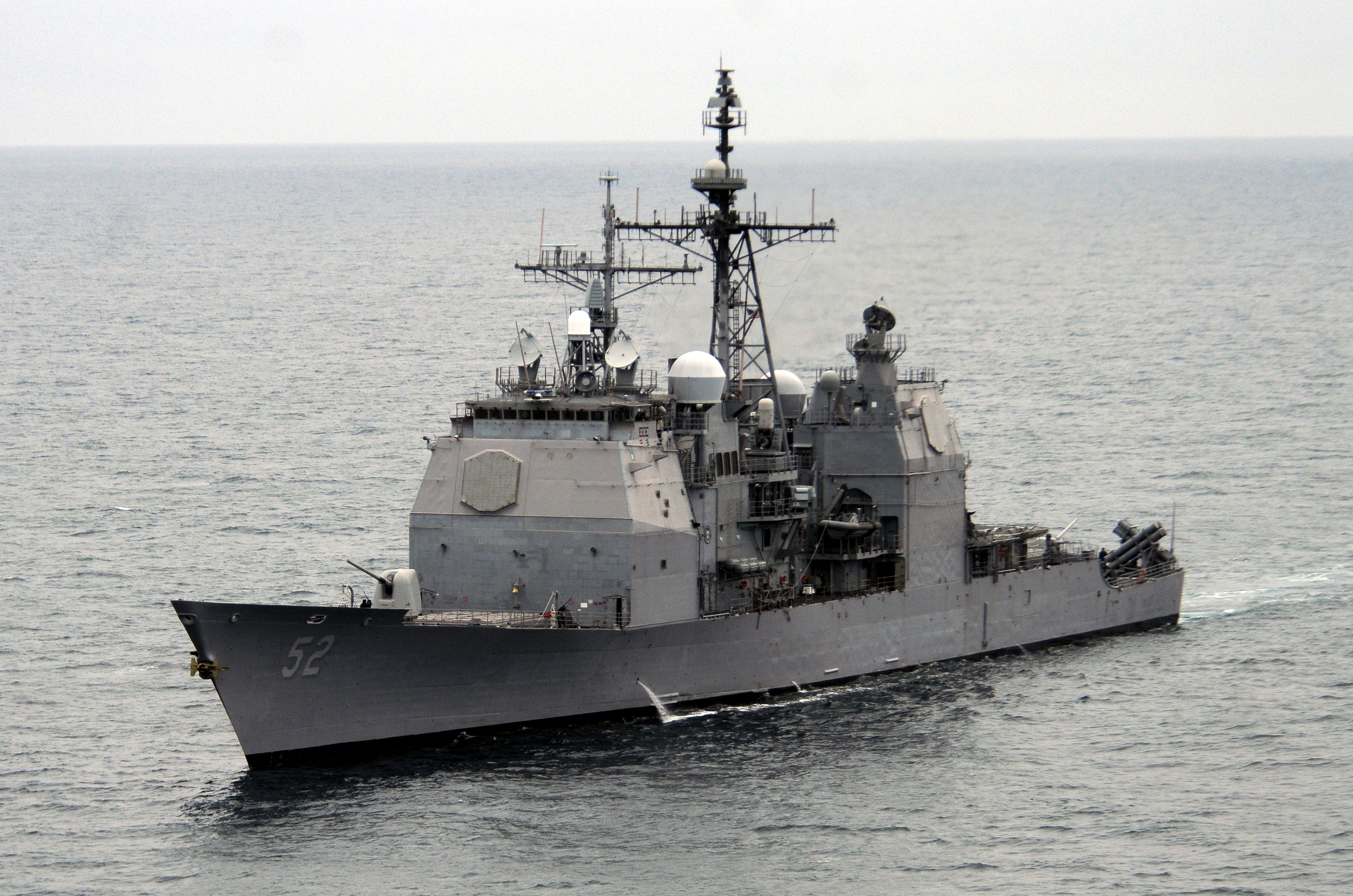
- USS Bunker Hill in 2011

History

United States
- Name: Bunker Hill
- Namesake: Battle of Bunker Hill
- Ordered: 15 January 1982
- Builder: Ingalls Shipbuilding
- Laid down: 11 January 1984
- Launched: 11 March 1985
- Commissioned: 20 September 1986
- Decommissioned: 29 September 2023
- Stricken: 29 September 2023
- Identification: Call sign: NNBH; Hull number: CG-52
- Motto: Sword of the fleet
- Nickname(s): Bravo
- Honors and awards: 7 Battle "E" Awards
- Status: Stricken, Final Disposition Pending
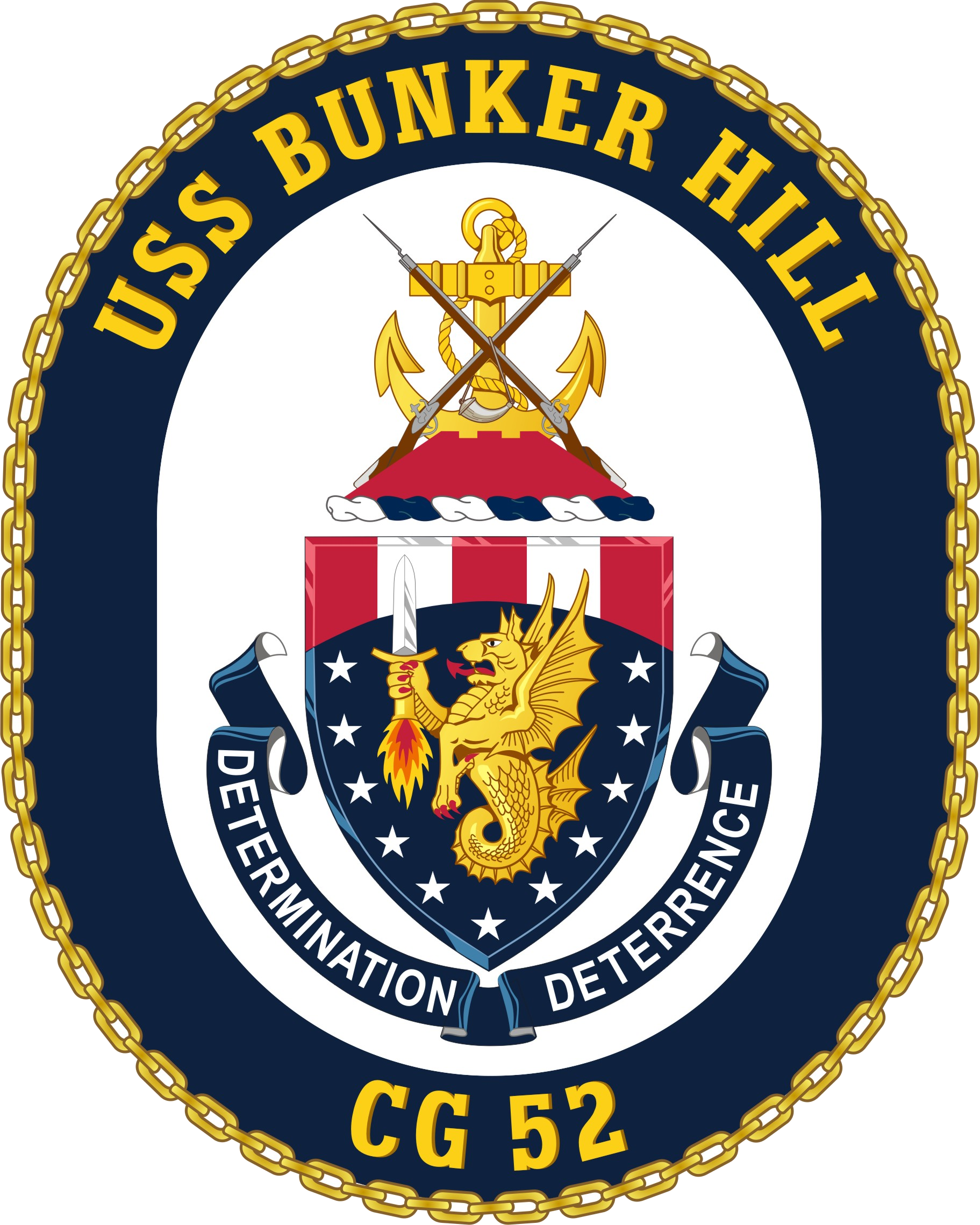
- Badge

General characteristics
- Class & type: Ticonderoga-class cruiser
- Displacement: Approx. 9,600 long tons (9,800 t) full load
- Length: 567 feet (173 m)
- Beam: 55 feet (16.8 meters)
- Draft: 34 feet (10.2 meters)
- Propulsion: 4 × General Electric LM2500 gas turbine engines; 2 × controllable-reversible pitch propellers; 2 × rudders
- Speed: 32.5 knots (60 km/h; 37.4 mph)
- Range: 6,000 nmi (11,000 km) at 20 kn (37 km/h); 3,300 nmi (6,100 km) at 30 kn (56 km/h).
- Complement: 30 officers and 300 enlisted
- Sensors & processing systems: AN/SPY-1A/B multi-function radar; AN/SPS-49 air search radar (Removed on some ships); AN/SPG-62 fire control radar; AN/SPS-73 surface search radar; AN/SPQ-9 gun fire control radar; AN/SQQ-89(V)1/3 - A(V)15 Sonar suite, consisting of: AN/SQS-53B/C/D active sonar; AN/SQR-19 TACTAS, AN/SQR-19B ITASS, & MFTA passive sonar; AN/SQQ-28 light airborne multi-purpose system
- Armament: 2 × 61 cell Mk 41 vertical launch systems containing; 122 × mix of: RIM-66M-5 Standard SM-2MR Block IIIB; RIM-156A SM-2ER Block IV; RIM-161 SM-3; RIM-162A ESSM; RIM-174A Standard ERAM; BGM-109 Tomahawk; RUM-139A VL-ASROC; 8 × RGM-84 Harpoon missiles; 2 × 5 in (127 mm)/62 caliber Mark 45 Mod 4 lightweight gun; 2 × Mk 38 25 mm Machine Gun Systems; 2–4 × .50 in (12.7 mm) cal. machine gun; 2 × Phalanx CIWS Block 1B; 2 × Mk 32 12.75 in (324 mm) triple torpedo tubes
- Aircraft carried: 2 × MH-60R Seahawk LAMPS Mk III helicopters.
- Aviation facilities: Hangar bay, flight deck

USS Bunker Hill (CG-52) is a decommissioned Ticonderoga-class guided missile cruiser of the United States Navy constructed by Litton-Ingalls Shipbuilding Corporation at Pascagoula, Mississippi and launched on 11 March 1985. The Ticonderoga-class cruisers are equipped with the Aegis Combat System and Bunker Hill was the first of the class to be equipped with the Mark 41 Vertical Launching System (VLS) in place of the previous ships' twin-arm Mark 26 missile launchers, which greatly improved the flexibility and firepower of the ships by allowing them to fire BGM-109 Tomahawk cruise missiles for land attack missions. Other missions include ballistic missile defence and capital ship escort for anti-aircraft defense. The ship was commissioned on 20 September 1986 and was homeported at Naval Base San Diego in San Diego, California.

Bunker Hill saw service in the Persian Gulf during the Gulf War and deployed off the Somalian coast to prevent piracy. The cruiser had forward deployed to Yokosuka, Japan and performed missions in the Pacific, including monitoring missions during the Third Taiwan Strait Crisis.

Bunker Hill was decommissioned on 22 September 2023 at Naval Base San Diego.

== Service history ==
=== 1980s ===
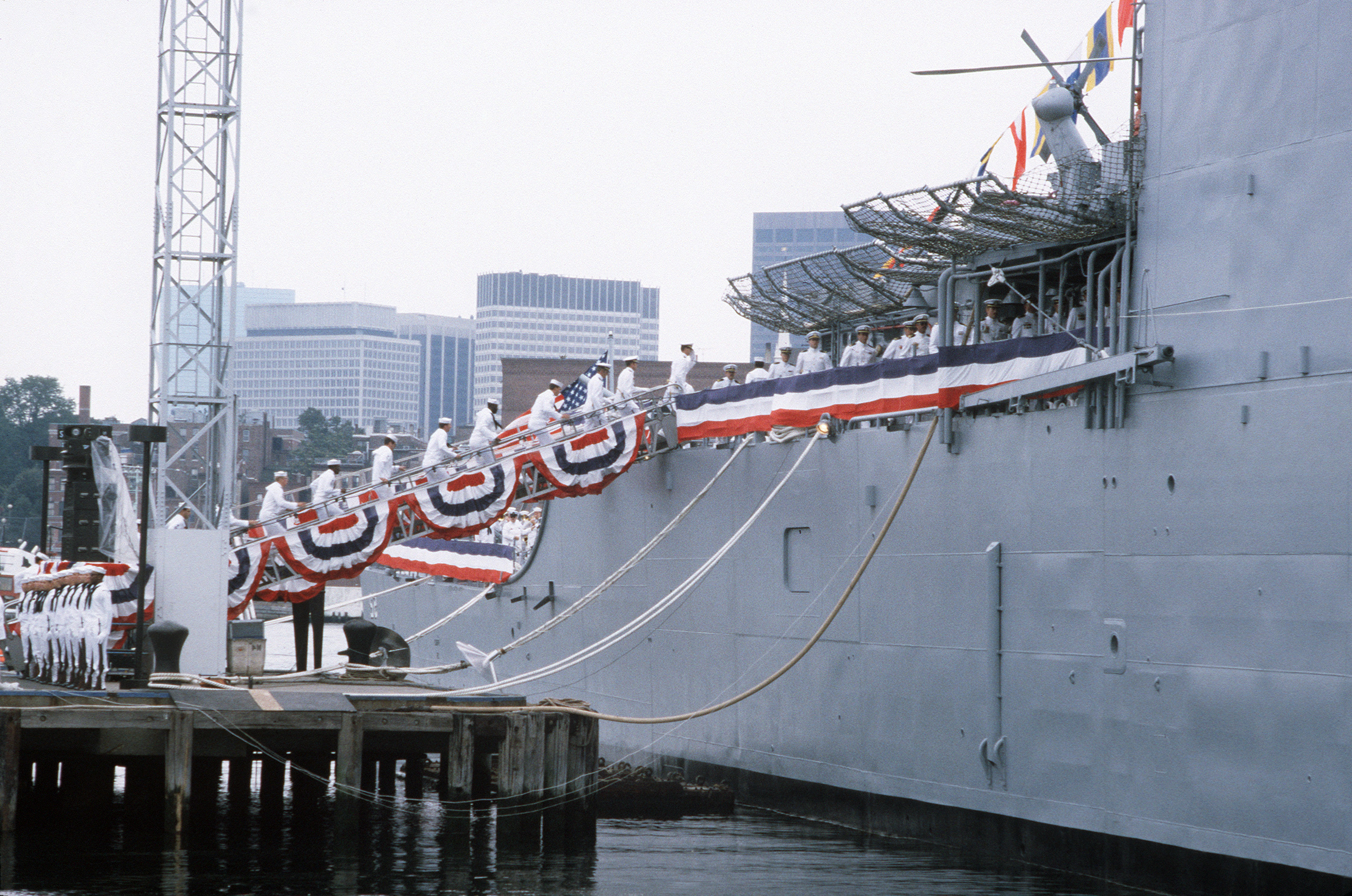
Crew members manning the ship during Bunker Hill's commissioning ceremony

After commissioning in Charlestown, Massachusetts, Bunker Hill entered the Pacific Ocean via the Panama Canal and began short notice work-ups to deploy to the U.S. Seventh Fleet. She made her first deployment in July 1987, nearly one year ahead of schedule.

During READIEX 87-5, Bunker Hill first operated with Battle Group Sierra which consisted of Commander, Cruiser-Destroyer Group 1, the battleship Missouri, cruiser Long Beach, destroyer Hoel, frigate Curts, and supply vessel Kansas City. She deployed as part of Battle Group Sierra (Task Group 30.7). Following an upkeep period at Subic Bay in the Philippines, Bunker Hill became Anti-Air Warfare Coordinator for Battle Group Sierra (TG 70.10), now en route to the North Arabian Sea and Gulf of Oman. During the deployment she provided an anti-air warfare umbrella inside the Persian Gulf for Missouri and other US-flagged tankers and ships transiting through the Strait of Hormuz.

In August 1988, Bunker Hill's homeport was shifted from San Diego to Yokosuka, Japan joining the Midway Carrier Battle Group. She then deployed with the Midway group for four months with the Seventh Fleet, for which she was awarded the Meritorious Unit Commendation. She was also awarded her first Battle Efficiency Award.

=== 1990s ===
In November 1990, Bunker Hill sailed in support of Operation Desert Shield and Operation Desert Storm and served as the multinational Air Warfare Commander (AAWC) and as one of the first ships to launch a Tomahawk Land Attack Cruise Missile against Iraqi targets. Following the conclusion of the Persian Gulf War, Bunker Hill participated in organizing and establishing Operation Southern Watch, the complex enforcement of the United Nations-established no-fly zone over southern Iraq. Bunker Hill made a historical visit to the Russian city Vladivostok in 1993, and then in 1995 she made a port visit to Qingdao in the People's Republic of China.

In March 1996, during the Third Taiwan Strait Crisis, she took station south of Taiwan to monitor missile tests by the People's Liberation Army.

In July 1998, Bunker Hill's homeport was shifted from Yokosuka, Japan back to San Diego.

=== 2000s ===
In late 2000, Bunker Hill deployed with the Abraham Lincoln Battle Group. She again participated in Operation Southern Watch and conducted boardings and inspections of over 40 merchant vessels in support of United Nations sanctions against Iraq. Bunker Hill also escorted the Tarawa Amphibious Ready Group (ARG) while conducting humanitarian operations off East Timor and training exercises in Kuwait. Bunker Hill acted as Air Defense Commander for the ARG where she designed and implemented innovative procedures for CG integration into an ARG. Following the attack on the destroyer USS Cole, Bunker Hill sortied from Bahrain to provide support and protection to seven United States Navy and United States Naval Ships (auxiliary vessels) based there and subsequently remained at sea for 67 consecutive days. Bunker Hill returned from deployment in February 2001.

Since her commissioning, Bunker Hill has deployed six times to the Persian Gulf and has earned fifteen Battle "E" Awards, including the Golden Battle "E" in 1996 and 2006 which is given when a ship receives five such awards consecutively.

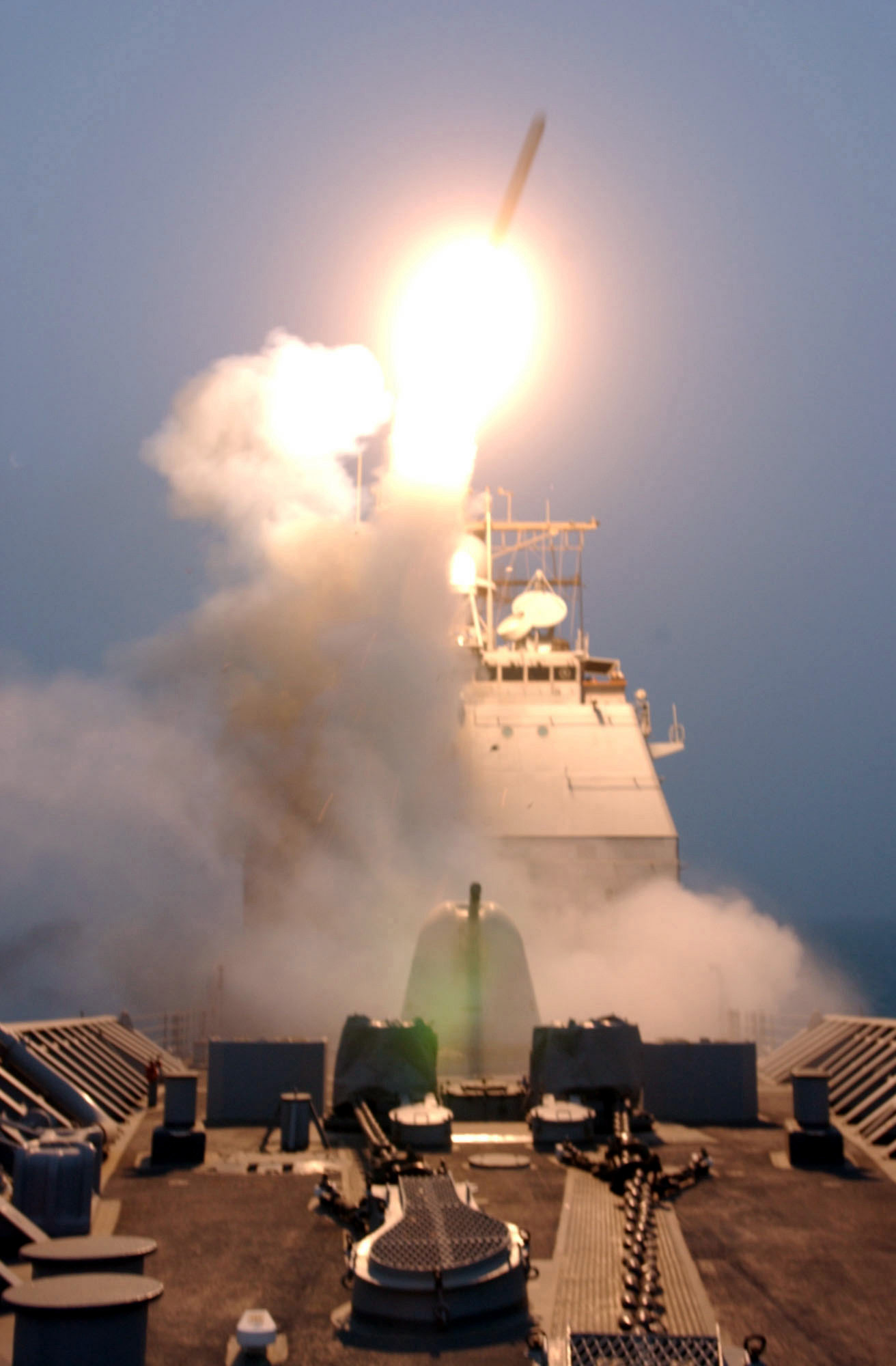
Bunker Hill firing a Tomahawk cruise missile during the Iraq War

In March 2003, Bunker Hill was assigned to Cruiser-Destroyer Group 3. Bunker Hill went on to fire a total of 31 Tomahawk missiles in support of Operation Iraqi Freedom.

In December 2004 Bunker Hill left San Diego again under the command of ESG-5 for a deployment to the Middle East. In December 2004 the ship detoured to the coast of Banda Aceh to provide humanitarian assistance to the Indonesian province as one of the first responders to the earthquake and subsequent tsunami which destroyed the coastal regions of the province. After completing its humanitarian aid mission in Indonesia, Bunker Hill proceeded to the Fifth Fleet area of responsibility. After checking into CTF-150, and while off the coast of Oman, the ship deployed one of its helicopters on 31 January 2005 to medevac a Japanese mariner with a life-threatening illness from MV Apollo Sun to Seeb International Airport near Muscat, Oman. The ship returned from deployment to its home port in San Diego in May 2005.

In March 2006, it was announced that Lockheed Martin would upgrade the Aegis Combat System on 22 navy vessels; Bunker Hill was the first slated to receive the upgrade. In January 2007, Bunker Hill was sent to the coast of Somalia to conduct anti-terrorist operations as part of the Dwight D. Eisenhower task force. She was awarded the Meritorious Unit Citation for this role. On 28 February 2008, Bunker Hill was awarded the 2007 Battle "E" award, her 6th consecutive Battle "E".

From 1 October 2009, Bunker Hill was assigned to Carrier Strike Group One, whose flagship was the aircraft carrier Carl Vinson.

=== 2010s ===
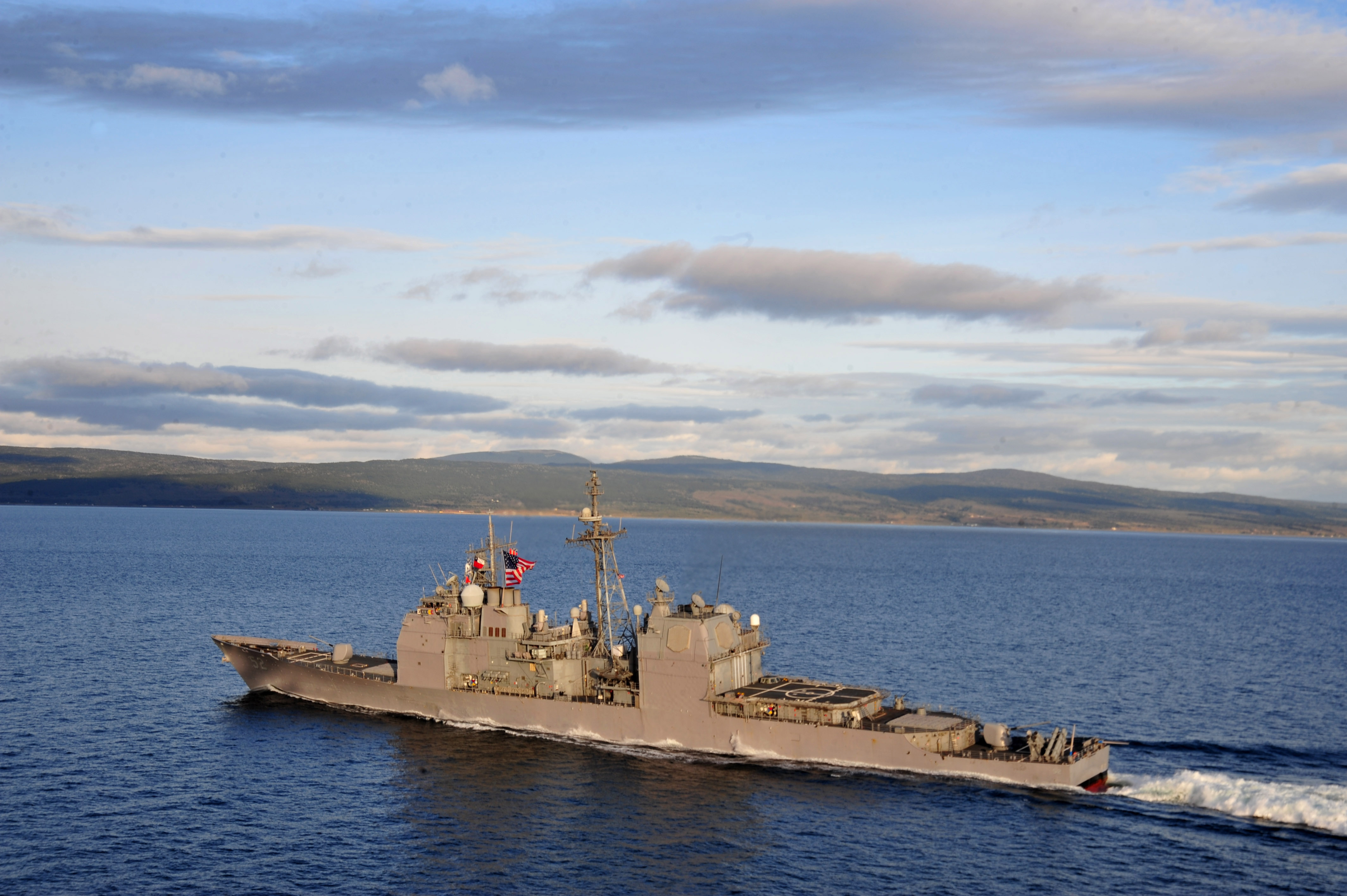
Bunker Hill passing through the Strait of Magellan in March 2010

In January 2010, Bunker Hill sailed for Haiti, part of the US Navy's force providing disaster relief after the 2010 Haiti earthquake.

In February 2011, Bunker Hill along with the destroyer Momsen broke up a pirate attack on a tanker while patrolling the Gulf of Oman. The ships chased away two skiffs, eventually sinking both after they had returned to their mothership.

In 2011–2012 the ship deployed with Carrier Strike Group One. On 22 October 2012, Bunker Hill began a five-month Drydocking Selected Restricted Availability (DSRA) maintenance period at the BAE Systems Inc. shipyard in San Diego, California.

In October 2017, Bunker Hill deployed from San Diego as part of Carrier Strike Group Nine to the Western Pacific Ocean and Persian Gulf.

=== 2020s ===
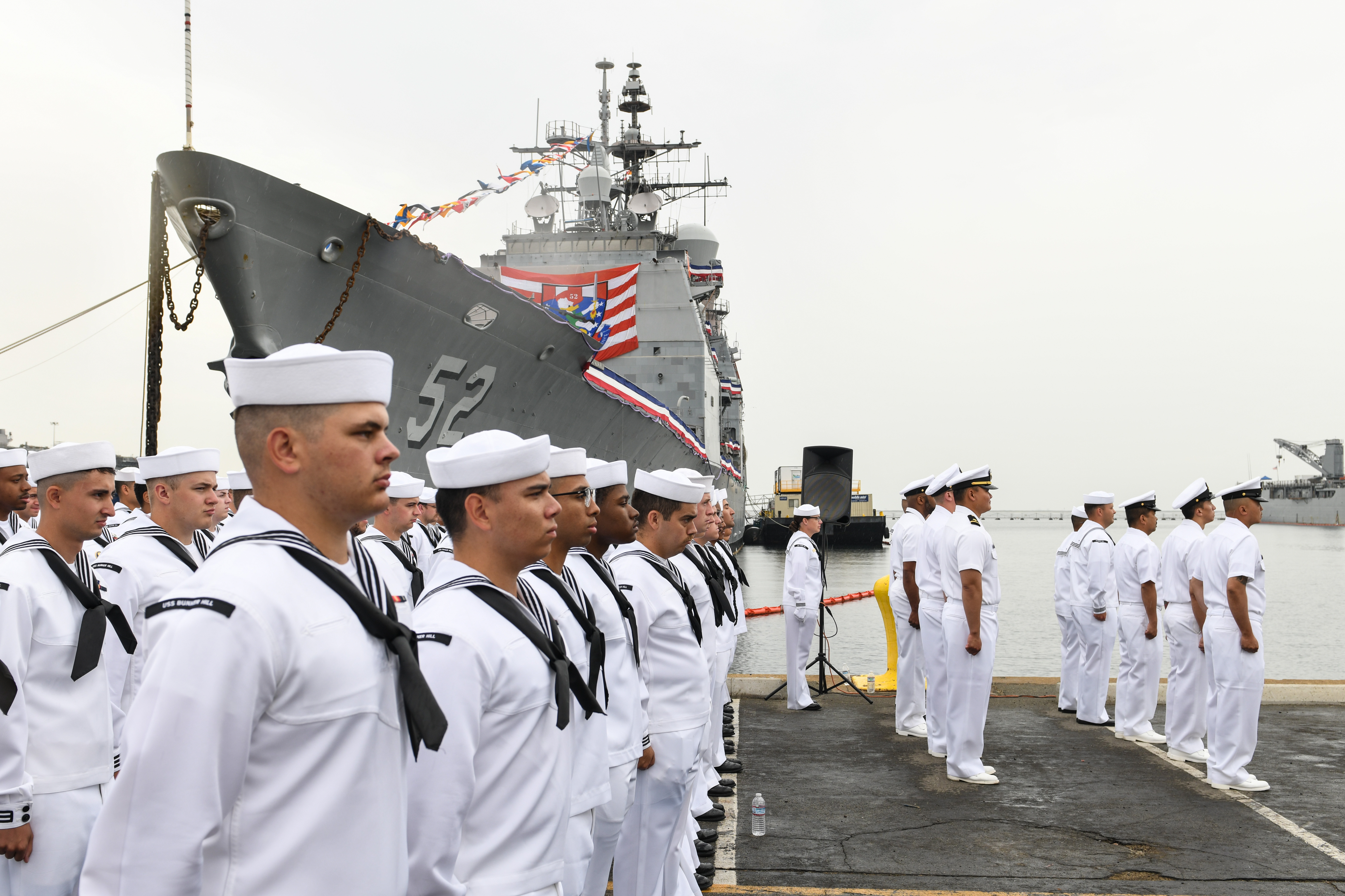
Bunker Hill's crew standing at attention during the ship's decommissioning ceremony

In December 2020 the U.S. Navy's Report to Congress on the Annual Long-Range Plan for Construction of Naval Vessels stated that the ship was planned to be placed out of commission in reserve in 2023. On 22 September 2023, Bunker Hill was decommissioned at Naval Base San Diego.

== Awards ==
- Combat Action Ribbon - (Jan-Feb 1991)
- Navy Unit Commendation - (Jan-Feb 1991, Oct 1997-Apr 1998, Jan-May 2003)
- Navy Meritorious Unit Commendation - (Sep 1988-Dec 1989, May-Sep 1992, Jul 1994-Apr 1996, Jan 1999-Sep 2001, Aug 2000-Jan 2001, Oct 2006-May 2007, Nov 2011-May 2012)
- Battle "E" - (1987, 1992, 1993, 1994, 1995, 1996, 1997, 2000, 2002, 2003, 2004, 2005, 2006, 2007, 2008, 2015, 2016, 2017)
- Southwest Asia Service Medal - (Oct – Mar 1991) and (Aug - Oct 1995)
- Humanitarian Service Medal - (Dec 2004 – Feb 2005, Jan – Feb 2010)
- Coast Guard Unit Commendation - (31 Jan – 2 Feb 2000)

== Notable appearances in media ==
- The USS Bunker Hill is a unlockable ship in the mobile version of War Thunder and was released in the “Dark Waters” update.
