= Samuel Perez Jr. =

United States admiral (born 1958)

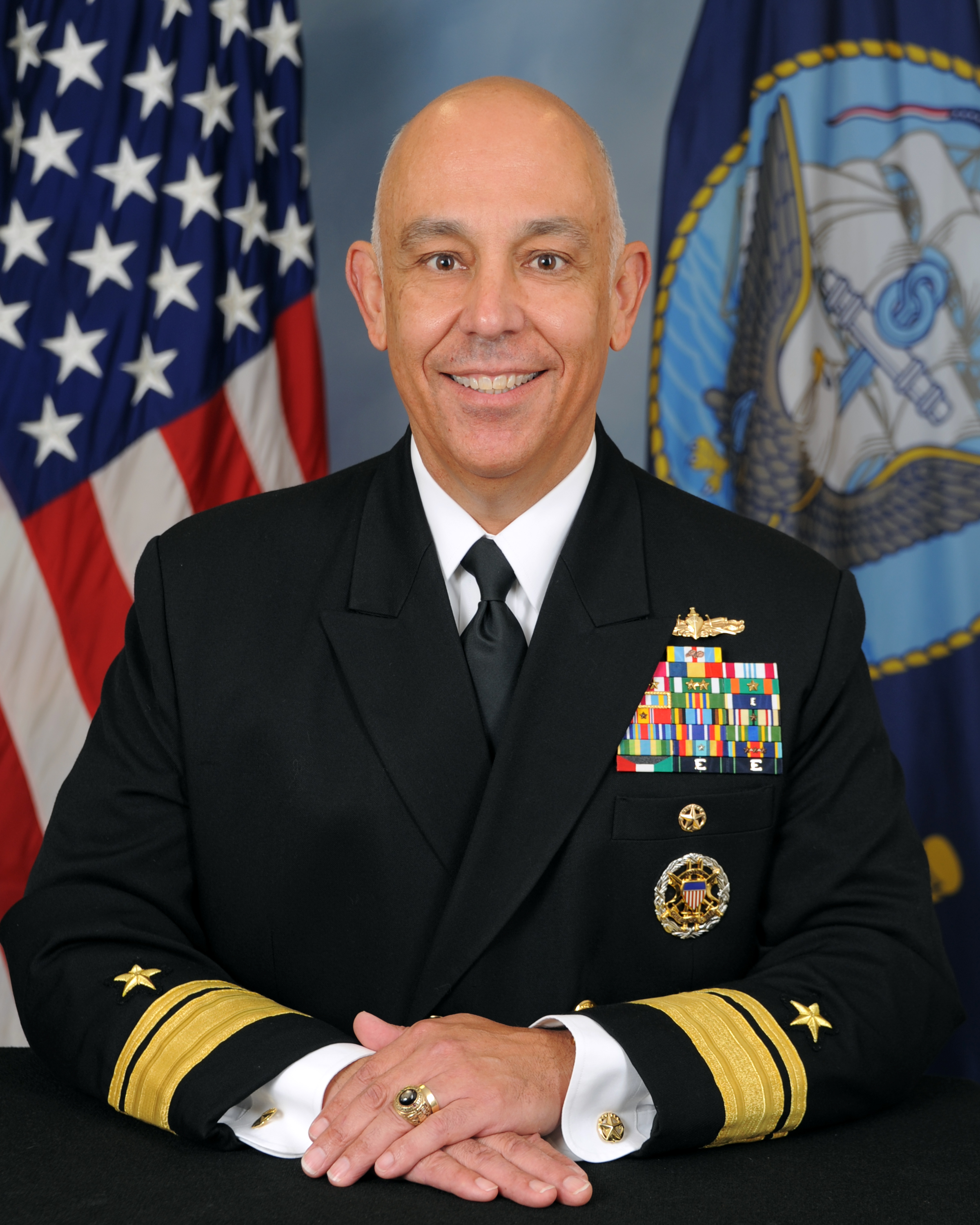
- Rear Admiral Samuel Perez
- Born: April 2, 1958 (age 68); El Paso, Texas
- Military career
- Allegiance: United States of America
- Branch: United States Navy
- Rank: Rear admiral (upper half)
- Commands: Carrier Strike Group One; Deputy Director, Joint Interagency Task Force South
- Awards: Defense Superior Service Medal; Legion of Merit (2); Navy and Marine Corps Medal; Defense Meritorious Service Medal; Meritorious Service Medal (4); Navy Commendation Medal (2)

Samuel Perez Jr. (born April 2, 1958) is a retired rear admiral in the United States Navy.

Perez, a native of El Paso, Texas, is a 1980 graduate of the United States Naval Academy. He served aboard the USS Paul F. Foster (DD-964), USS Knox (FF-1052) and USS Bunker Hill (CG-52). His at-sea commands include command of USS Reclaimer (ARS-42), command of USS Vincennes (CG-49), command of Destroyer Squadron (DESRON) 15 and command of Carrier Strike Group (CSG) 1. During his tour as commander, CSG-1, he completed a 5th Fleet deployment supporting Operation Enduring Freedom and Operation New Dawn.

== Early life and education ==
Perez was born in El Paso, Texas, in 1958. His father, Samuel Sr., was a Navy veteran of the Korean War. He attended Lone Star Elementary School in Canutillo, Texas, and high school at Cathedral High School in El Paso, Texas. He entered the United States Naval Academy on July 6, 1976 and graduated with the Class of 1980 on May 28, 1980 with a Bachelor of Science degree in political science. He graduated from the Naval Postgraduate School in 1992 with a Master of Arts degree in strategic planning.

== Career ==
Following commissioning in 1980, Perez attended Basic Surface Warfare Officers Training Course in Coronado, California, and then reported aboard USS Paul F. Foster (DD-964). He served as electrical officer and main propulsion assistant. His next tour was as the gas turbine training officer at the Naval Training Center Great Lakes. Following his shore tour at Great Lakes, Illinois, Perez served as the operations officer aboard the USS Knox (FF-1052), homeported out of Yokosuka, Japan. Aboard Knox, Perez deployed to the Central Command Area of Operations and conducted routine patrols in the Sea of Japan and South China Sea. Perez next served as the operations officer aboard USS Bunker Hill (CG-52), homeported out of Yokosuka, Japan. As the air warfare commander for the USS Midway Strike Group, Bunker Hill conducted numerous patrols in the South China Sea, the East China Sea, the Yellow Sea and the Sea of Japan. In addition, USS Bunker Hill deployed to the Central Command Area of Operations with the Midway Battle Group in 1989.

Perez then attended the Naval Postgraduate School in Monterey, California. He graduated with a Master of Arts in strategic planning in 1992. Returning to the fleet in 1993, Perez assumed command of the rescue and salvage ship, USS Reclaimer (ARS-42). Perez decommissioned Reclaimer on September 16, 1994. Perez then reported to the Ballistic Missile Defense Organization (BMDO) as the Navy theater wide action officer. During his tour at BMDO, Perez also served a rotation in the Missile Warfare Division of Under Secretary of Defense for Acquisition, Technology and Logistics. Perez transferred to the Navy Program Executive Office Theater Air Defense (PEO TAD) and served as the Navy theater wide action officer.

Returning to the Seventh Fleet Area of Operations for a third tour, Perez assumed duties as commanding officer, USS Vincennes (CG-49). Vincennes conducted numerous exercises and patrols in the South China Sea, the East China Sea, the Yellow Sea and the Sea of Japan. Vincennes also conducted exercises to develop and refine tactics to counter North Korean Special Operations Forces infiltration operations in the Yellow Sea.

Perez participated in the Federal Executive Fellowship (FEF) Program as a Fellow at the Massachusetts Institute of Technology from August 2000 to August 2001. He focused his Fellowship studies on the technical challenges and political implications and challenges of sea-based Ballistic Missile Defense (BMD). Following his Fellowship tour, Perez reported to the Chief of Naval Operations Staff, Surface Warfare Directorate (N76) as the future ships branch head. As the future ships branch head, Perez oversaw the resourcing and requirements for both LCS and the future DDG 1000 ship programs. Perez was in the Pentagon on September 11, 2001. The Navy awarded Perez the Navy and Marine Corp Medal for Heroism for his actions immediately after the attack.

Perez returned for his fourth tour to the Seventh Fleet Area of Operations as Commander Destroyer Squadron 15. During his tour as the squadron Commodore, Perez served as the Sea Combat Commander for TASK FORCE 70, Headquarters aboard USS Kitty Hawk (CV-63). Perez commanded a seven-ship squadron comprising USS O'Brien (DD-975), USS Cushing (DD-985), USS Curtis Wilbur (DDG-54), USS John S. Mccain (DDG-56), USS Vandegrift (FFG-48), USS Gary (FFG-51), USS Vincennes (CG-49). The squadron conducted routine patrols and exercises in the South China Sea, the East China Sea, the Yellow Sea and the Sea of Japan and deployed to the Central Command Area of Operations for operations in the North Arabian Sea and Gulf of Oman.

Following his Destroyer Squadron Command, Perez was assigned to the Navy's Strategic Studies Group (SSG) in Newport, Rhode Island. As an SSG Fellow, Perez focused his studies on the impacts and technical challenges of advanced unmanned surface, air, and subsurface vehicles in naval warfare. Perez then reported to the Commander Naval Central Command (NAVCENT) Staff as chief of staff. He also served as the deputy Fifth Fleet commander. Following his tour at NAVCENT, Perez reported to the Joint Staff as the assistant director of regional operations on the Joint Chiefs of Staff. He then served as the executive assistant to the assistant to the Chairman, Joint Chiefs of Staff.

For his first flag officer tour, Perez assumed the responsibilities as the deputy director of Joint Interagency Task Force South (JIATFS) in Key West, Florida. As the deputy, Perez led efforts to conduct detection and monitoring (D&M) operations throughout their Joint Operating Area to facilitate the interdiction of illicit trafficking in support of national and partner nation security. Perez coordinated with the interagency and international partners to illuminate transnational organized crime networks and support interdiction and apprehension by U.S. and Partner Nation law enforcement agencies. During his tour at JIATFS, Perez was assigned to Operation Unified Response, the United States' response to the 2010 Haiti earthquake. Perez was tasked to command Joint Task Force Port Opening. He led a team of engineers and logistics experts who first surveyed the damage to the devastated port, cleared the damage so that emergency supplies could be brought in via ships, and finally, reconstructing the port to enable normal port operations.

In 2010 Perez assumed command of Carrier Strike Group One. Headquartered aboard USS Carl Vinson (CVN-70), Carrier Strike Group One deployed to the Asia Pacific region and the Central Command Area of Operations (CENTCOM AOR). In the CENTCOM AOR, Perez assumed command of Carrier Task Force Five Zero, consisting of the Enterprise and Carl Vinson Strike Groups. As the commander of Task Force Five Zero, Perez conducted missions in support of sensitive national tasking, theater security cooperation, intelligence collection, maritime security, and counter-piracy operations. Strike Group One completed 1,650 combat sorties and disrupted 9 piracy events, capturing 30 pirates. USS Carl Vinson and the Strike Group One supported Operation Neptune Spear by overseeing the burial at sea for Osama Bin Laden.

Perez was next assigned as the Director International Engagement on the Chief of Naval Operation's staff. During this tour, the Vice Chief of Naval Operations directed Perez to conduct an assessment and review of the Navy's readiness to receive, employ and deploy the littoral combat ship across the Doctrine, Organization, Training, Materiel, Leadership and Education, Personnel, Facilities (DOTMLPF) spectrum. Perez led a team of civilians and military members who produced an initially unclassified report (the Vice Chief of Naval Operations later directed the report to be classified Secret). The report, subsequently referred to as the "Perez Report" identified issues such as inadequate ship manning, lack of shipboard commonality across the two hull types and lethality and potential warfighting effectiveness.

In December 2012, Perez reported to the State Department, Bureau of Political Military Affairs, as the Deputy Assistant Secretary for Plans Programs and Operations. Perez worked closely to bridge the communication gap between the Departments of State and Defense and the National Security Council. He also managed, and significantly strengthen the United States' global peace operations capacity building efforts, substantially contributing to global conflict resolution activities. He conducted multiple sensitive engagements with foreign governments such as the United Kingdom, Vietnam, Laos, and Cambodia. Perez also oversaw the policy execution on high-profile weapons removal and abatement issues that positively contributed to the reduction of explosive remnants of war and in direct support of the rebalance to the Asia-Pacific.

Rear Admiral Perez's final tour was as the sixty fifth President of the Board and Inspection and Survey. He retired from military service on July 31, 2016.
