= 2011–2012 Strait of Hormuz dispute =

Geopolitical conflict

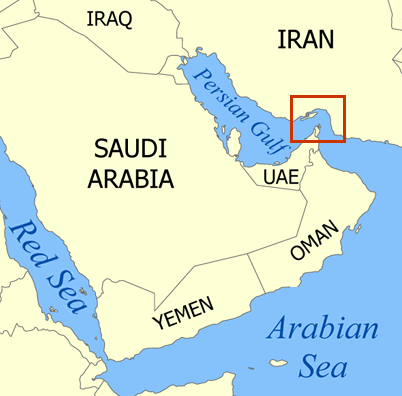
- Strait of Hormuz highlighted by a red box
| Date | 27 December 2011–2012 |
| Location | Strait of Hormuz |
| Result | Vice President Rahimi warns of closing the Strait of Hormuz; Multi-national flotilla established in Persian Gulf and Arabian Sea off coast of Iran; EU sanctions enforced, banning the export of oil from Iran to the EU countries and freezing Iranian assets |

Belligerents
| United States; United Kingdom; France; Australia | Iran |

Units involved
| United States Navy; Royal Navy; French Navy; Royal Australian Navy | Islamic Republic of Iran Navy |

Strength
| 2 aircraft carriers 4 destroyers (3 Arleigh and 1 Daring); 4 Type 23 frigates 2 Ticonderoga class cruisers | 4 frigates |

Casualties and losses
| None | None |

The 2011–12 Strait of Hormuz dispute was a dispute between a coalition of countries and Iran. The dispute arose on 27 December 2011, when Iranian Vice President Mohammad Reza Rahimi warned of closing the Strait of Hormuz.

Subsequently, a number of naval drills and missile tests were carried out by Iran. A coalition of countries responded by sending a flotilla of warships to deter any Iranian attempt to close the Strait of Hormuz and threatened Iran publicly and through letters not to close the Strait.

The dispute was interjected by a European Union sanction banning oil exports from Iran to Europe on 23 January 2012 in an attempt to deter Iran from continuing with their nuclear program. In 2012, oil exports contributed to about 80% of Iranian public revenue, with roughly 20% being exported to Europe. Asian countries such as Japan and South Korea, which taken together account for 26% of Iran's oil exports, have expressed a willingness to reduce oil imports from Iran.

== Background ==
The Strait is situated off the coast of Iran and is a recognized international trade route. The strait is narrowest at 21 nautical miles (39 km) and is recognized as a naval choke point. Oil is a key commodity with approximately 20% of seaborne oil in the world transported via the Strait of Hormuz.

The Strait of Hormuz has been the scene of a stand-off between Iran and the United States before. On 18 April 1988, the U.S. Navy waged a one-day battle against Iranian forces in and around the strait. The battle, dubbed Operation Praying Mantis by the U.S. side, was launched in retaliation for the mining of USS Samuel B. Roberts on 14 April by Iran. U.S. forces sank one Islamic Republic of Iran Navy frigate, one gunboat, and as many as six armed speedboats in the engagement and seriously damaged a second frigate.

On 26 January 2012, The Christian Science Monitor wrote:

Iran's strategy of asymmetric warfare recognizes that, since the 1979 Islamic Revolution, Iran has little chance of winning any face-to-face military contest with powerful enemies like the United States. Instead, Iran aims to "exploit enemy vulnerabilities through the used of 'swarming' tactics by well-armed small boats and fast-attack craft, to mount surprise attacks at unexpected times and places" which will "ultimately destroy technologically superior enemy forces," writes Iranian military expert Fariborz Haghshenass in a 2008 study based on published doctrines of the Islamic Revolutionary Guard Corps (IRGC).

— ' Peterson

Teheran can accomplish its objectives simply by clogging the strait, adds the Monitor. The Monitor also makes reference to Millennium Challenge 2002, a major war game exercise conducted by the United States armed forces in mid-2002, in which Red forces, commanded by retired Marine Corps Lt. General Paul K. Van Riper, used old methods to evade Blue's sophisticated electronic surveillance network, and a significant portion of Blue's navy was "sunk".

== Dispute ==
On 27 December 2011, Iranian Vice President Mohammad Reza Rahimi warned to cut off oil supply from the Strait of Hormuz should economic sanctions limit, or cut off, Iranian oil exports. Also on that date, the U.S. aircraft carrier USS John C. Stennis concluded a four-day port visit to Jebel Ali, United Arab Emirates, and returned to the North Arabian Sea in support of coalition ground operations in Afghanistan via the Strait of Hormuz.

To coincide with this threat, Iran carried out Velayat 90, a 10-day military exercise in international waters near the Strait of Hormuz. The United States countered this exercise with an increased naval presence in and around the Persian Gulf, with the aircraft carrier John C. Stennis pictured by Iranian reconnaissance in the Persian Gulf. A U.S. Fifth Fleet spokesperson said in response that the Fleet was "always ready to counter malevolent actions", whilst Admiral Habibollah Sayari of the Iranian navy claimed that cutting off oil shipments would be "easy". Security analysts in the West were largely unconcerned by Iran's capabilities to disrupt trade in the area.

On 3 January 2012, following the end of Velayat 90, the Iranian Army chief of staff, General Ataollah Salehi, was quoted by the state news agency IRNA as warning the United States to not deploy the John C. Stennis back to the Persian Gulf. General Salehi said the United States had moved an aircraft carrier out of the Gulf because of Iran's naval exercises, and Iran would take action if the ship returned. "Iran will not repeat its warning...the enemy's carrier has been moved to the Gulf of Oman because of our drill. I recommend and emphasize to the American carrier not to return to the Persian Gulf", he said.

On 4 January 2012, Fars News Agency reported that a bill was being prepared for the Iranian Parliament to bar foreign naval vessels from entering the Persian Gulf unless they receive permission from the Iranian navy, with Iranian lawmaker Nader Qazipour noting: "If the military vessels and warships of any country want to pass via the Strait of Hormuz without coordination and permission of Iran’s navy forces, they should be stopped by the Iranian armed forces." Also, Iranian Defense Minister Ahmad Vahidi reiterated that "transnational forces" have no place in the Persian Gulf region.

The U.S. Navy spokesman Commander Bill Speaks responded that deployment of U.S. military assets would continue as has been the custom stating: "The U.S. Navy operates under international maritime conventions to maintain a constant state of high vigilance in order to ensure the continued, safe flow of maritime traffic in waterways critical to global commerce."

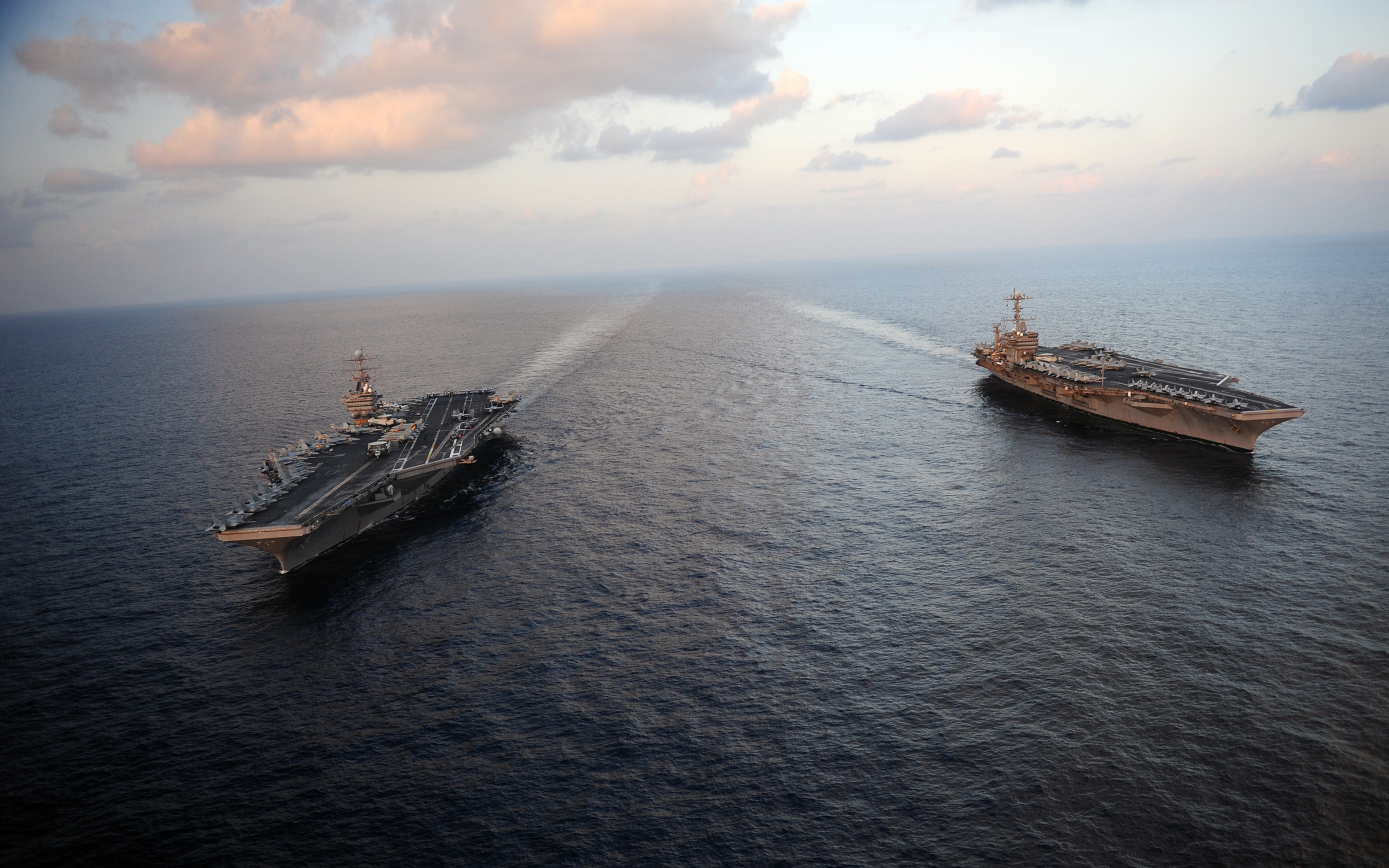
Abraham Lincoln and John C. Stennis (19 January 2012)

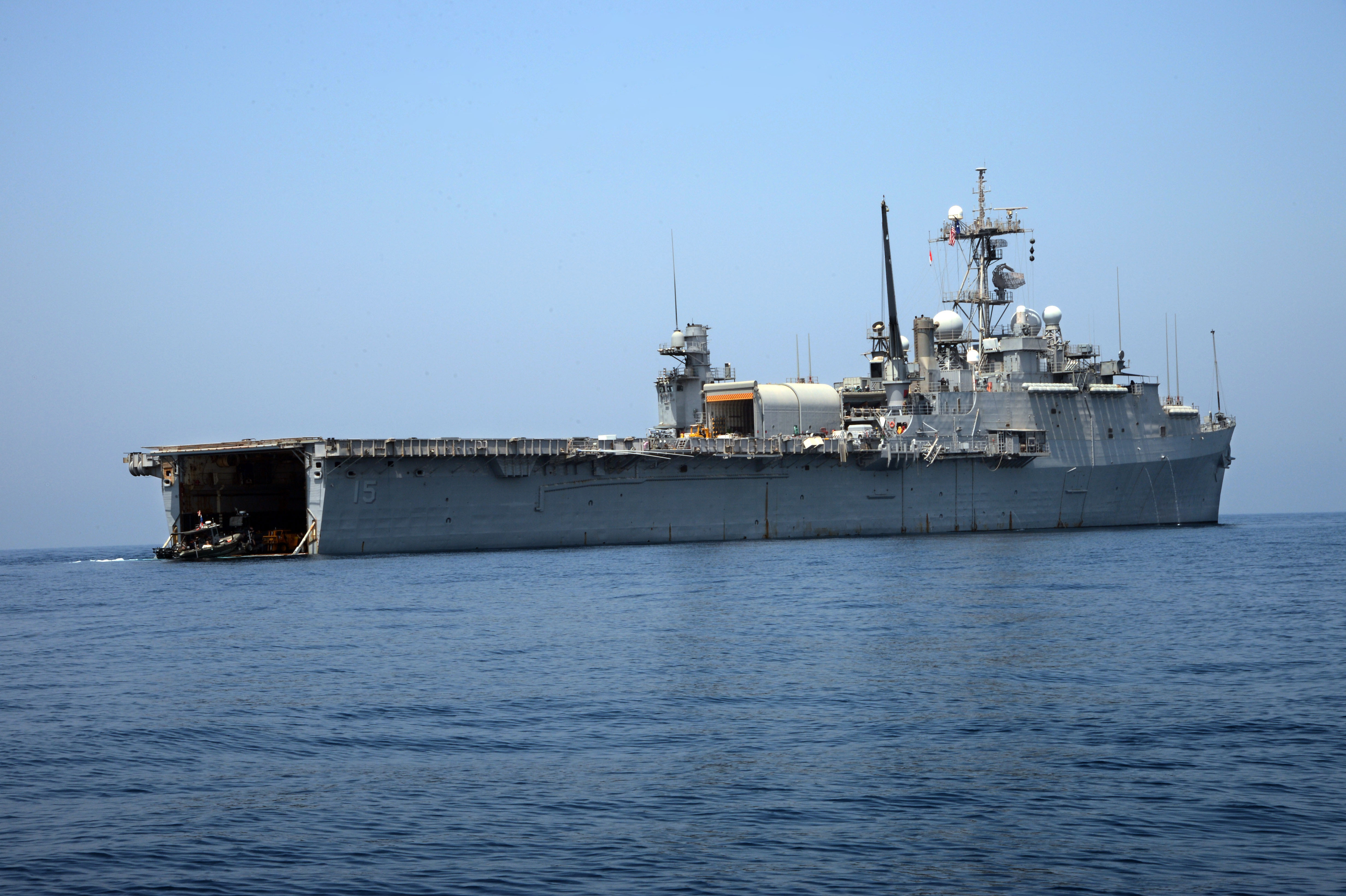
USS Ponce

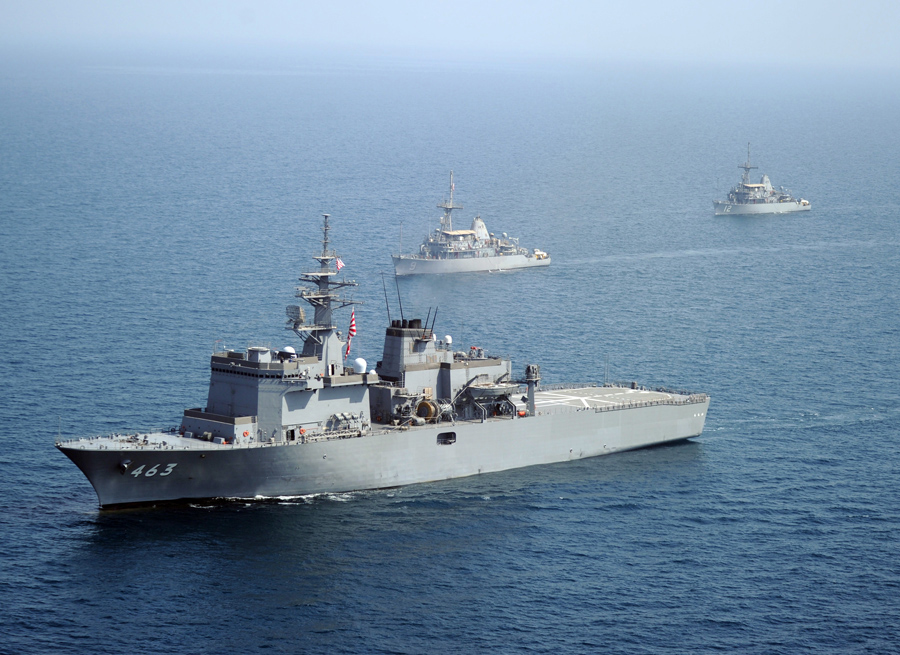
IMCMEX 2012

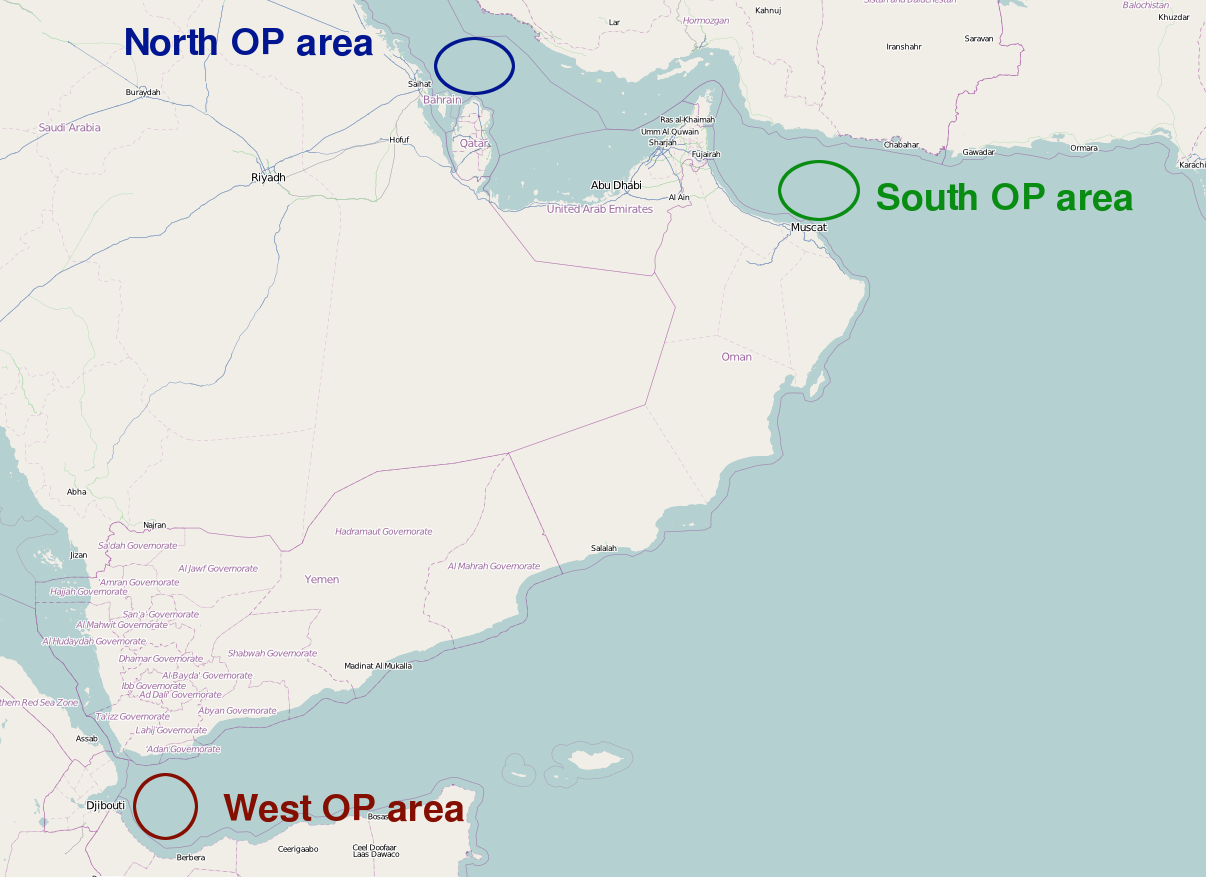
IMCMEX 2012 map

On 7 January 2012, the United Kingdom announced that it would be sending the Type 45 destroyer HMS Daring to the Persian Gulf. Daring, which is the lead ship of her class was claimed to be one of the "most advanced warships" in the world, and undertook its first mission in the Persian Gulf. However, the British Government said that this move was long-planned, as Daring replaced another Armilla patrol frigate. During this maiden deployment, Daring operated with Carrier Strike Group One in the Persian Gulf and Carrier Strike Group Nine in the North Arabian Sea.

On 9 January 2012, Iranian Defense Minister Ahmad Vahidi denied that Iran had ever claimed that it would close the Strait of Hormuz, saying that "the Islamic Republic of Iran is the most important provider of security in the strait...if one threatens the security of the Persian Gulf, then all are threatened." Vahidi reiterated that "transnational forces" have no place in the Persian Gulf region. Also, on 9 January 2012, Carrier Strike Group One, led by the carrier Carl Vinson, joined Carrier Strike Group Three, led by the John C. Stennis, in the North Arabian Sea. Carrier Strike Group Nine, led by the carrier Abraham Lincoln, was en route to the Arabian Sea amid rising tensions over the Strait of Hormuz.

The Iranian Foreign Ministry confirmed on 16 January 2012 that received a letter from the United States concerning the Strait of Hormuz, "via three different channels." Authorities considered whether to reply, although the contents of the letter were not divulged. The US had previously announced its intention to warn Iran that closing the Strait of Hormuz is a "red line" that would provoke an American response. General Martin E. Dempsey, the chairman of the Joint Chiefs of Staff, stated that the United States would "take action and reopen the strait," which could be accomplished only by military means, including minesweepers, warship escorts and potentially airstrikes. Defense Secretary Leon E. Panetta told troops in Texas that the United States would not tolerate Iran's closing of the strait. Nevertheless, Iran continued to discuss the impact of shutting the Strait on world oil markets, saying that any disruption of supply would cause a shock to markets that "no country" could manage.

On 19 January 2012, Carrier Strike Group Nine entered the U.S. Fifth Fleet's area of responsibility and relieved Carrier Strike Group Three (pictured). Also on that date, Ambassador of Iran to the United Nations Mohammad Khazaee reportedly stated in a 2012 interview on the Charlie Rose Show that Iran would consider closing the Strait of Hormuz if Iran's security was endangered.

On 22 January 2012, Carrier Strike Group Nine was joined by the British Type 23 frigate Argyll and the French frigate La Motte-Picquet and together this American-British-French naval flotilla transited the Strait of Hormuz into the Persian Gulf without incident. By 23 January, a flotilla had been established by countries opposing Iran's threats to close the Hormuz Strait. These ships operated in the Persian Gulf and Arabian Sea off the coast of Iran. The flotilla included two American aircraft carriers (Carl Vinson and Abraham Lincoln), three destroyers (USS Momsen, USS Sterett, USS Russell) and seven British warships including the destroyer Daring and a number of Type 23 frigates (HMS Westminster, Argyll and HMS Somerset).

On 24 January tensions rose further after the European Union imposed sanctions on Iranian oil. A senior member of Iran's parliament said that the Islamic Republic would close the entry point to the Gulf if new sanctions blocked its oil exports. "If any disruption happens regarding the sale of Iranian oil, the Strait of Hormuz will definitely be closed," Mohammad Kossari, deputy head of parliament's Foreign Affairs and National Security Committee, told the semi-official Fars News Agency.

On 14 February 2012, the carrier Abraham Lincoln, the cruiser Cape St. George, and the destroyer Sterett transited through Strait of Hormuz into the northern Arabian Sea, concluding Carrier Strike Group Nine's initial operations in the Persian Gulf. The strike group's movements were monitored by Iranian patrol boats and aircraft during its transit. In addition to combat air support for coalition forces in Afghanistan, Carrier Strike Group Nine maintained flights operations some 30 nautical miles (56 km; 35 mi) off the coast of Iran.

On 6 June 2012, the former amphibious transport dock Ponce (pictured) joined the U.S. Fifth Fleet. The Ponce was converted at a "mother-ship for MH-53E Sea Dragon mine-sweeping helicopters. The U.S. Navy also deployed four more MH-53E helicopter to reinforce the six helicopters based in the Persian Gulf. On 24 June 2012, four Avenger-class mine countermeasures ships joined the U.S. Fifth Fleet for a seven-month deployment. The four ships joined the four other Avenger-class minesweepers based in the Persian Gulf as well as the four British Royal Navy minesweepers operating with the Armilla Patrol. Both U.S. mine-sweeping ships and helicopters were refitted with the new Seafox anti-mine marine drones.

In July 2012, Iranian General Hasan Firouzabadi announced Iran's plans to block the Strait of Hormuz if the country's interests are seriously threatened.

The International Mine Countermeasures Exercise 2012, (IMCMEX 12) or IMCMEX 2012, was held 16–27 September 2012 in multiple locations in the U.S. Naval Forces Central Command (NAVCENT) area of operations (pictured). This multi-national mine warfare exercise was the largest ever held in the region, and it involved navies from more than 30 nations. The purpose of IMCMEX 12 was protecting three critical maritime chokepoints at the Strait of Hormuz, the Suez Canal, and the Strait of Bab-el-Mandeb (see map).

The Iranian Navy carried out Velayat 91, a six-day exercise held in the Strait of Hormuz that began on 28 December 2012. The exercise commander, Rear Admiral Habibollah Sayyari, noted:

Among the aims of the drill is to display the capabilities of Iran's Armed Forces and the navy to defend our country's water borders and interests in line with establishing durable security in the region and conveying the message of peace and friendship to the neighboring states.

During Velayat 91, the Iranian Navy test-fired its Noor and Qader cruise missiles, its Ra'd anti-aircraft missiles, and its Nasr tactical ballistic missile.

== Consequences ==
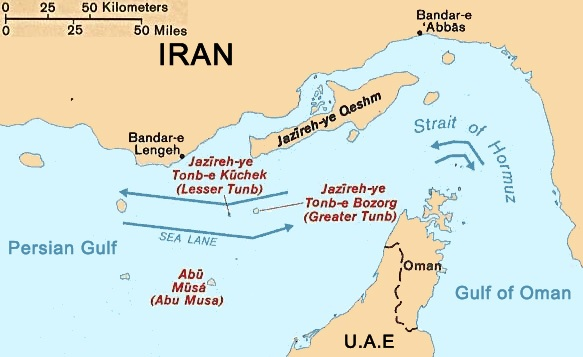
Blue arrows illustrate the Traffic Separation Scheme for the Strait of Hormuz.

Despite an initial 2% rise in oil prices, oil markets ultimately did not react significantly to the Iranian threat, with oil analyst Thorbjoern Bak Jensen of Global Risk Management concluding that "they cannot stop the flow for a longer period due to the amount of U.S. hardware in the area". While earlier statements from Iran had little effect on global oil markets, coupled with the new sanctions, these terse comments from Iran are driving crude futures higher, up over 4%. Pressure on prices reflect a combination of uncertainty driven further by China's recent response – reducing oil January 2012 purchases from Iran by 50% compared to those made in 2011.

The closure of the Strait of Hormuz would inflate oil prices, not only in the west but in Asian countries such as Japan, India, and South Korea. All three countries collectively account for 42% of Iranian oil exports – Japan 17%, South Korea 9%, and India 16%. China is another importer of Iranian oil, of which it accounts for 20% of Iran's oil exports.

== Warships ==
A number of countries dispatched warships to the Persian Gulf and Arabian Sea in an effort to ward off any Iranian closure of the Hormuz Strait.

Known warships operating off the coast of Iran – as of 24 January 2012
United States Navy

Carrier Strike Group One

| Surface warships | Carrier Air Wing Seventeen (CVW-17) squadrons embarked aboard flagship USS Carl Vinson (CVN-70) | |
|---|---|---|
| USS Bunker Hill (CG-52) | Strike Fighter Squadron 113 (VFA-113): 10 F/A-18C | Tactical Electronics Warfare Squadron 134 (VAQ-134): 4 EA-6B |
| USS Stockdale (DDG-106) | Strike Fighter Squadron 81 (VFA-81): 10 F/A-18E | Carrier Airborne Early Warning Squadron 125 (VAW-125): 4 E-2C |
| USS Gridley (DDG-101) | Strike Fighter Squadron 25 (VFA-25): 10 F/A-18C | Helicopter Anti-Submarine Squadron 15 (HS-15): 7 HH-60F/SH-60F |
| USS Higgins (DDG-76) | Strike Fighter Squadron 22 (VFA-22): 12 F/A-18F | Fleet Logistics Support Squadron 40 (VRC-40), Det.4: 2 C-2A |

Carrier Strike Group Three

| Surface warships | Carrier Air Wing Nine (CVW-9) squadrons embarked aboard flagship USS John C. Stennis (CVN-74) | |
|---|---|---|
| USS Mobile Bay (CG-53) | Strike Fighter Squadron 192 (VFA-192): 10 F/A-18C | Carrier Airborne Early Warning 112 (VAW-112): 4 E-2C |
| USS Wayne E. Meyer (DDG-108) | Strike Fighter Squadron 97 (VFA-97): 10 F/A-18C | Fleet Logistics Support Squadron 40 (VRC-40), Det. 1: 2 C-2A |
| USS Dewey (DDG-105) | Strike Fighter Squadron 41 (VFA-41): 12 F/A-18F | Helicopter Sea Combat Squadron Squadron 8 (HSC-8): 7 MH-60S |
| USS Kidd (DDG-100) | Strike Fighter Squadron 14 (VFA-14): 12 F/A-18E | Helicopter Maritime Strike Squadron 71 (HSM-71): 11 MH-60R |
| USS Pinckney (DDG-91) | Electronic Attack Squadron 133 (VAQ-133): 4 EA-6B | —— |

Carrier Strike Group Nine

| Surface warships | Carrier Air Wing Two (CVW-2) squadrons embarked aboard flagship USS Abraham Lincoln (CVN-72) | |
|---|---|---|
| USS Cape St. George (CG-71) | Strike Fighter Squadron 151 (VFA-151): 10 F/A-18C | Carrier Airborne Early Warning Squadron (VAW-116): 4 E-2C |
| USS Sterett (DDG-104) | Strike Fighter Squadron 137 (VFA-137): 12 F/A-18E | Helicopter Sea Combat Squadron 12 (HSC-12): 8 MH-60S |
| USS Halsey (DDG-97) | Strike Fighter Squadron 34 (VFA-34): 12 F/A-18C(N) | Fleet Logistics Support Squadron 30 (VRC-30), Det. 2: 2 C-2A |
| USS Momsen (DDG-92) | Strike Fighter Squadron 2 (VFA-2): 12 F/A-18F | Helicopter Strike Maritime Squadron 77 (HSM-77), Det. 7: 8 SH-60B |
| —— | Tactical Electronics Warfare Squadron 131 (VAQ-131): 5 EA-6B | —— |

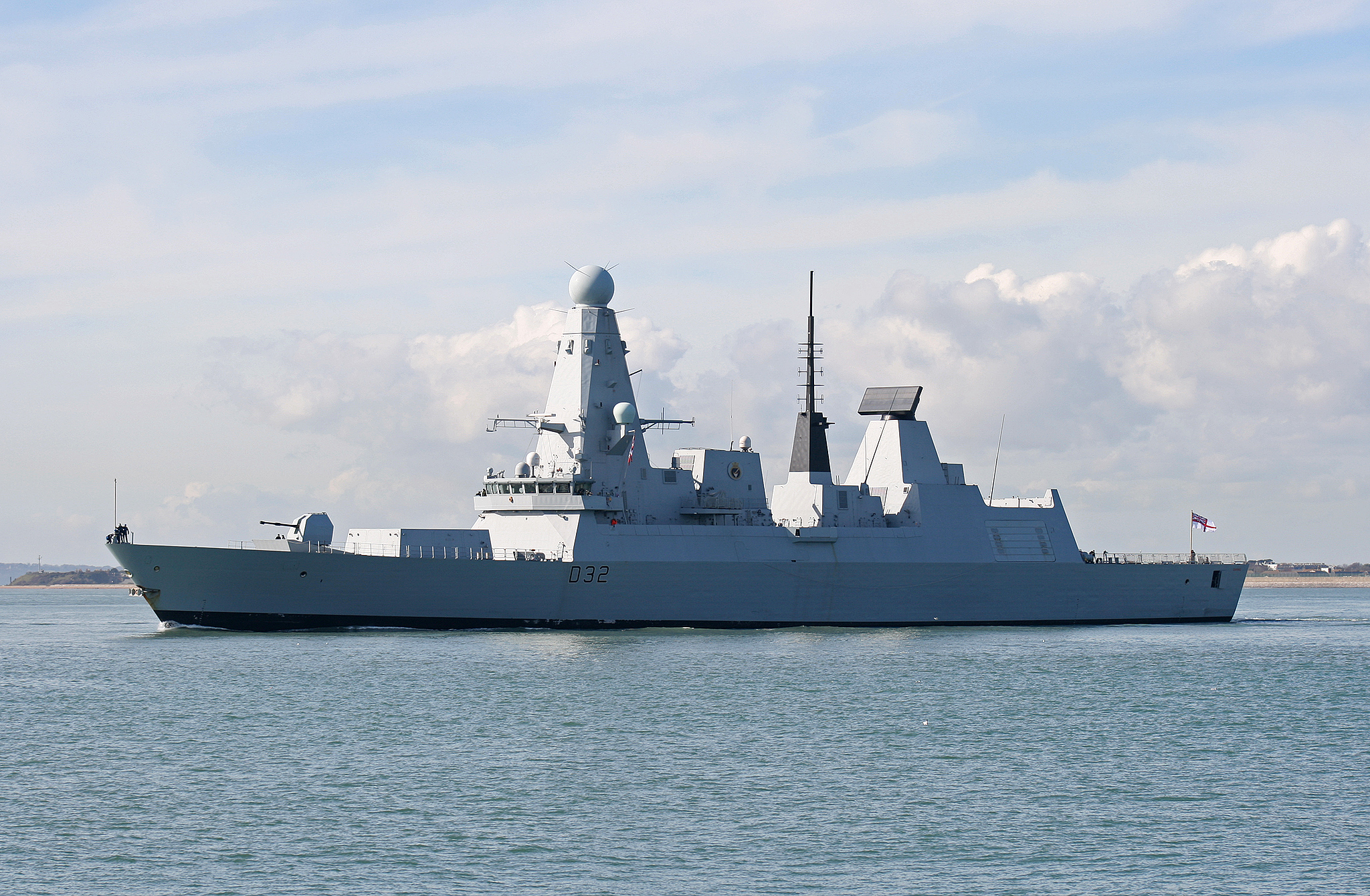
HMS Daring, the Royal Navy's newest warship was dispatched to the area on 6 January 2012.

(United Kingdom) Royal Navy

- HMS Argyll
- HMS Somerset
- RFA Lyme Bay
- HMS Ramsey
- HMS Echo
- HMS Daring
- HMS Westminster
- HMS St Albans
- Trafalgar-class submarine

(France) French Navy

- La Motte-Picquet

== See also ==
- 2007 Iranian arrest of Royal Navy personnel
- 2008 U.S.–Iranian naval dispute
- 2016 U.S.–Iran naval incident
- Iran–United States relations during the Obama administration
