= Carrier Strike Group Nine 2004–09 operations =

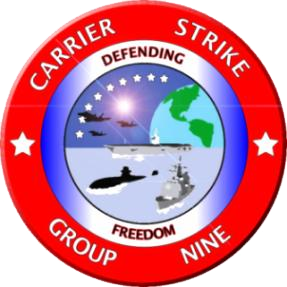
Carrier Strike Group Nine crest

Carrier Strike Group Nine is a U.S. Navy formation. The group is one of six U.S. Navy carrier strike groups assigned to the U.S. Pacific Fleet. In 2004–09, it was based at Naval Base San Diego and its flagship was the Nimitz-class aircraft carrier USS Abraham Lincoln (CVN-72).

The group's operations between 2004 and 2009 included three Western Pacific deployments in support of Operation Enduring Freedom, the War in Iraq, and the War in Afghanistan, as well as providing support for regional Maritime Security Operations. Additionally, the group also participated in the major military exercises RSOI/Foal Eagle 2006, Valiant Shield, and RIMPAC 2006, as well as Operation Unified Assistance, the U.S. military response to the aftermath of the 2004 Indian Ocean earthquake and tsunami. In recognition of its disaster-relief mission to Indonesia, the group received the Humanitarian Service Medal.

During this period, the group was the second carrier strike group to be commanded by a former nuclear submarine commanding officer. It was also the first strike group to deploy with an entire Light Airborne Multi-Purpose System (LAMPS) helicopter squadron embarked, with individual air detachments operating from its escort ships and supported by the carrier's aviation facilities. The carrier strike group's 2007 pre-deployment Composite Unit Training Exercise included Mobile Security Squadron 2, and Helicopter Visit, Board, Search and Seizure (HVBSS) Team 1, a highly specialized boarding party, which was a first for West Coast-based ships.

== Operational history ==
=== 2004–2005 deployment ===
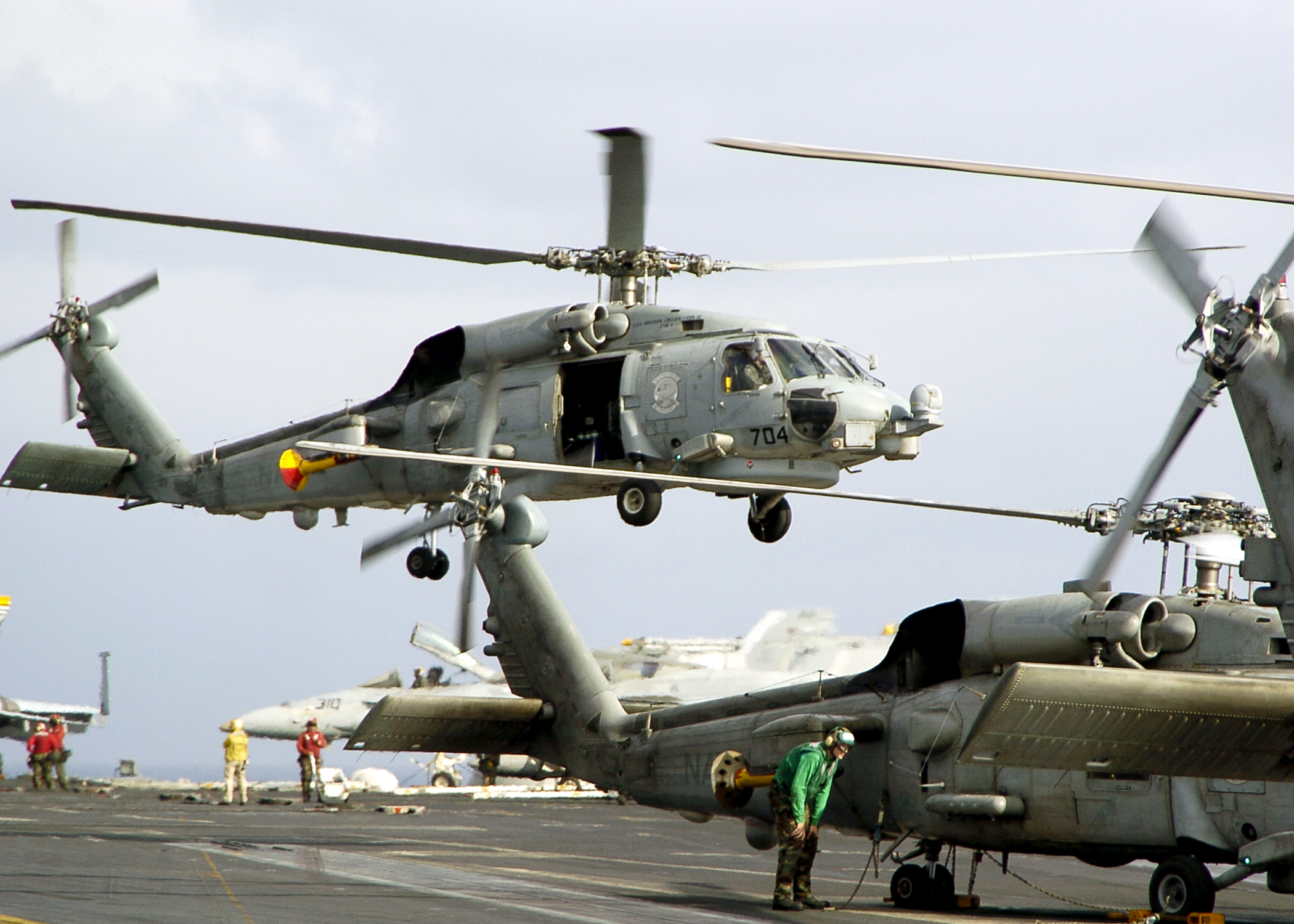
HSL-47 helos landing on board Abraham Lincoln (13 November 2004)

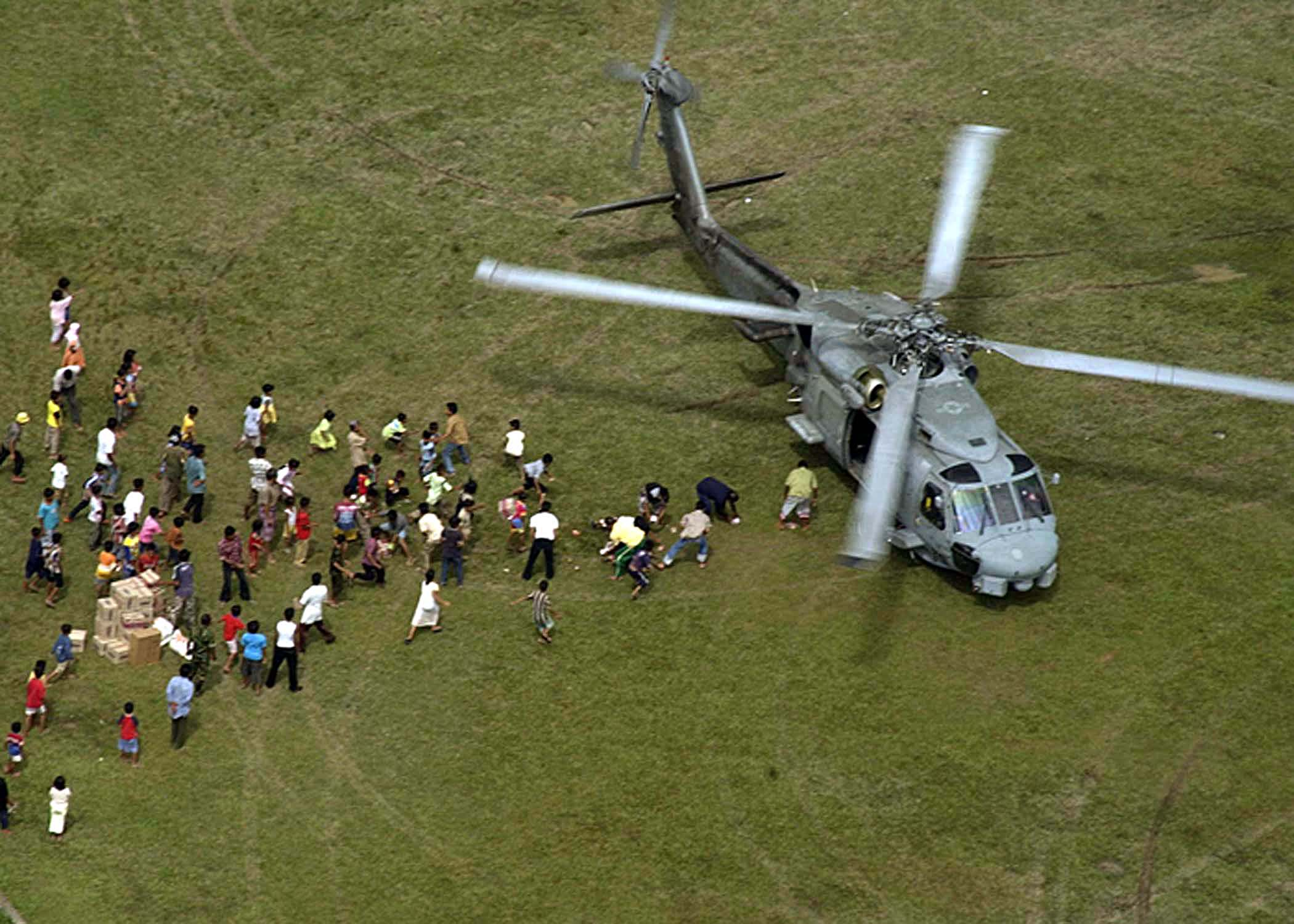
HSL-47 SH-60B Seahawk helicopter (16 January 2005)

On 19 October 2004, the newly re-designated Carrier Strike Group Nine departed Naval Base San Diego, California, for its 2004–2005 deployment under the command of Rear Admiral William D. Crowder. During its 2004–2005 deployment, Carrier Strike Group Nine executed 4400 fix-winged sorties and completed 4455 flight deck landings (traps) for a total of 7588 flight hours. Also, the group executed 1518 rotary-wing sorties for a total of 4401 flight hours, including flying 1737 humanitarian relief missions in support of Operation Unified Assistance between 26 December 2004 and 3 February 2005. Also, helicopter squadron HSL-47 (pictured) was the first LAMPS helicopter squadron deployed in its entirety on board an aircraft carrier, with the squadron providing LAMPS detachments to the other ships within the strike group. During this 2004–2005 deployment, HSL-47 detachments operated from the cruiser Cape St. George and the destroyer Shoup.

On 26 December 2004, a massive submerged earthquake and ensuing tsunami waves swept across the Indian Ocean basin, causing widespread devastation and killing over 230,000 people in fourteen countries. The military element of humanitarian and relief effort was designated Operation Unified Assistance under the direction of Combined Support Force 536 (CSF-536). On 28 December 2004, Carrier Strike Group Nine set sail from Hong Kong and arrived off the coast of Indonesia near Banda Aceh, Sumatra, on 1 January 2005. Rear Admiral William D. Crowder, was designated as commander, Combined Support Group Indonesia, as part of CSF-536. Abraham Lincoln's Air Transportation Office coordinated the flow of supplies into the region, and the carrier provided air traffic control for the relief effort. SH-60 helicopters Seahawks from squadrons HSL-47 and HS-2 ferried supplies from collection points in Sumatra for trans-shipment to disaster victims in the vicinity. The intensive nature of the support missions drove the Seahawks to log over 1,000 hours, more than three times the expected wear-and-tear of standard deployments. HSL-47 itself logged over 600 hours during the month of January 2005. Strike group ships, such as the destroyer Benfold, served as re-fueling stations for helicopters involved in relief efforts. Benfold provided 155 U.S. gallons (590 liters) of fuel a day, accounting for more than 14,500 U.S. gallons (55,000 liters) of fuel since this disaster relief operation began. Benfold also served as a mothership for Naval Oceanographic Office team conducting safety of navigation surveys of the altered Indonesian coastlines that had been affected by the tsunami at the request of the Indonesian government. The fast combat support ship Rainier provided underway replenishment support to 32 American, British, and Australian warships involved in Operation Unified Assistance. Also, sailors and Marines from Carrier Strike Group Nine went ashore to provide humanitarian assistance. Sailors from the Abraham Lincoln's Engineering Department Repair Division designed a potable water manifold to help bring fresh water to Aceh Province, Sumatra, with the system beginning to ship the much-needed fresh water on 4 January. Also, teams from the strike group, including the destroyer Benfold, flew into Banda Aceh daily to work at the Sultan IskandarMuda Air Force Base to unload humanitarian aid from trucks to waiting helicopters that deliver the aid to survivors in remote locations.

In total, Carrier Strike Group Nine delivered 5,929 million pounds (2,689 million kilograms) of relief and humanitarian supplies, including 2,915,500 pounds (1,322,400 kg) of food and 748,410 pounds (339,470 kg) of medical supplies, during Operation Unified Assistance (OUA). Carrier Strike Group received the Humanitarian Service Medal in recognition of its humanitarian assistance/disaster response (HA/DR) efforts during the OUA mission.

Carrier Strike Group Nine entered the U.S. Third Fleet's Area of Responsibility between 21 and 22 February 2005 and completed its 2004–2005 deployment when it returned to its home port of San Diego on 4 March 2005.

2004–2005 deployment force composition

CARSTRKGRU 9 Warships	Carrier Air Wing Two (CVW-2) squadrons embarked aboard flagship USS Abraham Lincoln (CVN-72)	
USS Cape St. George (CG-71)	Strike Fighter Squadron 151 (VFA-151): F/A-18C(N)	Carrier Airborne Early Warning Squadron (VAW-116): E-2C 2000 NP
USS Shoup (DDG-86)	Strike Fighter Squadron 137 (VFA-137): F/A-18E	Helicopter Anti-Submarine Squadron 2 (HS-2): HH-60H & SH-60F
USS Benfold (DDG-65)	Strike Fighter Squadron 82 (VFA-82): F/A-18C(N)	Fleet Logistics Support Squadron 30 (VRC-30), Det. 4: C-2A
USS Louisville (SSN-724)	Strike Fighter Squadron 2 (VFA-2):: F/A-18F	Helicopter Antisubmarine Squadron Light 47 (HSL-47): SH-60B
USNS Rainier (T-AOE-7)	Tactical Electronics Warfare Squadron 131 (VAQ-131): EA-6B	–

2004–2005 deployment exercises and port visits

Number	Exercises				Port Visits		Notes
Number	Duration	U.S. Force	Bilateral Partner	Operating Area	Location	Dates	Notes
1st:	——	Carrier Strike Group Nine	——	——	Pearl Harbor	5–6 Nov 2004	
2nd:	–	Carrier Strike Group Nine	——	——	Hong Kong	5–9 Feb 2005	
3rd:	——	Carrier Strike Group Nine	——	——	Pearl Harbor	23–24 Feb 2005	

=== 2006 deployment ===
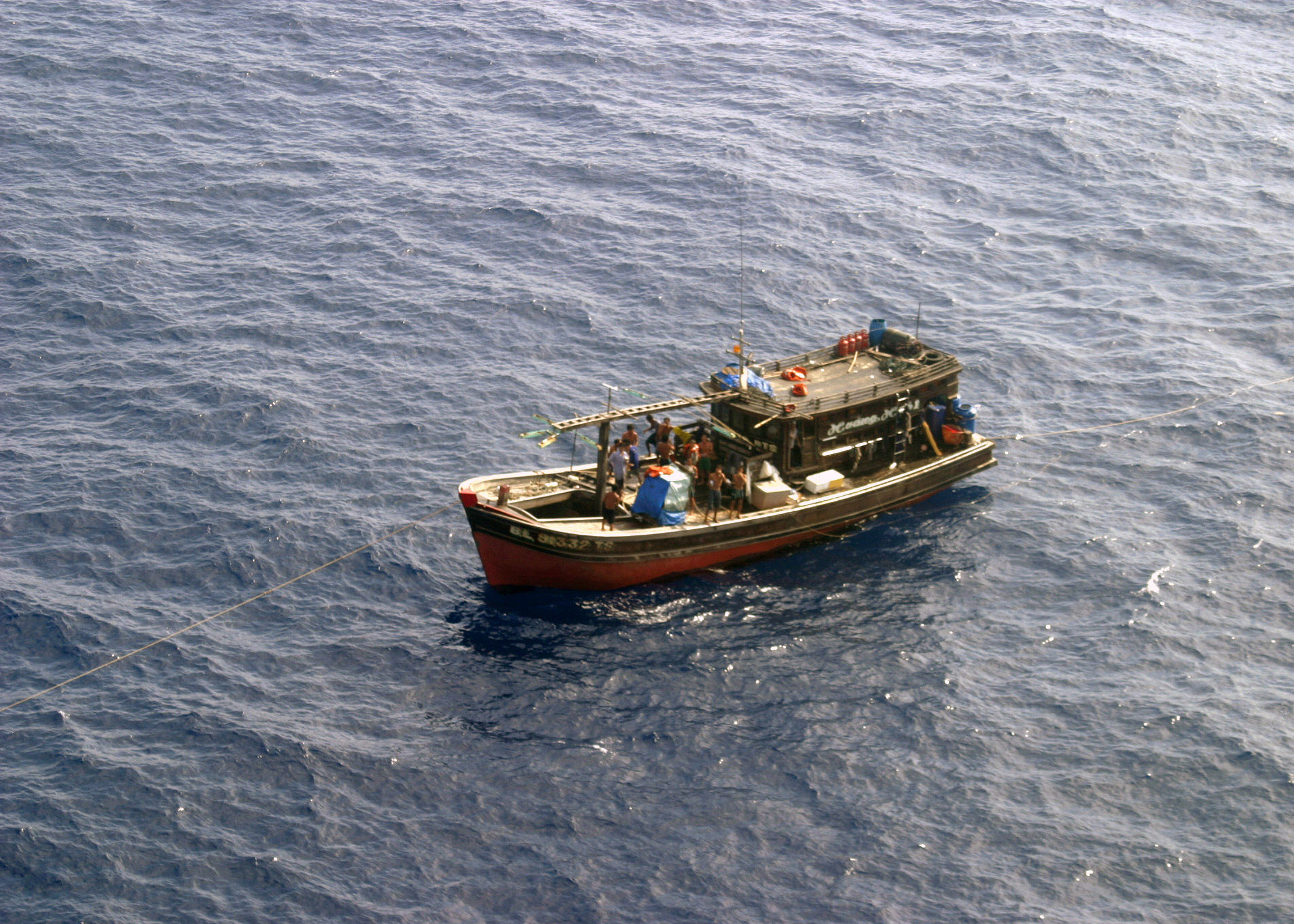
Distress call (15 April 2006)

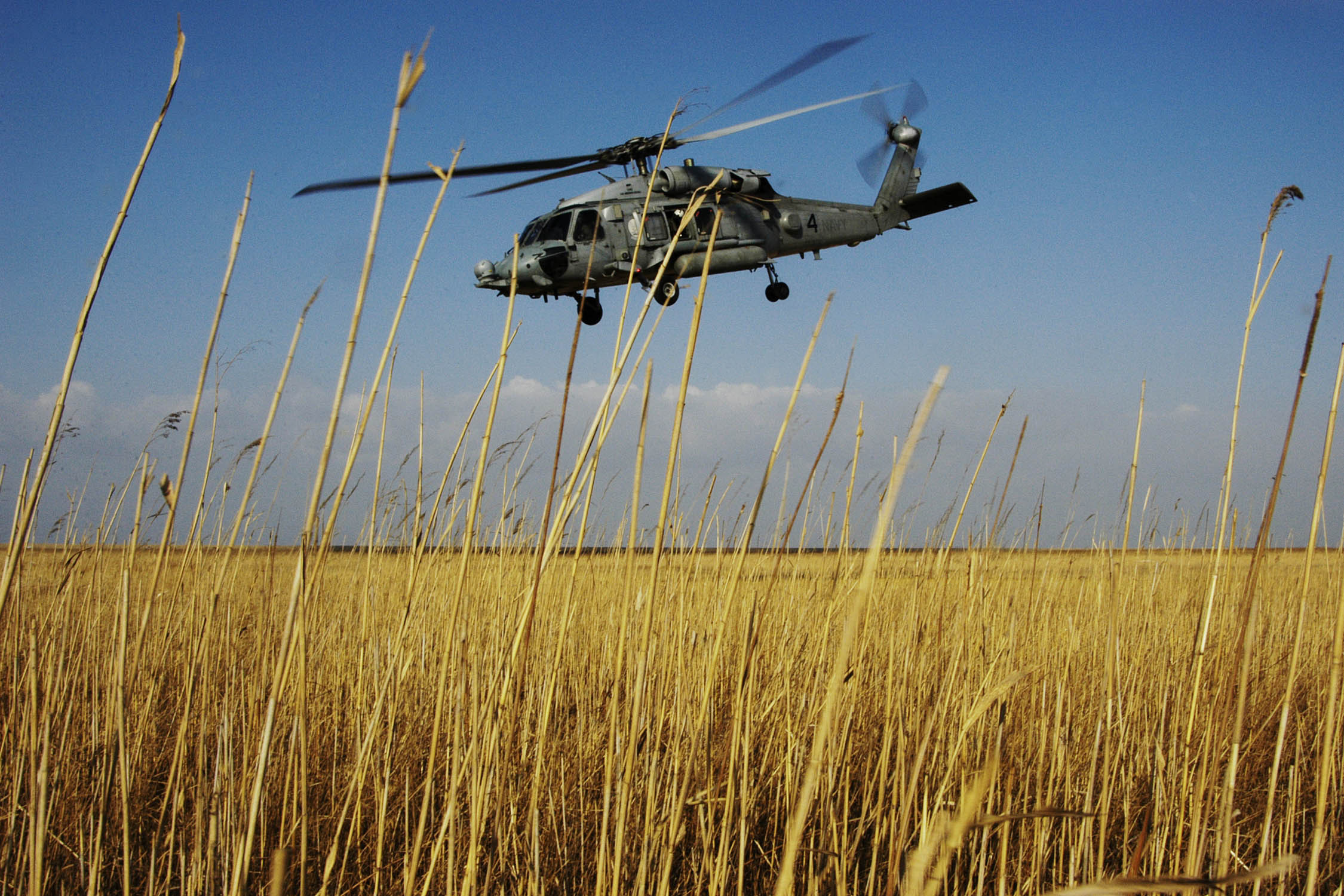
RSOI/Foal Eagle 06

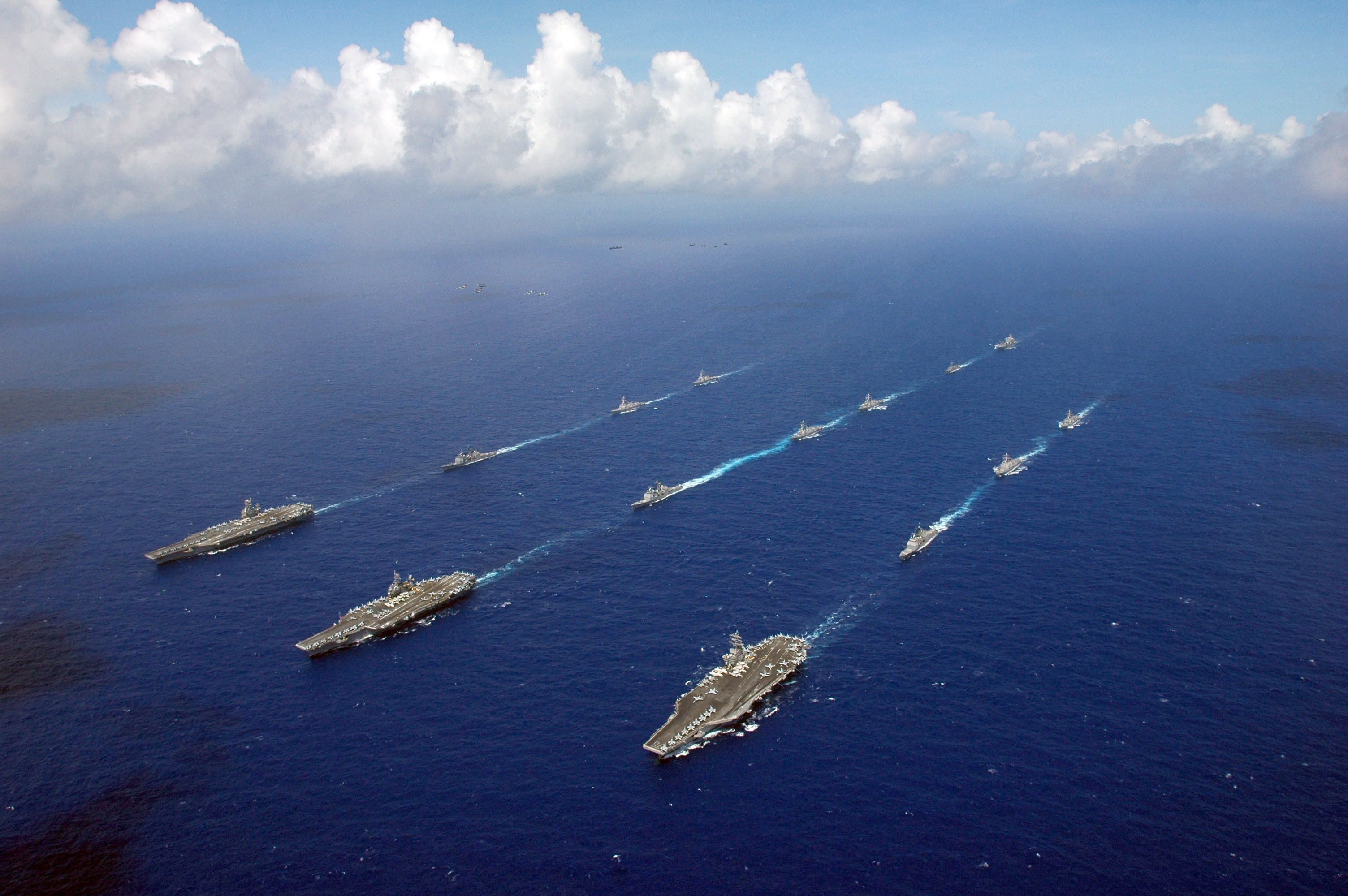
Valiant Shield 2006

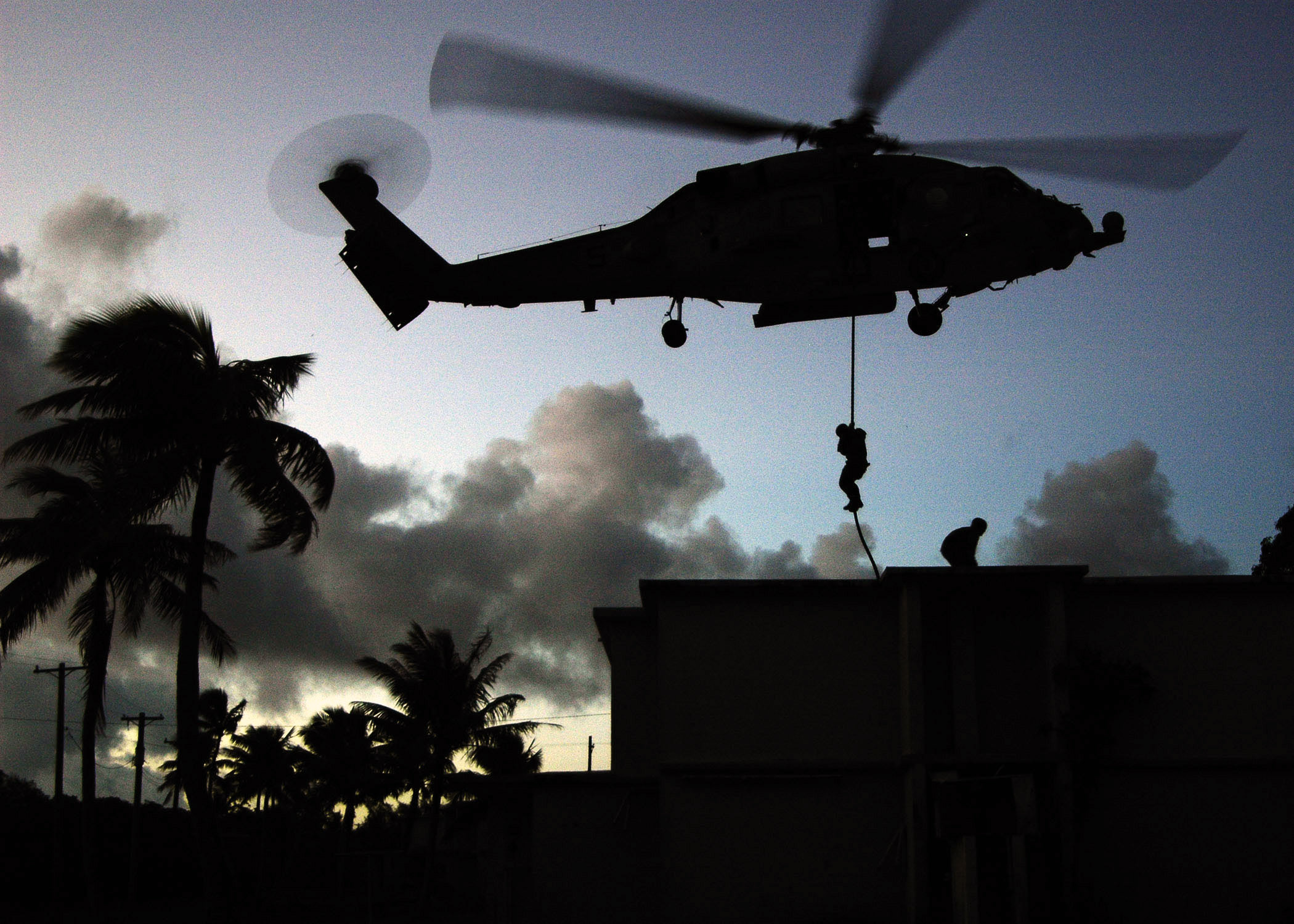
HS-2 helicopter on Guam

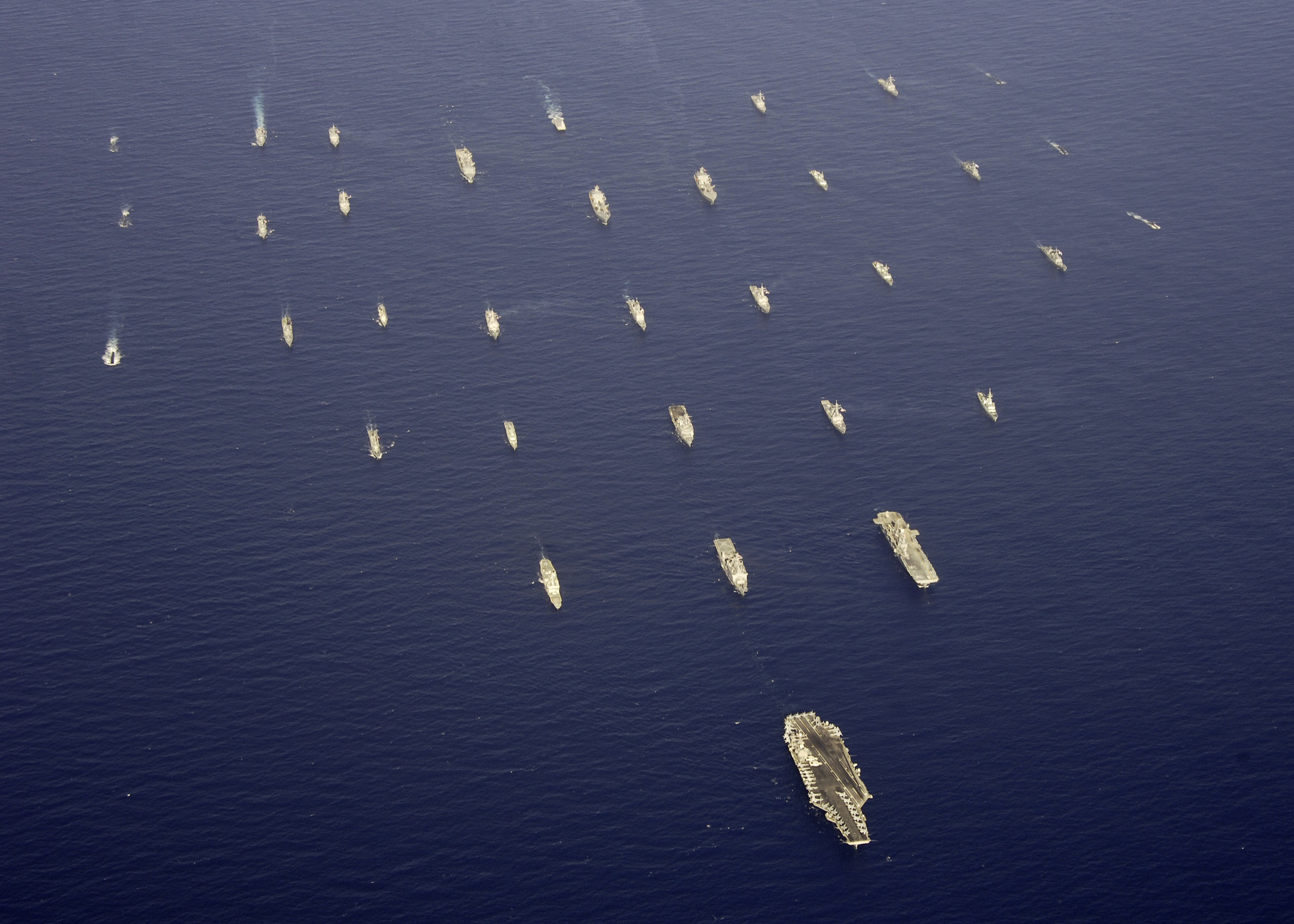
RIMPAC 2006

Abraham Lincoln completed additional sustainment training in southern Californian waters between 21 and 24 February 2006 and departed Everett on 27 February 2006 under the command of Rear Admiral John W. Goodwin. The carrier sailed to southern Californian waters to rendezvous with the guided-missile cruiser Mobile Bay and DESRON-9 guided-missile destroyers Shoup and Russell and to embark Carrier Air Wing Two (CVW-2).

Between 25 and 27 March 2006, the group participated in an Undersea Warfare Exercise, a series of anti-submarine warfare exercises in Hawaiian waters while en route to the U.S. Seventh Fleet's area of responsibility. In addition to the strike group, exercise also included the nuclear-powered attack submarines Seawolf, Cheyenne, Greeneville, Tucson, and Pasadena, as well as land-based P-3 Orion aircraft from patrol squadrons VP-4, VP-9, and VP-47.

Between 24 and 31 March 2006, military personnel and units of the United States, and the Republic of Korea Armed Forces took part in Reception, Staging, Onward-movement, & Integration (RSOI)/Foal Eagle 2006, the annual defence of Korea exercise. Foal Eagle involved more than 70 U.S. and Republic of Korea Navy warships and more than 100 aircraft. As part of RSOI/Foal Eagle 06, Carrier Strike Group Nine carried out exercises with the Korean Navy. Carrier Air Wing Two strike squadrons VFA-2, VFA-34, VFA-137, and VFA-151 teamed with U.S. Air Force aircraft from the 18th Wing based at Kadena Air Base for combat air patrols and coordinated bombing runs. Also, five South Korean naval officers embarked aboard Abraham Lincoln to train with the ship's crew. On 29 March 2006, General B. B. Bell, Commander, United States Forces Korea, along with Deputy Commander Combined Forces, General Hee Won-lee, and other senior members of the Republic of Korea Armed Forces, flew aboard the Abraham Lincoln to witness the carrier strike group's operations. Following RSOI/Foal Eagle 06, Carrier Strike Group Nine paid a port visit to Hong Kong between 6–10 April 2006.

On 15 April 2006, HSL-47 helicopters and the destroyer Russell provided aid to a fishing vessel in distress (pictured) while operating in the South China Sea.

Carrier Strike Group Nine also paid a port visit to Singapore between 27 April–1 May 2006 and subsequently transited the eastern portion of the Strait of Malacca. On 3 May 2006, while conducting flight operations in the Java Sea, the strike group was visited by U.S. Ambassador to Indonesia B. Lynn Pascoe and Lt. Gen. Sjafrie Sjamsoeddin, Indonesian secretary-general of defense, who thanked the strike group for their relief work during Operation Unified Assistance. On 9 May 2006, Prince Mohamed Bolkiah, the Minister of Foreign Affairs of Brunei Darussalam, along with several government officials, the heads of Brunei's armed forces, and Chargé d'affaires of the U.S. Embassy to Brunei Jeff Hawkins, visited USS Abraham Lincoln off the northwest coast of the island of Borneo to thank the strike group for its Operation Unified Assistance relief work. During its 2006 WESTPAC deployment, Carrier Strike Group Nine hosted more than 3,000 Distinguished Visitors (DV), public visitors, and members of the media.

During May 2006, while en route to Sasebo, Japan, Carrier Strike Group Nine had to divert its course because of Typhoon Chanchu by through Philippine waters via the Balabac Strait, between the Philippine island of Palawan and Sabah, Borneo, crossed the Sulu Sea, and then transited the Surigao Strait between the islands of Mindanao and Samar before the group returned to its original course for Japan.

Valiant Shield 2006 was held in the Guam operating area between 19 and 23 June 2006, and it included 28 naval vessels, nearly 300 aircraft and, approximately 22,000 service members from the U.S. Navy, U.S. Air Force, U.S. Marine Corps, and U.S. Coast Guard. Valiant Shield is a joint exercise designed to reinforce the United States' commitment to the Pacific Region by demonstrating the U.S. military's ability to conduct joint command and control operations and rapidly deploying joint forces in response to any regional contingency. The centerpiece of ValiantShield 2006 was the three carrier strike groups, Carrier Strike Group Five, Carrier Strike Group Seven, and Carrier Strike Group Nine, which was the first time that three carrier strike groups had operated together in the Pacific in over ten years. Valiant Shield 2006 provided Carrier Strike Group Nine with the opportunity to exploit the tactical flexibility of its FA-18C Hornet strike fighter, undertake undersea warfare detection and tracking, and provide command and control capabilities, as well as the air intercept capabilities of the AEGIS radar-equipped cruiser Mobile Bay. Also, helicopter squadron HS-2 flew to Guam to participate naval special warfare missions, such as dropping SEAL teams onto rooftops in an urban environment at night (pictured), with SEAL Team 1 and Explosive Ordnance Disposal Mobile Unit 5. On 17 June 2006, twenty-two military observers from Russia, India, and Japan flew from Anderson Air Force Base, Guam, to the carrier Abraham Lincoln via a squadron VRC-20 C-2A Greyhound cargo plane to observe Valiant Shield 2006. During their visit, the guests toured the combat direction center, hangar bays, and bridge, and watched flight operations from the flight deck. Valiant Shield 06 marked the first time that Chinese military observers were invited to a major U.S. wargame exercise.

On 27 June 2006, the group entered the U.S. Third Fleet area of responsibility and paid a port visit to Naval Station Pearl Harbor, Hawaii.

Held between 30 June–29 July 2006, Rim of the Pacific Exercise 2006 (RIMPAC 2006) was the twentieth in a series of multilateral maritime exercises conducted biennially since 1971. It involved naval forces from the Royal Australian Navy, the Canadian Forces Maritime Command, the Chilean Navy, the Peruvian Navy, the Japanese JMSDF, the Republic of Korea Navy, and the Royal Navy. RIMPAC training operations also included the participation of 35 ships, more than 60 aircraft and 18,000 Sailors, Airmen, Marines, Soldiers, and Coast Guardsmen of the U.S. Armed Forces. During the exercise, the carrier Lincoln served as the command and control hub for the multi-national task force (pictured). Destroyer Squadron 9 and helicopter squadrons HS-2 and HSL-47 of conducted anti-submarine warfare and anti-surface warfare training. Carrier Air Wing Two fixed-wing aircraft provided combat air patrol support for the multi-national fleet operation off Guam. The multi-nation task force also participated in four separate sinking exercises involving decommissioned U.S. naval vessels. On 9 July, the carrier Abraham Lincoln hosted a four-member delegation from the Australian Parliament who visited various parts of the ship, including medical spaces, the mess decks and the flight deck. On 29 July, more than 1,000 guests including sailors from each of the participating countries joined a pierside reception on board the Abraham Lincoln as she sailed from Naval Station Pearl Harbor, Hawaii, after the final weekend of RIMPAC 06.

On 8 August 2006, the strike group's flagship, the carrier Abraham Lincoln, returned to her homeport of Naval Station Everett, Washington, completing Carrier Strike Group Nine's 2006 deployment. During this deployment, Carrier Strike Group Nine participated in three major exercises (i.e., Foal Eagle 06, Valiant Shield 06, RIMPAC 06), as well as several passing exercises and port visits. Carrier Air Wing Two flew 7,871 sorties, with a total of 7,578 catapult launches from the flight deck of the Abraham Lincoln. Abraham Lincoln also returned the two SH-60B Seahawk aviation repairable pack-up kits, including four aviation consumable Vidmar cabinets, to NAS North Island.

2006 deployment force composition

CARSTRKGRU 9 Warships	Carrier Air Wing Two (CVW-2) squadrons embarked aboard flagship USS Abraham Lincoln (CVN-72)	
USS Mobile Bay (CG-53)	Strike Fighter Squadron 151 (VFA-151): 12 F/A-18C(N)	Carrier Airborne Early Warning Squadron (VAW-116): 4 E-2C 2000 NP
USS Shoup (DDG 86)	Strike Fighter Squadron 137 (VFA-137): 12 F/A-18E	Helicopter Anti-Submarine Squadron 2 (HS-2): 2 HH-60H & 4 SH-60F
USS Russell (DDG 59)	Strike Fighter Squadron 34 (VFA-34): 12 F/A-18C(N)	Fleet Logistics Support Squadron 30 (VRC-30), Det. 2: 2 C-2A
——	Strike Fighter Squadron 2 (VFA-2):: 10 F/A-18F	Helicopter Antisubmarine Squadron Light 47 (HSL-47): 2 SH-60B
——	Tactical Electronics Warfare Squadron 131 (VAQ-131): 4 EA-6B	——

2006 deployment exercises and port visits

Number	Passing Exercise (PASSEX)				Port Visits		Notes
Number	Duration	U.S. Force	Bilateral Partner	Operating Area	Location	Dates	Notes
1st:	22–23 Mar 2006	Carrier Strike Group Nine	Japanese Maritime Self-Defense Force (JMSDF) (Note: JMSDF warships were guided missile destroyers JDS Harusame (DD-102), JDS Hatakaze (DD-171), and JDS Kirishima (DDG-174).)	Western Pacific	–	–	
2nd:	10 April 2006	USS Mobile Bay (CG-53)	Hong Kong Governmental Flight Service (HKGFS) (Note: USS Mobile Bay participated in flight operations with a HKGFS fixed-wing aircraft and two helicopters involving search and rescue (SAR) exercises, helicopter deck-landing qualifications (DLQ), and re-fueling.)	South China Sea	Hong Kong	6–10 Apr 2006	
3rd:	24 April 2006	Carrier Strike Group Nine	Royal Thai Navy (RTN)	Gulf of Thailand	LaemChebang, Thailand	20–24 Apr 2006	
4th:	5–14 Jun 2006	Carrier Strike Group Nine	Japanese Maritime Self-Defense Force (JMSDF)	Western Pacific	Sasebo, Japan	25–29 May 2006	.

=== 2008 deployment ===
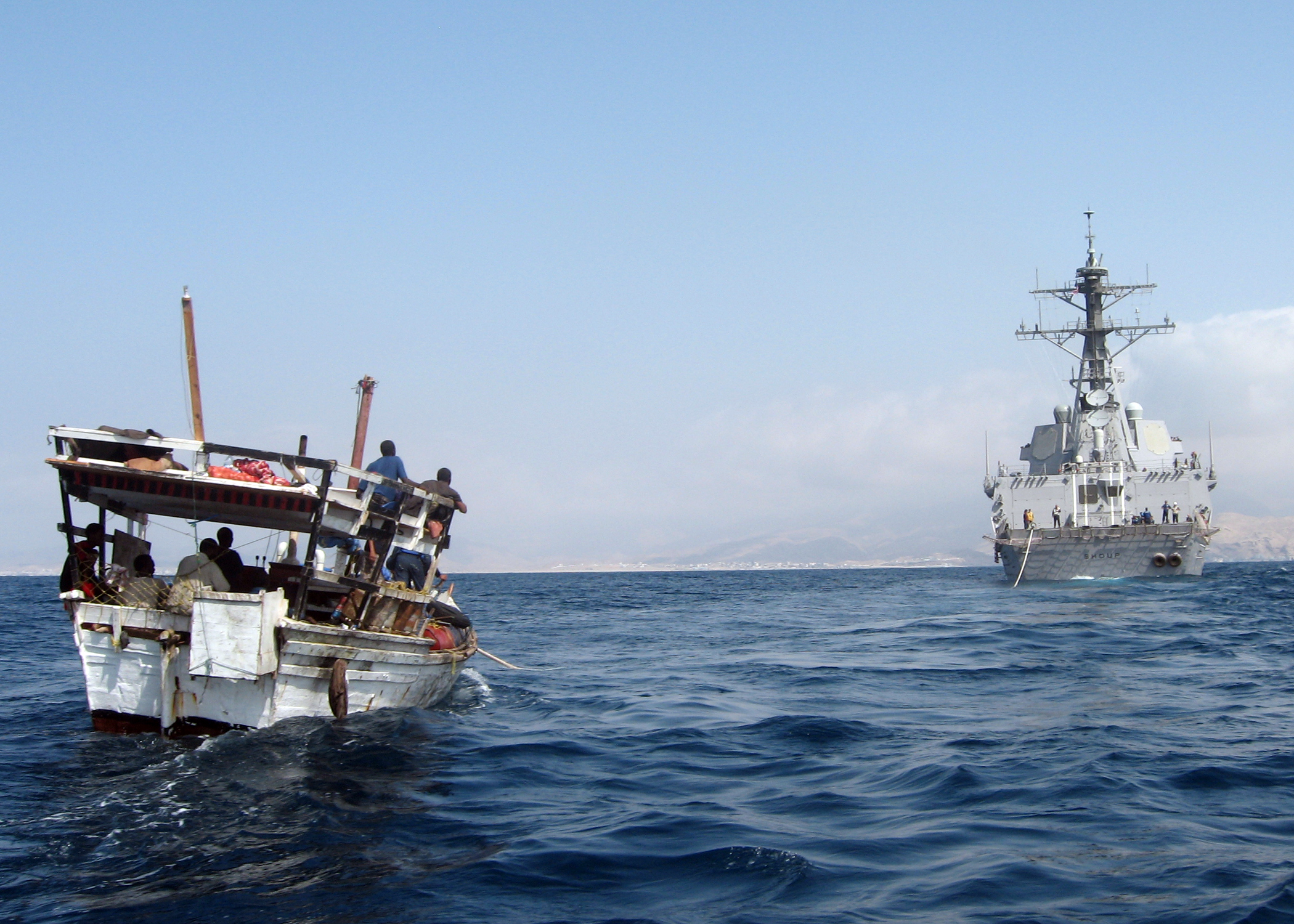
USS Shoup (DDG-86)

On 13 March 2008, Carrier Strike Group Nine departed from Naval Base San Diego, California, for its 2008 Western Pacific (WESTPAC) deployment under the overall command of Rear Admiral Scott R. Van Buskirk, USN aboard the strike group's flagship, the carrier Abraham Lincoln, with Carrier Air Wing Two (CVW-2) embarked on Lincoln.

On 1 May 2008, Carrier Strike Group Nine relieved Carrier Strike Group Ten led by the carrier Harry S. Truman. In addition to the various port visits and regional naval exercises, Carrier Strike Group Nine operated in the Persian Gulf and North Arabian Sea in support of Operation Enduring Freedom – Afghanistan and Operation Iraqi Freedom as a unit of the U.S. Fifth Fleet. Carrier Air Wing Two (CVW-2) flew approximately 7,100 sorties, totalling more than 22,000 flight hours, which included 2,307 combat sorties that dropped 255,963 pounds (116,103 kg) of ordnance.

On 9 May, while operating with Combined Task Force 150, the destroyer Shoup assisted a disabled dhow Dunia by towing it (pictured) from the Gulf of Aden to Mukalla, Yemen. Carrier Strike Group Nine also paid two port visit to Jebel Ali, United Arab Emirates (UAE), during its 2008 deployment with the U.S. Fifth Fleet.

On 8 October 2008, Carrier Strike Group Nine completed its 2008 deployment when the strike group arrived at Naval Base San Diego, California, and its flagship, the carrier Abraham Lincoln arriving back at its homeport of Naval Station Everett, Washington, on 12 October 2006.

2008 deployment force composition

CARSTRKGRU 9 Warships	Carrier Air Wing Two (CVW-2) squadrons embarked aboard flagship USS Abraham Lincoln (CVN-72)	
USS Mobile Bay (CG-53)	Strike Fighter Squadron 151 (VFA-151): 10 F/A-18C(N)	Carrier Airborne Early Warning Squadron (VAW-116): 4 E-2C 2000 NP
USS Momsen (DDG-92)	Strike Fighter Squadron 137 (VFA-137): 12 F/A-18E	Helicopter Anti-Submarine Squadron 2 (HS-2): 7 SH-60F/HH-60H
USS Russell (DDG-59)	Strike Fighter Squadron 34 (VFA-34): 12 FA-18C(N)	Fleet Logistics Support Squadron 30 (VRC-30), Det. 2: 2 C-2A
USS Curts (FFG-38)	Strike Fighter Squadron 2 (VFA-2):: 12 F/A-18F	Helicopter Antisubmarine Squadron Light 47 (HSL-47): 7 SH-60B
USNS Rainier (T-AOE-7)	Tactical Electronics Warfare Squadron 131 (VAQ-131): 5 EA-6B	——

2008 deployment exercises and port visits

Number	Regional Exercises				Port Visits		Notes
Number	Duration	U.S. Force	Bilateral/Multilateral Partner(s)	Operating Area	Location	Dates	Notes
1st:	15 April 2008	Carrier Strike Group Nine	PASSEX: Republic of Singapore Navy (RSN)	Strait of Malacca	Singapore	16–20 Apr 2008	
2nd:	——	USS Momsen (DDG-92)	——	——	Muara, Brunei	17–20 Apr 2006	
3rd:	——	USS Curts (FFG-38)	——	——	Lumut, Malaysia	18–22 Apr 2008	
4th:	11–21 May 2008	USS Curts (FFG-38)	Exercise Inspired Union: Pakistani Navy (PN) (Note: Pakistani forces included PNS Badr (D 184), PNS Shahjahan (D 186), PNS Nasr (A-47), and Pakistan Air Force Explosive Ordnance Disposal team participated along with USS Curts (FFG-38); USS Ross (DDG 71); members of Destroyer Squadron 50; and Combined Task Forces 54, 55, and 57.)	North Arabian Sea	——	——	
5th:	17–21 May 2008	USS Russell (DDG-59)	Exercise KhunjarHaad (Note: USS Russell, the French frigate FS Surcouf (F 711), the British frigate HMS Montrose (F236), the British fleet replenishment tanker RFA Wave Knight (A389), and four other coalition ships conducted air defense; surface warfare operation; visit, board, search and seizure (VBSS); and joint gunnery exercises, which focused on joint interoperability training and proficiency.)	Gulf of Oman	——	——	
6th:	——	USS Momsen (DDG-92)	——	——	Limassol, Cyprus	25–27 Jul 2008	

=== 2009 operations ===
On 5 February 2009, Destroyer Squadron Nine (DESRON-9) completed its Naval Surface Fire Support re-certification off the coast of San Clemente Island, California. NSFS exercises involved destroyers and cruisers firing their deck guns in support of ground troops ashore, and its certification allowed destroyers and cruisers to provide naval gunfire support for ground forces operating ashore while under enemy fire. These exercise began in January 2009 with the Expeditionary Warfare Training Group Pacific monitoring the ships' firing teams during a live-fire exercises in a variety of combat scenarios. Naval Surface Fire Support (NSFS) re-certification is a key milestone for DESRON-9's for its pre-deployment Sustainment Exercise training cycle.

The guided-missile cruiser Mobile Bay, the guided-missile destroyer Shoup, and the guided-missile frigates Ingraham and Rodney M. Davis subsequently hosted more than 40 first class and second class midshipmen from the U.S. Naval Academy and Reserve Officer Training Corps programs from colleges across the United States as part of the midshipman summer training program. Also, on 20 July 2009, the guided-missile destroyer Momsen joined Shoup, Ingraham, and Rodney M. Davis in three-day training maneuvers off the coast of Washington.

== Notes ==
Footnotes

Citations

== Sources ==
- Daniels, Lieutenant Commander John M. (31 December 2004). "2004 Command History: USS Abraham Lincoln CVN-72" (PDF). Washington Navy Yard: Naval History & Heritage Command. Archived from the original (PDF) on 31 January 2012. "Lieutenant Commander J.M. Danield was the Public Affairs Officer (PAO) of the USS Abraham Lincoln (CVN-72)"
- Morison, Samuel Loring (May 2008). "U.S. Naval Battle Force Changes 1 January 2008–31 December 2008". Naval Institute Proceedings. 135 (5): 108–120. ISSN 0041-798X. "(Subscription required.)"
- —— (May 2009). "U.S. Naval Battle Force Changes 1 January 2009–31 December 2009: Aircraft Carrier Air Wing Assignments and Composition as of 1 March 2010". Naval Institute Proceedings. 136 (5): 106–116. ISSN 0041-798X. "(Subscription required.)"
