= Sikorsky H-60 =

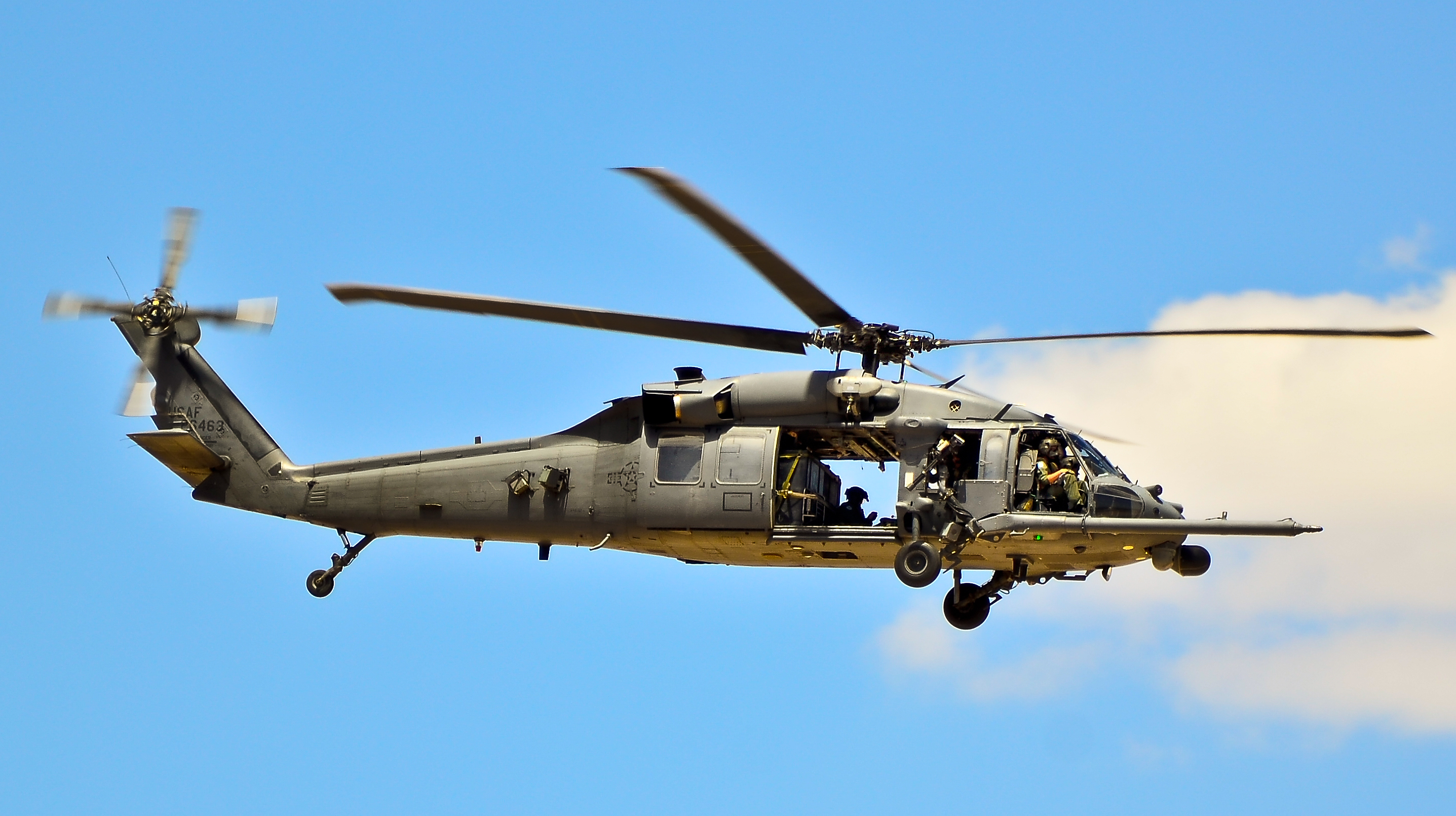
United States Air Force HH-60G Pave Hawk

The Sikorsky H-60 is a family of military helicopters built by Sikorsky Aircraft.

All models use a modified mission symbol in addition to the 'H' vehicle type designator under the 1962 United States Tri-Service aircraft designation system (meaning, there is no aircraft named an "H-60" per se). The mission prefix (e.g. U, M, V) only has tangential meaning to the suffix series letter (A/B/C etc.), as most modified mission types encompass multiple series letters. Sikorsky also sells this helicopter as the S-70, but it was initially developed as the UH-60 to specific United States Army project requirements.

Variants include:

- Sikorsky UH-60 Black Hawk, a medium-lift utility helicopter introduced in 1979.
- Sikorsky SH-60 Seahawk, a multi-mission maritime helicopter used by the United States Navy.
  - Sikorsky SH-60F Oceanhawk, a variant for antisubmarine warfare.
  - Sikorsky MH-60S Knighthawk, a variant for troop transport and vertical replenishment, but can also perform search and rescue.
- Sikorsky HH-60G Pave Hawk, a United States Air Force variant for combat search and rescue.
  - Sikorsky HH-60H Rescue Hawk, maritime special operations, search and rescue model for the U.S. Navy.
- Sikorsky MH-60T Jayhawk, a variant used by the United States Coast Guard for maritime patrol, interdiction, and search and rescue (upgraded from extant HH-60J Jayhawk aircraft beginning in 2007).
- Sikorsky VH-60N White Hawk, a variant used by the United States Marine Corps as presidential and VIP transport helicopter including Marine One.
- Mitsubishi H-60, manufactured in Japan by Mitsubishi under license from Sikorsky
