= VAW-116 =

US Navy Command and Control Squadron

Carrier Airborne Early Warning Squadron 116
- VAW-116 Insignia
- Active: 20 April 1967 - Present
- Country: United States
- Branch: United States Navy
- Type: Airborne Early Warning (VAW)
- Role: Airborne Early Warning; Airborne Battle Management; Command and Control
- Part of: Carrier Air Wing 7
- Garrison/HQ: Naval Base Ventura County
- Nickname: Sun Kings
- Motto: LEAD THE WAY!
- Colors: Maroon and Gold
- Mascot: Elvis Presley
- Engagements: Vietnam War; Iranian hostage crisis Operation Earnest Will; Gulf War; Operation Southern Watch; Operation Noble Eagle; Iraq War; Operation Enduring Freedom; Operation Inherent Resolve; Operation Epic Fury

Aircraft flown
- Electronic warfare: E-2C Hawkeye

Airborne Command & Control Squadron 116 (VAW-116) is a US Navy Command and Control Squadron that deploys aboard the USS George H.W. Bush as part of Carrier Air Wing Seven, flying the E-2C Hawkeye 2000 aircraft. VAW-116 is stationed at Naval Base Ventura County under the cognizance of Commander, Airborne Command Control and Logistics Wing (COMACCLOGWING). The current commanding officer is Commander Phillip J. Sheridan.

== Squadron history ==
=== 1960s ===
VAW-116 was established on 20 April 1967, equipped with the E-2A Hawkeye. The squadron completed three Far-East deployments as part of Attack Carrier Air Wing Fifteen and two while attached to Attack Carrier Air Wing Nine.

=== 1970s ===
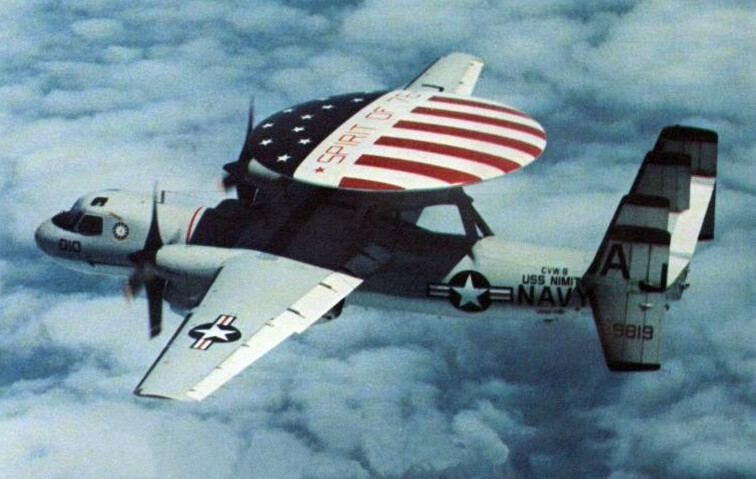
VAW-116 E-2B in 1976 bicentennial markings

VAW 116 transitioned to the E-2B from July 1970 to the 1971 deployment with CVW 9 on USS Constellation. In July 1975, VAW-116 transferred to Attack Carrier Air Wing Eight. Concurrently, the west-coast VAW community, including VAW-116, moved from NAS North Island to NAS Miramar. Reassigned to Carrier Air Wing Eight, the squadron saw duty in the North Atlantic in 1975. In 1976 VAW-116 embarked on USS Nimitz for a Mediterranean deployment. The squadron transferred to Carrier Air Wing 17 then embarked on USS Forrestal in 1977 and deployed to the Mediterranean and North Atlantic in March 1978. During 1979–1980,

=== 1980s ===
VAW-116 transitioned to the E-2C and made a Western Pacific/Indian Ocean deployment from 26 February 1980 to 15 October 1980, aboard USS Constellation in support of Iranian Contingency Operations. The squadron was assigned to Carrier Air Wing TWO in July 1981. On 7 April 1982, the squadron embarked on USS Ranger for a Western Pacific/Indian Ocean deployment. Returning in October 1982, the squadron remained with Carrier Air Wing Two aboard USS Kitty Hawk, deploying on 13 January 1984. In July 1987, the squadron deployed aboard USS Ranger for a six-month Western Pacific/Indian Ocean deployment providing support for Operation Earnest Will in the Persian Gulf. On 24 February 1989, the squadron deployed aboard USS Ranger to the Western Pacific and the Indian Ocean, supporting operations with the Oman Air Force and Royal Thai Air Force. VAW-116 sailed aboard USS Ranger on 8 December 1990, to the Western Pacific in support of Operations Desert Shield and Desert Storm. During Operation Desert Storm the squadron flew 1,364 total flight hours and spent 93 days on station in the Persian Gulf.

=== 1990s ===
The squadron returned on 31 January 1993, from a Western Pacific deployment in support of Operation Southern Watch in Iraq and Operation Restore Hope in Somalia, winning the Battle Efficiency "E" Award for 1992. In February 1993, the squadron commenced a transition from the E-2C Group 0 to the E-2C Group II aircraft. The Group II weapons system represented a tremendous advancement in avionics, communications, propulsion, and navigation systems. In May 1993, VAW-116 deployed to Panama in support of JTF-4 Joint Task Force Four Operations. Upon returning, the squadron was awarded the AEW Excellence Award for 1992, recognizing them as the premier VAW Squadron for the entire E-2C community. In November 1993, VAW-116 commenced a work-up cycle at NAS Fallon, Nevada. This cycle included RIMPAC 94, in which Carrier Air Wing Two conducted joint operations with five other nations, and culminated in Fleet exercises during August/September 1994.

On 10 November 1994, the Squadron embarked on USS Constellation on a Western Pacific and the Persian Gulf deployment. The squadron provided AEW and Battle Group coverage off the coast of North Korea and supported Operation Southern Watch over Iraq. In June 1995 and February 1996, the squadron deployed to conduct surveillance operations at NS Roosevelt Roads, in support of Joint Interagency Task Force East (JIATF-EAST). On 1 April 1997, the squadron embarked on USS Constellation for a Western Pacific and the Persian Gulf deployment. During the six-month deployment, the squadron provided surveillance of Iraq as part of Operation Southern Watch. In addition, the squadron participated in military exercises with the Pakistan Air Force. In February and March 1998 the squadron again deployed to NS Roosevelt Roads, to conduct counter-narcotics surveillance operations in support of JIATF-EAST. On 18 June 1999, the Squadron embarked on USS Constellation for a Western Pacific/Persian Gulf deployment. During the next six months, VAW-116 provided surveillance of Iraq in support of Operation Southern Watch. After this deployment, the squadron was awarded the 1999 Chief of Naval Operations Safety "S".

=== 2000s ===
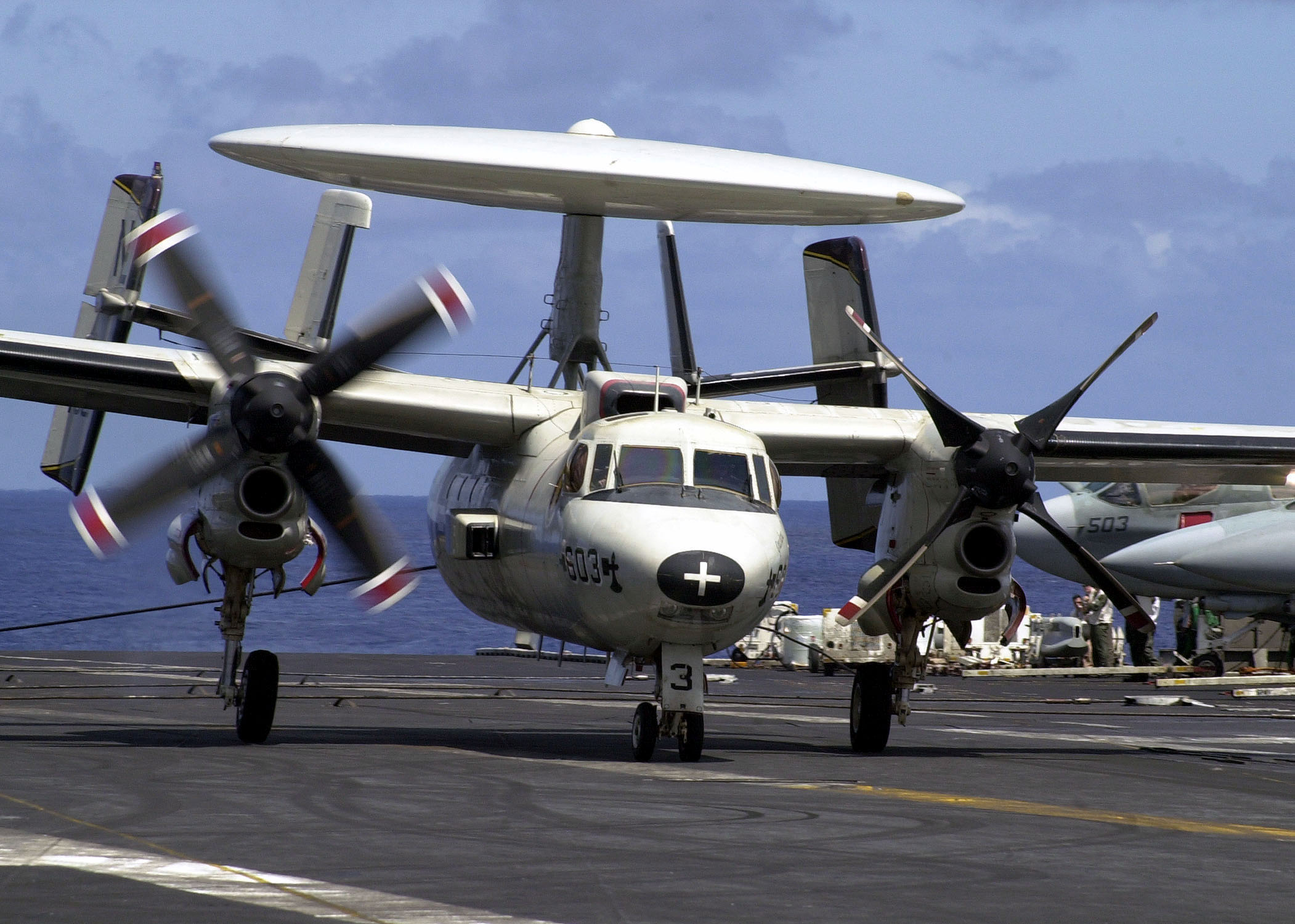
VAW-116 E-2C lands aboard USS Constellation

In January 2000, the squadron deployed again to conduct surveillance operations at NS Roosevelt Roads in Support of JIATF-EAST.

The squadron deployed aboard USS Constellation to the Western Pacific and the Persian Gulf from 15 March 2001 to 15 September 2001, providing an airborne early warning for Operation Southern Watch over Iraq. The squadron deployed to NAS Norfolk in support of Operation Noble Eagle. During this operation, they assisted in providing continual airborne early warning coverage over the East Coast as a result of the September 11 attacks.

VAW-116 embarked on USS Constellation to the Western Pacific and the Persian Gulf in October 2002. The squadron flew extensive Airborne Battlefield Command and Control missions in support of the U.S. Army V Corps and the U.S. Marine Corps II MEF's invasion of Iraq and advance on Baghdad during the initial weeks of Operation Iraqi Freedom.

In November 2003, the squadron began transitioning to the E-2C Hawkeye 2000 airframe. VAW-116 completed the transition in August 2004 with the delivery of the squadron's fourth and final aircraft. The squadron embarked on USS Abraham Lincoln in October 2004, to execute a surge deployment to the Western Pacific. They completed Integrated Warfare Training in the vicinity of Hawaii before transiting west. Their deployment was extended when the Abraham Lincoln Carrier Strike Group was called to assist in Operation Unified Assistance in Banda Aceh, Indonesia as a result of the 2004 Indian Ocean earthquake and tsunami. The squadron aided in the effort by sending Sailors ashore to distribute much-needed food and medical aid to the wounded disaster victims.

The squadron returned to sea in March 2006 on a Western Pacific deployment in support of exercises Foal Eagle, Valiant Shield and RIMPAC 2006. Upon their return from deployment in 2006, the squadron upgraded their aircraft with the eight-bladed New Propeller 2000 system (NP2K). This upgrade was completed in March 2007, just after the squadron returned from detachment to NAS Fallon. In May 2007, the squadron completed NP2K carrier qualification aboard USS Harry S. Truman off the Virginia Coast. In March 2008, the squadron embarked on a seven-month deployment with Carrier Air Wing Two aboard USS Abraham Lincoln to the U.S. Fifth Fleet Area of Responsibility (AOR) where they flew 266 combat missions in support of Operation Iraqi Freedom in Iraq and Enduring Freedom in Afghanistan.

In March 2008, the squadron embarked with Carrier Air Wing Two aboard USS Abraham Lincoln for deployment to the U.S. Fifth Fleet Area of Responsibility. They participated in Operations Iraqi Freedom and Enduring Freedom and provided tanker and airspace management for strike and support aircraft. During the deployment, the squadron earned the CVW-2 Deployment Top Hook award and the Chief's Mess was presented the Broadsword Award for the best CPO Mess in CVW-2. They returned home in October 2008.

=== 2010s ===
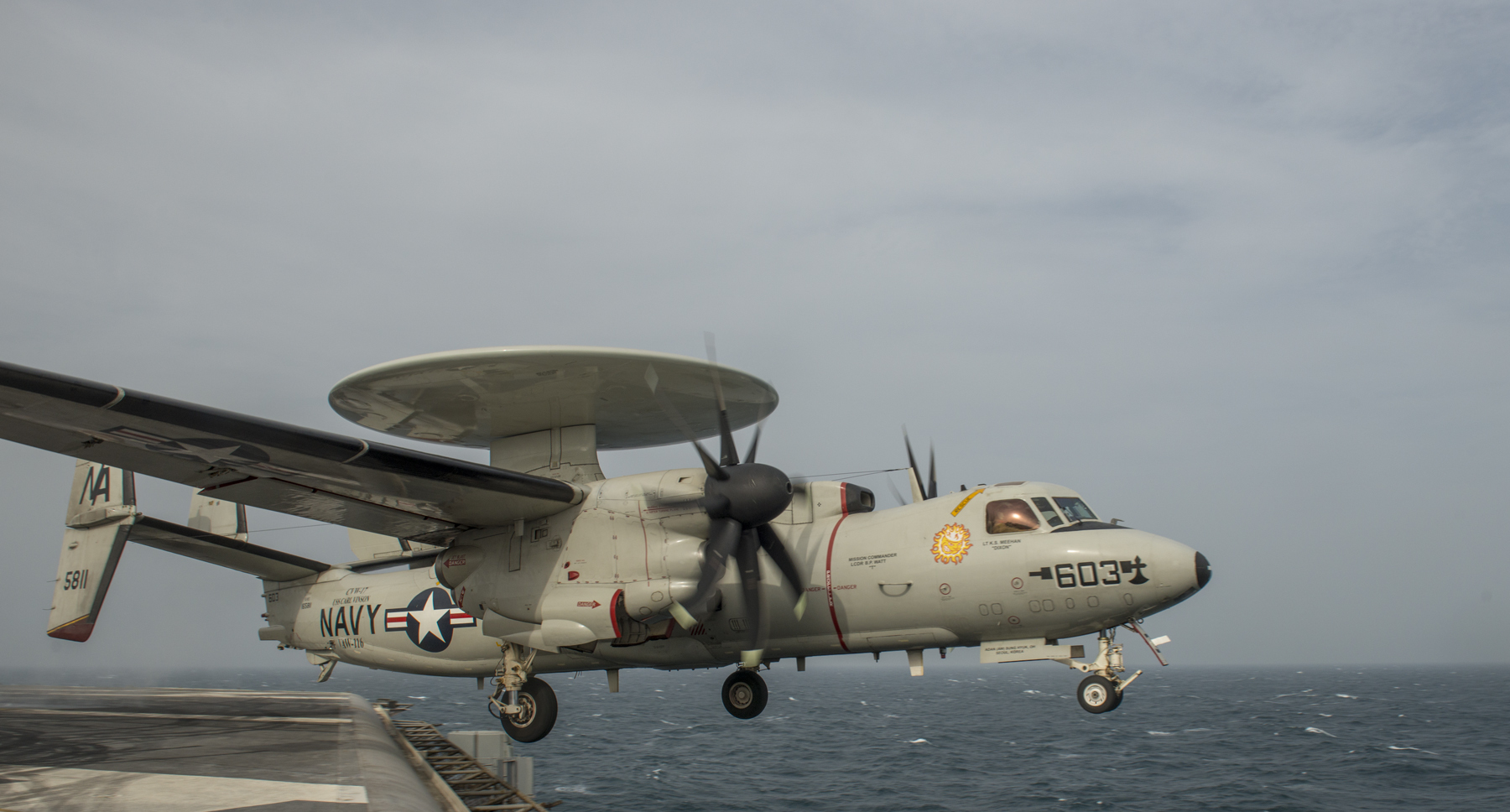
VAW-116 E-2C launches from USS Carl Vinson during Operation Inherent Resolve

The squadron once again deployed with Carrier Air Wing Two aboard USS Abraham Lincoln on 11 September 2010, for a 6-month cruise to the 5th Fleet AOR. The squadron supported Operation Enduring Freedom in Afghanistan and Operation New Dawn in Iraq until they returned home in March 2011. In April and May 2011 the squadron transitioned to the E-2C CNS/ATM Hawkeye 2000 all-glass cockpit variant of the E-2C. In December 2011 Carrier Air Wing Two and VAW-116 once again deployed on USS Abraham Lincoln for an eight-month around the world deployment to the Fifth Fleet AOR in direct support of Operation Enduring Freedom. On 17 July 2012, USS Abraham Lincoln transited through the Suez Canal on their way home to the United States; the deployment concluded on 3 August 2012, when the squadron flew 4 aircraft from USS Abraham Lincoln off the Virginia coast back to NAS Point Mugu. In October 2012 VAW-116 joined Carrier Air Wing 17 as a member of Carrier Strike Group One attached to USS Carl Vinson.

From October 2014 to March 2015, the squadron was deployed along with the USS Carl Vinson battle group and assisted with Operation Inherent Resolve to assist with military intervention against the Islamic State of Iraq and the Levant (ISIL).

The squadron returned home in April 2015.

=== 2020s ===
In late April 2026, VAW-116, as part of CVW 7 onboard the George H. W. Bush entered the CENTCOM AOR. VAW’s E-2Cs began combat operations against Iran and undertook naval blockade sorties within Operation Epic Fury.

== Popular culture ==
VAW-116 became "semi-famous" in 2006 for its remake of the "Pump It" music video, by The Black Eyed Peas. The video originated as a project on board ship to fight off boredom and to boost morale but stemmed into what is almost a full-fledged production and a free recruiting ad for the Navy, recording over 4,000,000 views on YouTube. The crew has since recorded two more video remakes - Outkast's video "Hey Ya!," which included every single member of the Sun Kings and "Move Along" - both of which have recorded over a million viewers. "Pump It" and "Hey Ya!" have been shown on national television and news stations in other countries.

== Insignia ==
The VAW-116 insignia consists of a solid maroon circle behind a white and gold sun with a fasces in the center, above a gold banner with "VAW-116" written on it in maroon.

== See also ==
- History of the United States Navy
- List of United States Navy aircraft squadrons
