= VAQ-131 =

Electronic Attack Squadron 131
- Active: 1 February 1946 - Present (79 years, 10 months)
- Country: United States
- Branch: United States Navy
- Type: Electronic Attack
- Role: Electronic Warfare
- Part of: Electronic Attack Wing Pacific
- Garrison/HQ: NAS Whidbey Island
- Nickname: Lancers
- Motto: Tip of the Spear / We protect the Fleet.
- Colors: #2a2e60 #fac72d
- Mascot: Spartan
- Engagements: Iran hostage crisis Multinational Force in Lebanon; Operation Urgent Fury; Operation Quick Force; Operation Restore Hope; Operation Southern Watch; Operation Unified Assistance; Operation Iraqi Freedom; Operation Enduring Freedom; Operation New Dawn; Operation Inherent Resolve
- Decorations: Prowler Squadron of the Year Award
- Website: https://www.airpac.navy.mil/Organization/Electronic-Attack-Squadron-VAQ-131/

Commanders
- Commanding Officer: CDR. James C. Jordan
- Executive Officer: CDR. Kyle D. Hanford
- Command Master Chief: CMDCM. Andrew J. Jenkins

Insignia
- Callsign: PILUM
- Modex: 55X
- Tail Code: NL

Aircraft flown
- Bomber: KA/A-3B Skywarrior (1956-1968)
- Electronic warfare: EKA-3B Skywarrior (1968-1971); EA-6B Prowler(1971-2014); EA-18G Growler(2014-Present)
- Patrol: P2V Neptune (1946-1956)

Electronic Attack Squadron 131 (VAQ-131), also known as the "Lancers," is a United States Navy tactical jet aircraft squadron specializing in kinetic and non-kinetic Suppression of Enemy Air Defenses (SEAD). They are based at Naval Air Station Whidbey Island, flying the EA-18G Growler. Their radio callsign is "Pilum."

== History ==
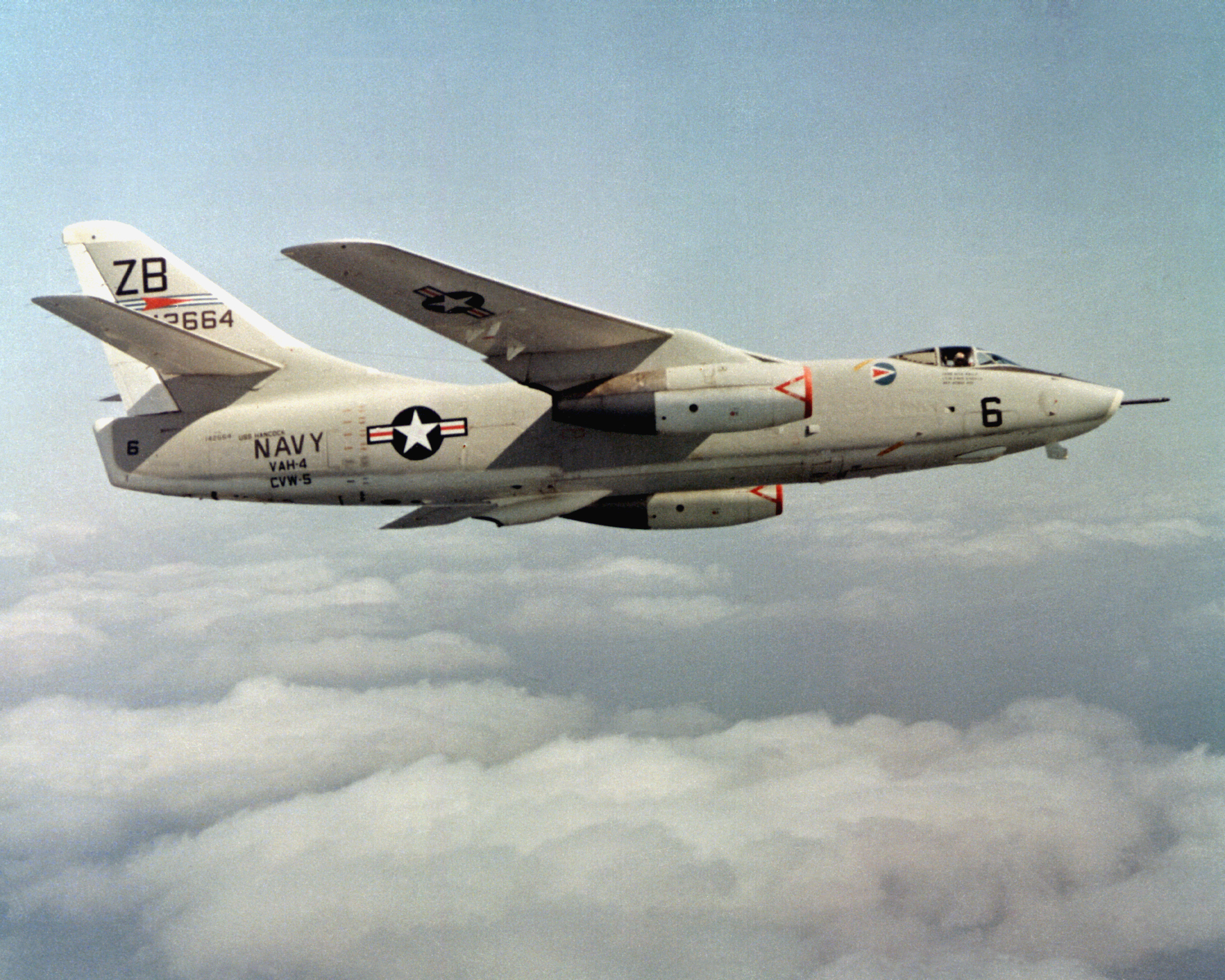
VAH-4 KA-3B in 1967

=== VP-931 ===
VAQ-131 was originally established as Patrol Squadron 931 (VP-931). From 1946 through 1955, VP-931 flew the P2V Neptune.

=== VAH-4 ===
In 1956, the squadron transitioned to the A-3 Skywarrior and was redesignated as Heavy Attack Squadron 4 (VAH-4).

During the Vietnam War detachments from VAH-4 were deployed on the following aircraft carriers operating on Yankee and Dixie Stations:

- 1 August 1963 – 10 March 1964, Detachment G A-3Bs were embarked on USS Oriskany for a Western Pacific deployment
- 28 January-21 November 1964, Detachment E A-3Bs were embarked on USS Bon Homme Richard
- 21 October 1964 – 29 May 1965, Detachment L A-3Bs were embarked on USS Hancock
- 10 May-13 December 1965, Detachment 62 A-3Bs were embarked on USS Independence
- 28 September 1965 – 13 May 1966, Detachment B A-3Bs were embarked on USS Ticonderoga
- 19 October 1965 – 13 June 1966, Detachment C A-3Bs were embarked on USS Kitty Hawk On 12 April 1966 the People's Republic of China claimed to have shot down a U.S. aircraft over the Leizhou Peninsula. The aircraft was identified as being squadron KA-3B #142653 which disappeared en route from Naval Air Station Cubi Point to the Kitty Hawk with four crewmen onboard.
- 26 October 1965 – 21 June 1966, Detachment M A-3Bs were embarked on USS Enterprise
- 29 May-16 November 1966, Detachment G A-3Bs were embarked on USS Oriskany
- 15 October 1966 – 29 May 1967, Detachment E A-3Bs were embarked on USS Ticonderoga
- 5 November 1966 – 19 June 1967, Detachment C KA-3Bs were embarked on USS Kitty Hawk
- 5 January-22 July 1967, Detachment B A-3Bs were embarked on USS Hancock
- 26 January-25 August 1967, Detachment 31 A-3Bs were embarked on USS Bon Homme Richard
- 16 June 1967 – 31 January 1968, Detachment G/34 KA-3Bs were embarked on USS Oriskany
- 18 November 1967 – 28 June 1968, Detachment 63 KA-3Bs were embarked on USS Kitty Hawk
- 28 December 1967 – 17 August 1968, Detachment 14 KA-3Bs were embarked on USS Ticonderoga

In addition to the carrier deployments, in 1966 a detachment of KA-3Bs was also sent to operate from NAS Cubi Point and Da Nang Air Base.

=== VAQ-131 ===
VAQ-131 EA-6B prepares to launch from USS Ronald Reagan in 2013

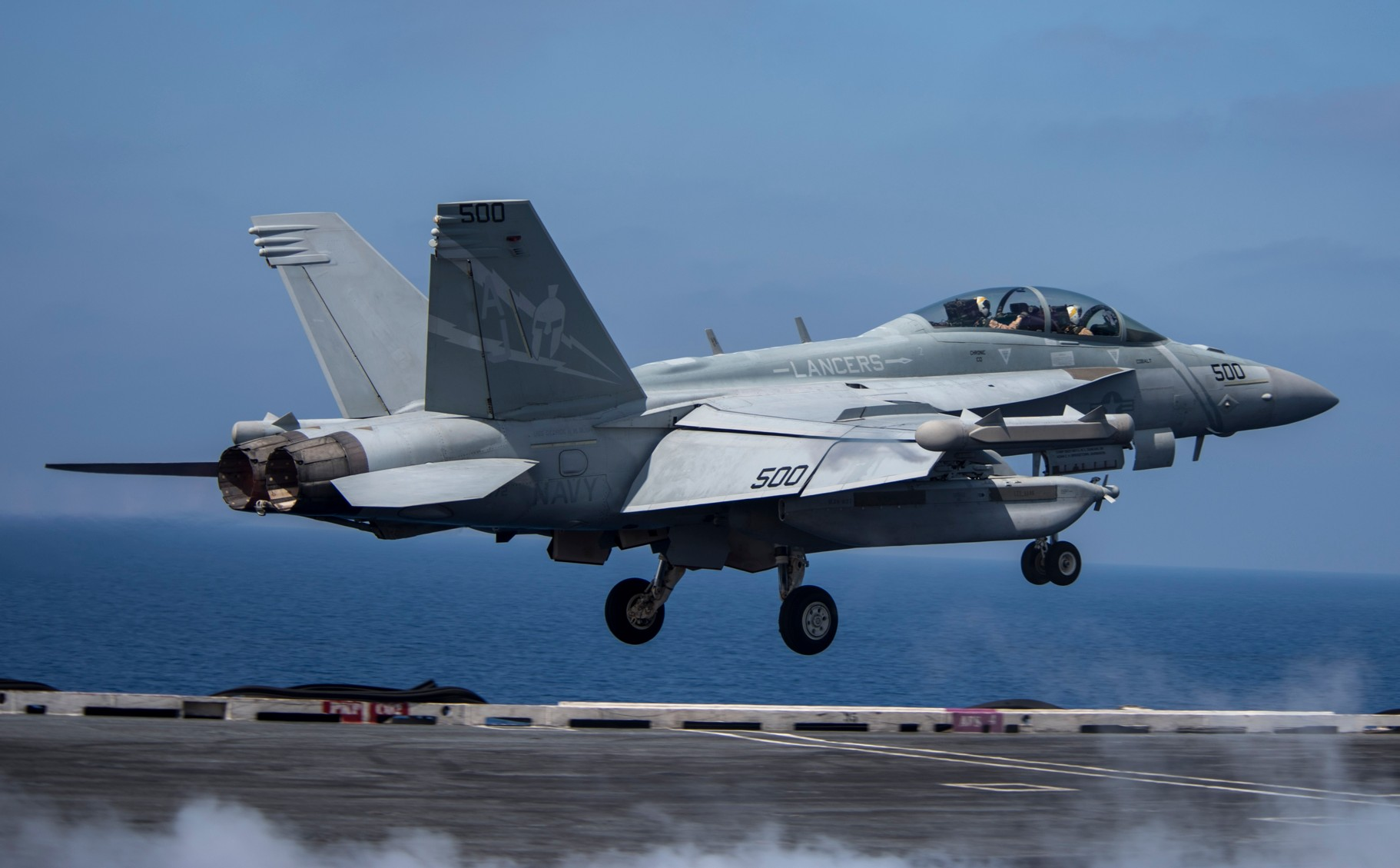
VAQ-131 EA-18G Growler launching from USS George H. W. Bush in 2017

In November 1968, VAH-4 received the EKA-3 version of the Skywarrior and was redesignated as Tactical Electronic Warfare Squadron 131 (VAQ-131). In 1971, they became the second squadron in the U.S. Navy to receive the Standard version of the EA-6B Prowler. The squadron transitioned to the Expanded Capability (EXCAP) version of the Prowler in 1976, to the Improved Capablility (ICAP) Prowler in 1978, and to the ICAP II Prowler in 1984. In May 2014, they transitioned to the Boeing EA-18G Growler, which they currently operate. The EA-18G expanded the squadron's capabilities to enable more effective prosecution of radar and Surface-to-Air Missile (SAM) sites in an Integrated Air Defense System (IADS), both through air-to-ground weapon employment and precision electronic attack, the latter being the Growler's niche capability. The EA-18G is also a capable air-to-air combat platform.

== Home port assignments ==
The squadron was assigned to these home ports:

- NAS Whidbey Island

== Aircraft assignment ==
- P-2V Neptune
- A-3B/KA-3B/EKA-3 Skywarrior
- EA-6B Prowler
- EA-18G Growler

== See also ==
- History of the United States Navy
- List of United States Navy aircraft squadrons
