= USS Mobile Bay =

American guided-missile cruiser (1987–2023)

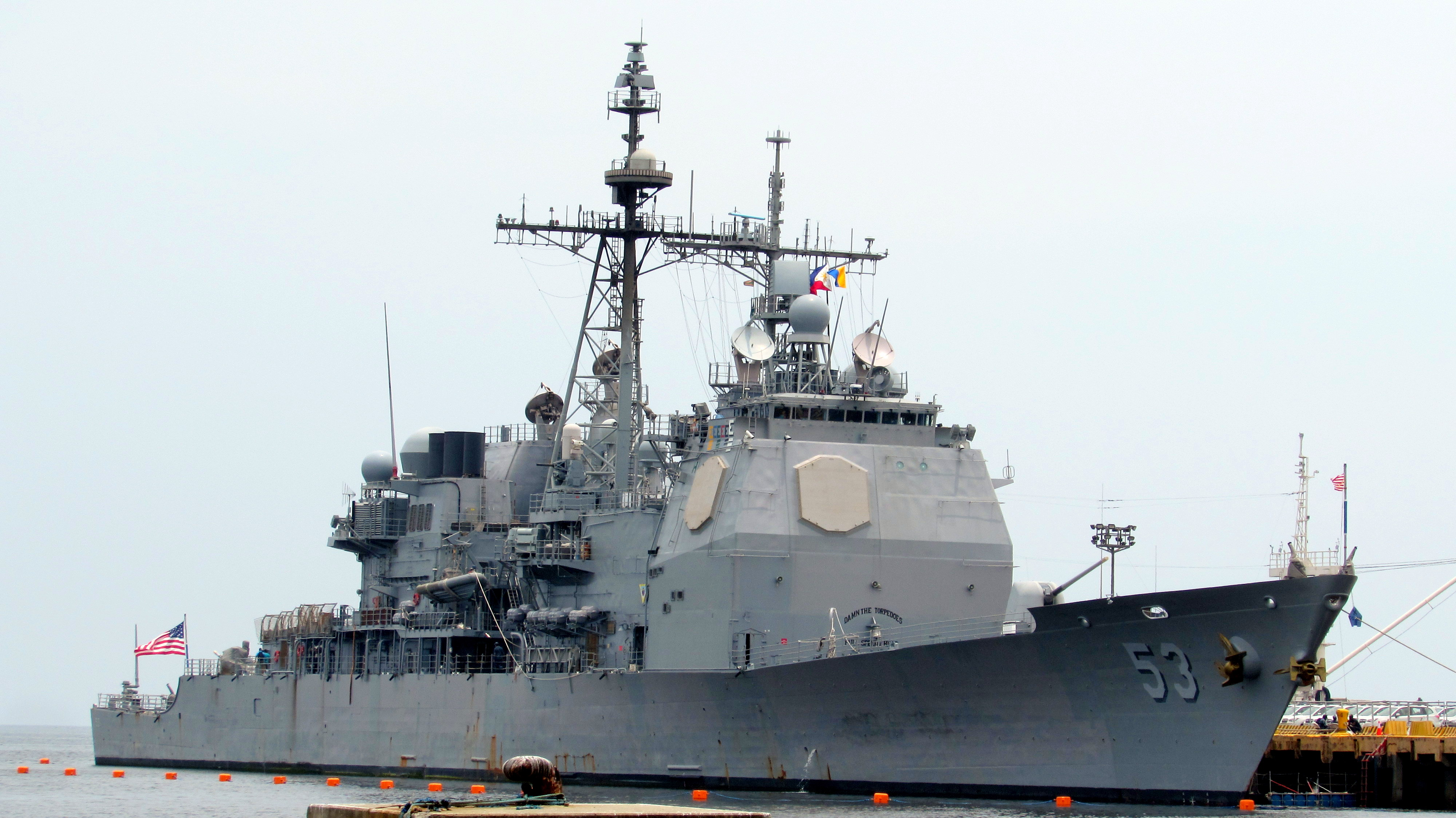
- USS Mobile Bay on 22 May 2016

History

United States
- Name: Mobile Bay
- Namesake: Battle of Mobile Bay
- Ordered: 15 January 1982
- Builder: Ingalls Shipbuilding
- Laid down: 6 June 1984
- Launched: 22 August 1985
- Commissioned: 21 February 1987
- Decommissioned: 10 August 2023
- Stricken: 18 August 2023
- Identification: Call sign: NMOB; Hull number: CG-53
- Motto: Full Speed Ahead
- Fate: Sunk as target 12 July 2026
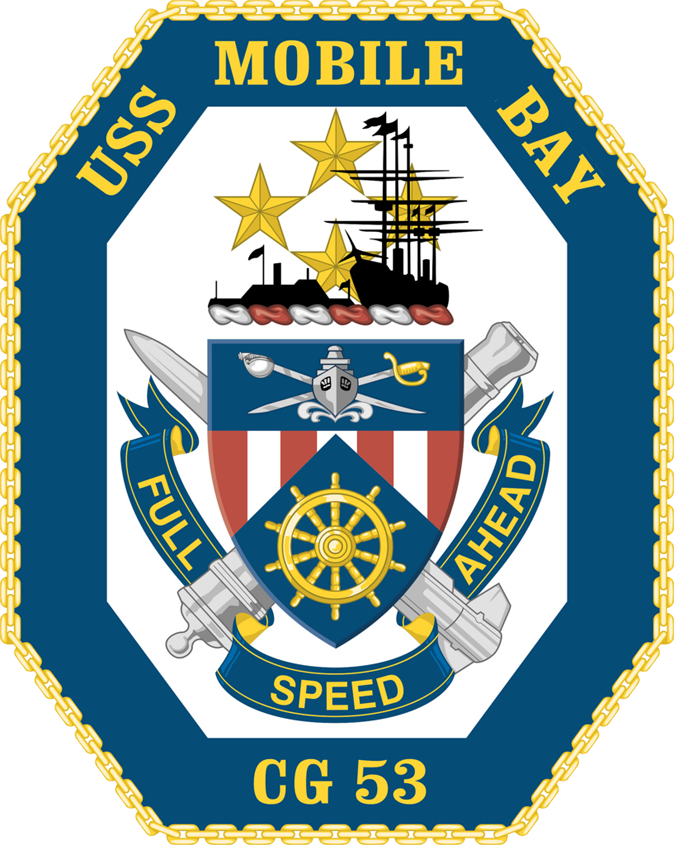
- Badge

General characteristics
- Class & type: Ticonderoga-class cruiser
- Displacement: Approx. 9,600 long tons (9,800 t) full load
- Length: 567 feet (173 m)
- Beam: 55 feet (16.8 meters)
- Draft: 34 feet (10.2 meters)
- Propulsion: 4 × General Electric LM2500 gas turbine engines; 2 × controllable-reversible pitch propellers; 2 × rudders
- Speed: 32.5 knots (60 km/h; 37.4 mph)
- Complement: 30 officers and 300 enlisted
- Sensors & processing systems: AN/SPY-1A/B multi-function radar; AN/SPS-49 air search radar (Removed on some ships); AN/SPG-62 fire control radar; AN/SPS-73 surface search radar; AN/SPQ-9 gun fire control radar; AN/SQQ-89(V)1/3 - A(V)15 Sonar suite, consisting of: AN/SQS-53B/C/D active sonar; AN/SQR-19 TACTAS, AN/SQR-19B ITASS, & MFTA passive sonar; AN/SQQ-28 light airborne multi-purpose system
- Armament: 2 × 61 cell Mk 41 vertical launch systems containing; 122 × mix of: RIM-66M-5 Standard SM-2MR Block IIIB; RIM-156A SM-2ER Block IV; RIM-161 SM-3; RIM-162A ESSM; RIM-174A Standard ERAM; BGM-109 Tomahawk; RUM-139A VL-ASROC; 8 × RGM-84 Harpoon missiles; 2 × 5 in (127 mm)/62 caliber Mark 45 Mod 4 lightweight gun; 2 × Mk 38 25 mm Machine Gun Systems; 2–4 × .50 in (12.7 mm) cal. machine gun; 2 × Phalanx CIWS Block 1B; 2 × Mk 32 12.75 in (324 mm) triple torpedo tubes
- Aircraft carried: 2 × MH-60R Seahawk LAMPS Mk III helicopters.

USS Mobile Bay (CG-53) was a Ticonderoga-class guided-missile cruiser that served in the United States Navy from 1987 to 2023. She was named for the naval Battle of Mobile Bay during the American Civil War in 1864.

== Design and construction ==
The ship was ordered from Ingalls Shipbuilding on 15 January 1982. She was laid down on 6 June 1984, launched on 22 August 1985, and commissioned on 21 February 1987 at the Alabama State Docks in Mobile, Alabama. She was decommissioned August 10, 2023.

With guided missiles and rapid-fire cannons, Mobile Bay was capable of defeating threats in the air, on the sea, on shore, and undersea. She carried the Tomahawk Land Attack Missile which played an integral part in the strikes on Iraqi targets during the opening stages of Operation Iraqi Freedom in 2003. She also carried two Seahawk LAMPS multi-purpose helicopters, mainly for anti-submarine warfare (ASW). The primary detachment associated with the early history of the USS Mobile Bay (CG-53) was HSL-44 (Helicopter Anti-Submarine Squadron Light 44) Detachment Seven. The ship was capable of conducting Maritime Interdiction Operations, and carried a fully trained boarding team.

== Operational history ==
After commissioning, Mobile Bay joined the U.S. Atlantic Fleet, arriving at Mayport, Florida, her homeport in March 1987. Following a year of crew qualifications, tests and systems trials, Mobile Bay embarked on her maiden deployment on 11 May 1989. During this cruise, Mobile Bay earned her first two awards: the Sea Service Deployment Ribbon and the Armed Forces Expeditionary Medal, for operations conducted in the Gulf of Oman.

In June 1990, Mobile Bay shifted homeports from Mayport to Yokosuka, Japan. Shortly thereafter, she deployed in August 1990 in support of Operation Desert Shield and Operation Desert Storm, becoming the first AEGIS cruiser to circumnavigate the globe. In the Persian Gulf, the ship distinguished herself by becoming the first Battle Force Anti-Air Warfare Commander to control a four-carrier Task Force. Mobile Bay launched 22 Tomahawk land-attack cruise missile strikes, and performed as the Battle Force Anti-Surface Warfare Commander targeting Iraqi naval vessels and directing carrier-launched attack aircraft to destroy 38 Iraqi naval vessels resulting in the complete neutralization of the Iraqi Navy. Helicopter Anti-Submarine Squadron Light 43 (HSL-43) Detachment 2B was assigned with two SH-60B Seahawk helicopters aboard.

In February 1991, the Tactical Information Coordinator (TIC) aboard Mobile Bay, reported SPY-1 Radar acquisitions of what appeared to be SCUD missile launches that were detected over Saudi Arabia. These tracks were reported over Data Systems Administration (DSA) and Anti-Air Warfare Coordination and Reporting (AAWC&R) voice networks and were confirmed to be valid targets by Patriot Batteries who engaged these SCUDs.

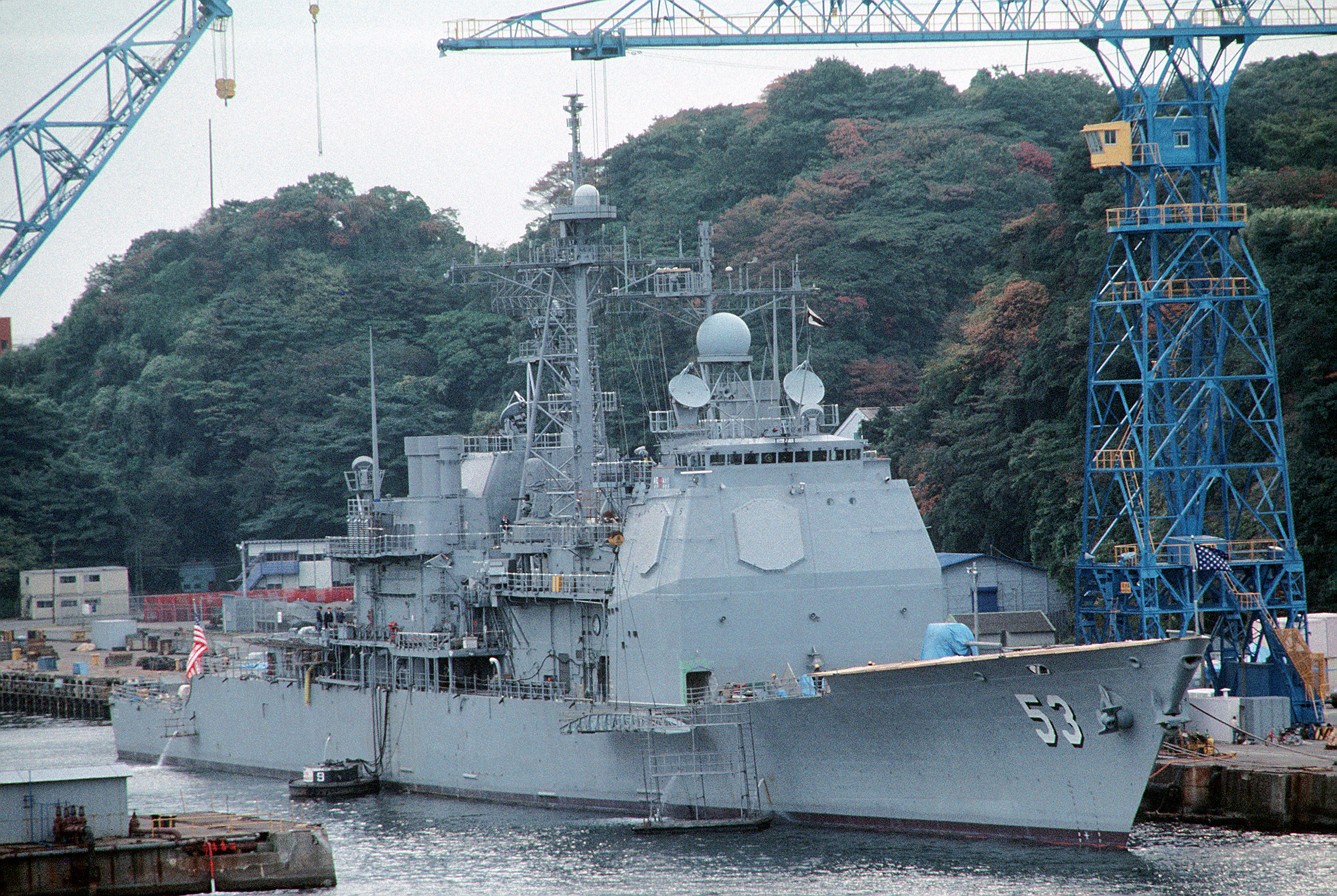
Mobile Bay in Yokosuka, December 1991

In May 1991, Mobile Bay was ordered to Subic Bay, Republic of the Philippines, to participate in Operation Fiery Vigil, the evacuation of thousands of people displaced by the volcanic eruption of Mount Pinatubo. In December 1991, Mobile Bay began work-ups for a spring 1992 Persian Gulf deployment.

On 15 April 1992, Mobile Bay once again set sail for the Persian Gulf. En route, the ship and crew visited Sydney, Australia, to represent the U. S. Navy at the 50th Anniversary celebration of the Battle of Coral Sea. Sailing through the Straits of Hormuz in late May 1992, the ship began duties as the Persian Gulf Anti-Air Warfare Commander. Mobile Bay also played a vital role in Operation Southern Watch, the enforcement of the U. N.-mandated "No Fly Zone" over Southern Iraq. Returning to Japan in October, Mobile Bay participated in ANNUALEX-92, a major naval exercise involving units of the U. S. Navy and the Japanese Maritime Self Defense Force. Mobile Bay served as the Anti-Air Warfare Commander for a joint U. S. - Japanese flotilla.

After participating in SPRING TRAINING-93 off the coast of Australia, she made an historic visit to the Russian seaport of Vladivostok in September 1993. Accompanying her was the USS Bunker Hill.

Mobile Bay was deployed to East Timor as part of the Australian-led INTERFET peacekeeping taskforce from 20 September to 5 October 1999. As the most capable air defense vessel available, the ship was placed in charge of air defence, although the U.S. requests for screening Mobile Bay necessitated a considerable degree of effort by other ships of the force.

In March 2003 Mobile Bay was assigned to Cruiser-Destroyer Group 5.

Mobile Bay operated in support of the 2003 invasion of Iraq from 17 June to 17 December 2004. The ship was later awarded the Iraq Campaign Medal.

In 2006, the cruiser was deployed to the Western Pacific, where she served as the Air Defense Commander for the Abraham Lincoln Carrier Strike Group.

On 16 February 2007, Mobile Bay was awarded the 2006 Battle "E" award. The ship completed a 10-month overhaul in early 2010.

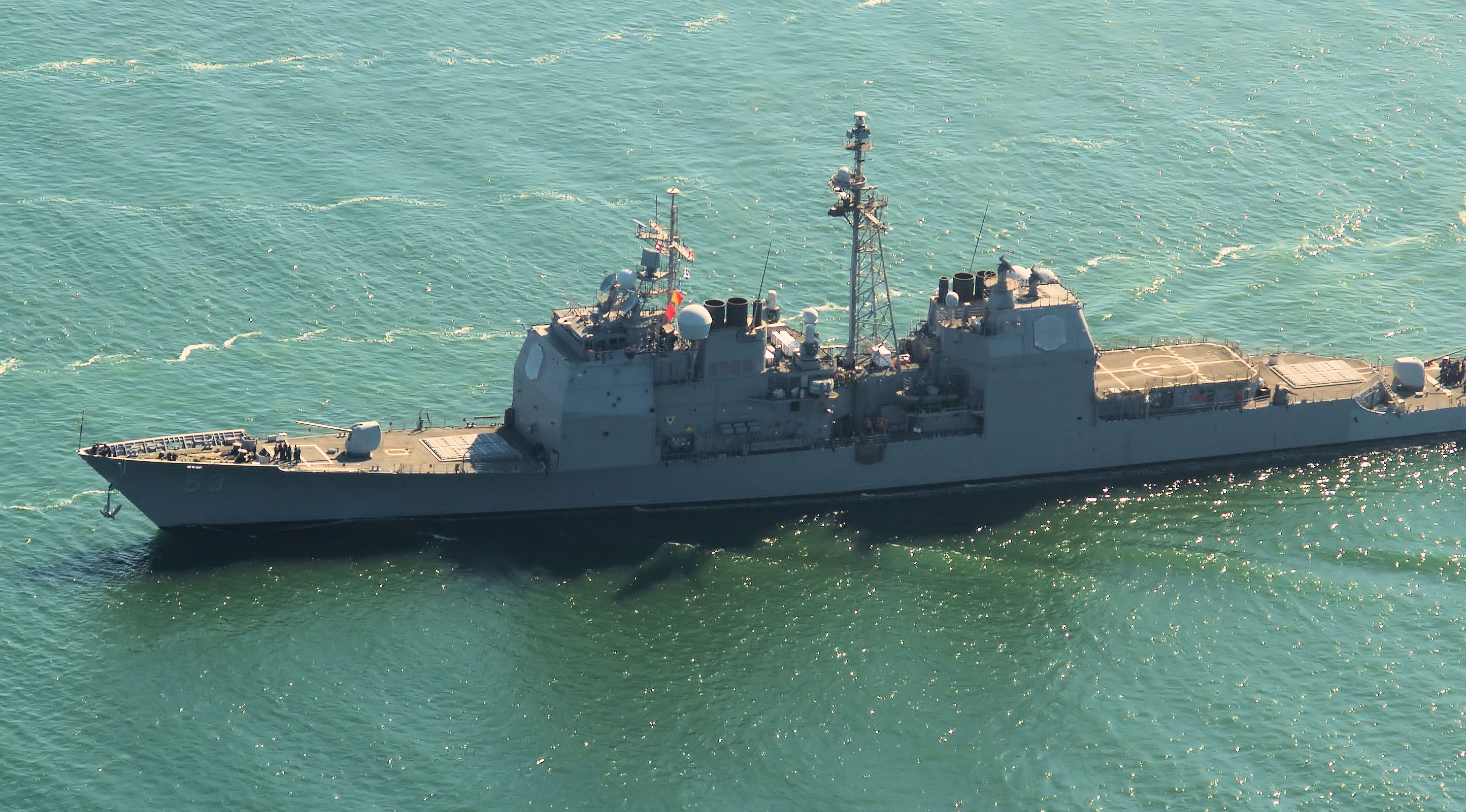
Mobile Bay in San Diego Bay, 2011

On 8 April 2011, the ship was given a failing grade of "unsatisfactory" in her INSURV inspection, mainly for problems with the ship's propulsion, operations, aviation, and communications. A remedial inspection was scheduled and passed in June 2011.

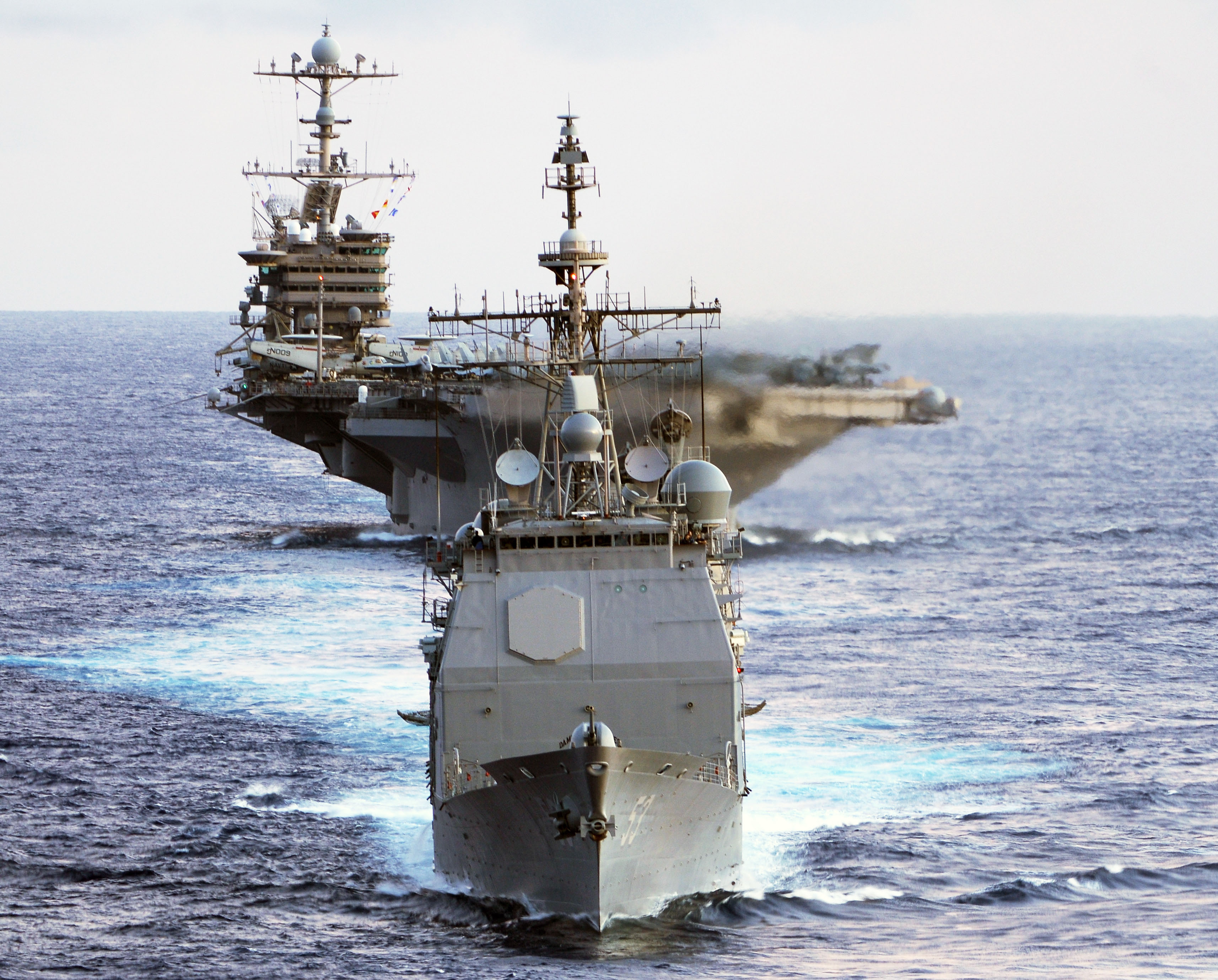
Mobile Bay leads the carrier John C. Stennis, 20 September 2012

The ship returned from back-to-back deployments (2011 and 2012) as the Air Defense Commander for John C Stennis Strike Group. She was awarded the 2012 Battle E and Spokane Award for her service.

In December 2020 the U.S. Navy's Report to Congress on the Annual Long-Range Plan for Construction of Naval Vessels stated that the ship was planned to be placed Out of Commission in Reserve in 2023.

On 9 May 2022, Mobile Bay transited the Philippine Sea and she steamed into Tokyo Bay on 22 May 2022 as a part of Carrier Strike Group 3 with USS Abraham Lincoln. Mobile Bay also participated in RIMPAC 2022 in that year.

On 10 August 2023, Mobile Bay was decommissioned at a ceremony at Naval Base San Diego after over 36 years of service.

On 12 July 2026, Mobile Bay was sunk during the course of RIMPAC 2026 with the use of AH-64 Apache attack helicopters, and by a Mark 48 torpedo launched by the Royal Canadian Navy submarine HMCS Corner Brook.

=== Awards ===
- Combat Action Ribbon - (Jan-Feb 1991)
- Joint Meritorious Unit Award - (10-28 Jun 1991)
- Navy Unit Commendation - (Jan-Feb 1991, Jan-May 2003, Sep 2002-Apr 2003, Jul 2012-May 2013, Sept-2023)
- Navy Meritorious Unit Commendation - (May-Sep 1992, 7–8 May 1994, Jul 1994-Apr 1996, 7–8 May 1994, 13-24 Dec 2001, Sep 2011-Jan 2012, Sep 2023)
- Battle "E" - (1993, 1995, 1998, 2000, 2003, 2004, 2006, 2008, 2012, 2013, 2014, 2015, 2023)
- National Defense Service Medal (second)
- Armed Forces Expeditionary Medal
- Southwest Asia Service Medal - (Oct 1990-Mar 1991)
- Iraq Campaign Medal - (2004)
- Sea Service Ribbon - multiple awards
- CNO Afloat Safety Award (PACFLT) - (2005)
- Spokane Trophy Award - (2012)

== Sources ==
- Stevens, David (2007). Strength Through Diversity: The combined naval role in Operation Stabilise (PDF). Working Papers. Vol. 20. Canberra: Sea Power Centre - Australia. ISBN 978-0-642-29676-4. ISSN 1834-7231. Archived from the original (PDF) on 10 September 2012.
