= Naval organization of the U.S.-led coalition during the Gulf War =

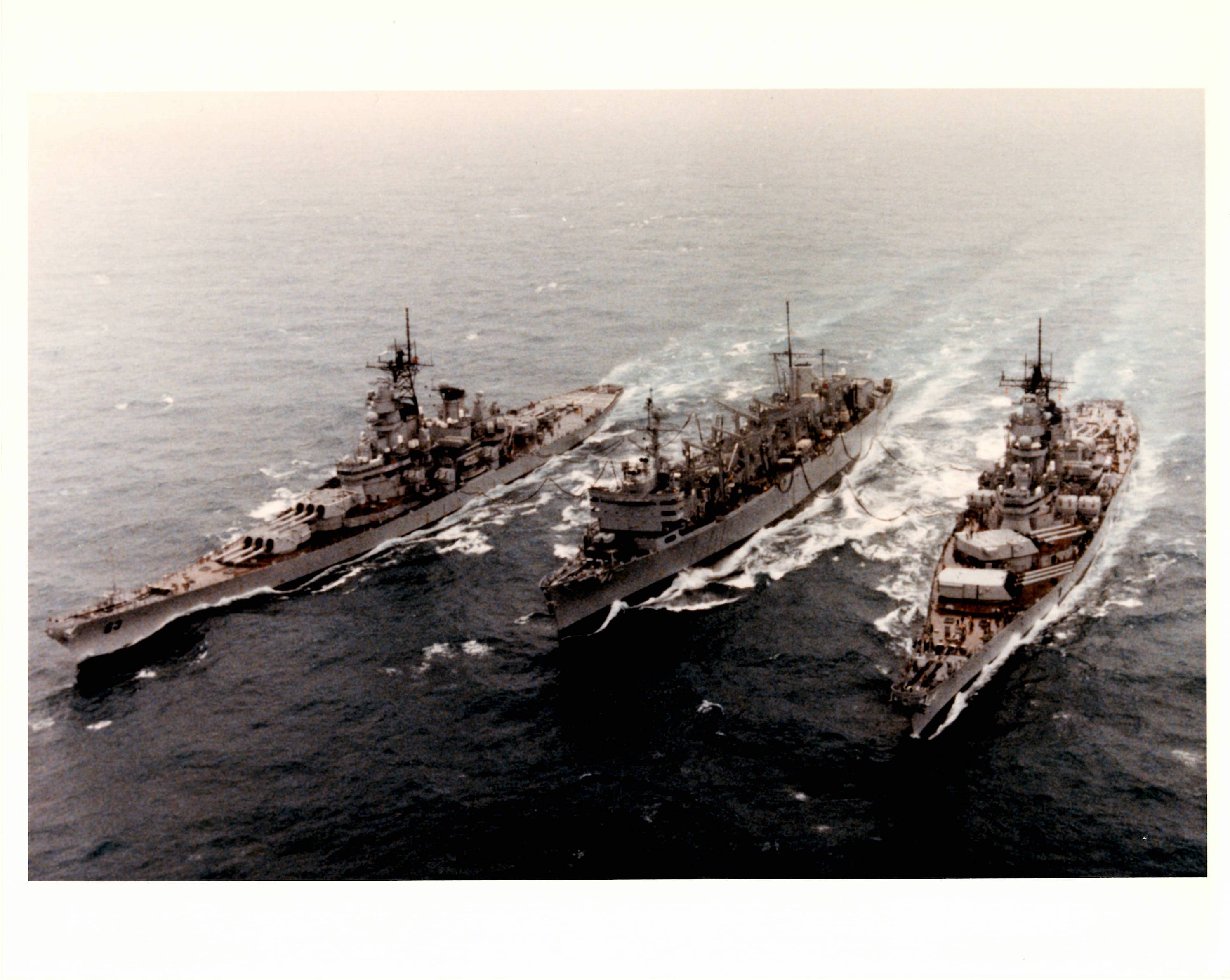
USS Sacramento (AOE-1), center, conducts an underway replenishment with USS Wisconsin (BB-64), foreground, and USS Missouri (BB-63) during Operation Desert Shield, 14 January 1991.

During the Gulf War of 1991 United States Naval Forces Central Command (NAVCENT) reported to United States Central Command. After discussions between General H. Norman Schwarzkopf (CINCCENT) and Admiral Huntington Hardisty (CINCPAC), Vice Admiral Henry H. Mauz Jr. ("Hank" Mauz), Commander Seventh Fleet, was appointed as Commander U.S. Naval Forces Central Command (COMUSNAVCENT).

After arrival in-theatre in late 1990, Vice Admiral Mauz "retained the Middle East Force, Commander Task Group 150.1 (CTG 150.1), for most warfighting functions inside the Persian Gulf. Under the CTG 150.1 designation, Rear Admiral William M. "Bill" Fogarty would control only the half-dozen ships or so of the Middle East Force, augmented by the battleship USS Wisconsin (BB-64) when it arrived. Under a second hat, CTG 150.2, Fogarty would be the commander of the U.S. Maritime Interception Force. For this job, his authority would extend outside the Persian Gulf to ships operating in the North Arabian Sea and Red Sea, but only for interception operations." The CVBGs in the North Arabian Sea and Red Sea were designated Task Groups 150.4 and 150.5 respectively; the Amphibious and Landing Forces were CTG 150.6 and CTG 150.8 (Major General Jenkins). Rear Admiral Stephen S. Clarey was Commander U.S. Maritime Prepositioning Force, Task Group 150.7, which was disestablished on 12 September 1990.

USS Dwight D. Eisenhower (CVN-69) transited from the Mediterranean/Suez Canal into the Red Sea on 8 August 1990 with USS Ticonderoga, USS John L. Hall, USS Suribachi (AE-21) and USNS Neosho (T-AO-143), the last two underway replenishment ships (CH-90, pp13–14). On 23–24 August, the Red Sea Battle Group was turned over to the USS Saratoga group, and 'Eisenhower' and 'Ticonderoga' left Sixth Fleet on 3 September.

From 1 January 1991, the six carriers deployed were divided into Battle Force Yankee (two carriers, including Saratoga, in the Red Sea under Rear Admiral Riley Mixson, Commander, Carrier Group Two/Task Force 155) and Task Force 154, Battle Force Zulu (four carriers in the Arabian Sea/Persian Gulf under Rear Admiral Daniel P. March, Commander, Carrier Group Five). TF 150 was Vice Admiral Henry H. Mauz, Jr. himself, TF 151 the Middle East Force, now including USS Bunker Hill, TG 150.3 Naval Logistics Support Force (Rear Admiral Bob Sutton), and TF 156 the amphibious force. Conduct of the Persian Gulf War Fig VII-3, lists the PG, Red Sea, and Middle East Forces; the Amphibious Force, the Logistics Support Force, at some points, the Mediterranean Strike Group, and NAVCENT Rep Riyadh.

Rear Admiral "Mixson also commanded CTG 150.9, the Mediterranean Strike Group, which included ships and a submarine launching TLAMs (eight) into Iraq several days after" the beginning of the Coalition assault on 17 January 1991.

On 15 February, France placed one frigate, Jean de Vienne (D-643), under U.S. operational control to escort Coalition combat logistics ships, but it was not authorised to take part in offensive operations.

  - Commander, Naval Forces Central Command: Vice Admiral Henry H. Mauz, CTF 150, USS Blue Ridge (LCC-19)

== Middle East Force, Task Force 151 ==
- USS La Salle (AGF-3), Rear Admiral William M. Fogarty
- Iowa-class battleships: USS Missouri (BB-63) and USS Wisconsin (BB-64)
- Belknap-class cruisers: USS England (CG-22) and USS Horne (CG-30)
- USS David R. Ray (DD-971)
- Oliver Hazard Perry-class guided missile frigates: USS Reid (FFG-30), USS Jarrett (FFG-33), USS Rentz (FFG-46), USS Vandegrift (FFG-48), USS Robert G. Bradley (FFG-49), and USS Taylor (FFG-50)
- USS Barbey (FF-1088)
- USS Avenger (MCM-1)
- USS Impervious (AM-449)
- Acme-class minesweepers: USS Adroit (MSO-509) and USS Leader (MSO-490)
- USS Sacramento (AOE-1)
- On 16 January 1991, USNS Comfort (T-AH-20) and USNS Mercy (T-AH-19) were within the Persian Gulf. Their exact task force assignment is not clear from Pokrant 1999.
  - (Australian) Task Group Medical Support Element 2 (onboard USNS Comfort)
- Commander U.S. Maritime Interception Force, CTF 152, Rear Admiral Fogarty, La Salle
  - Netherlands, Danish, Norwegian, Spanish, Belgian, Italy, Argentine, Greek MIF tasking/ships
  - U.S., UK, Australian, Canadian (CTG 302.2), French MIF tasking/ships

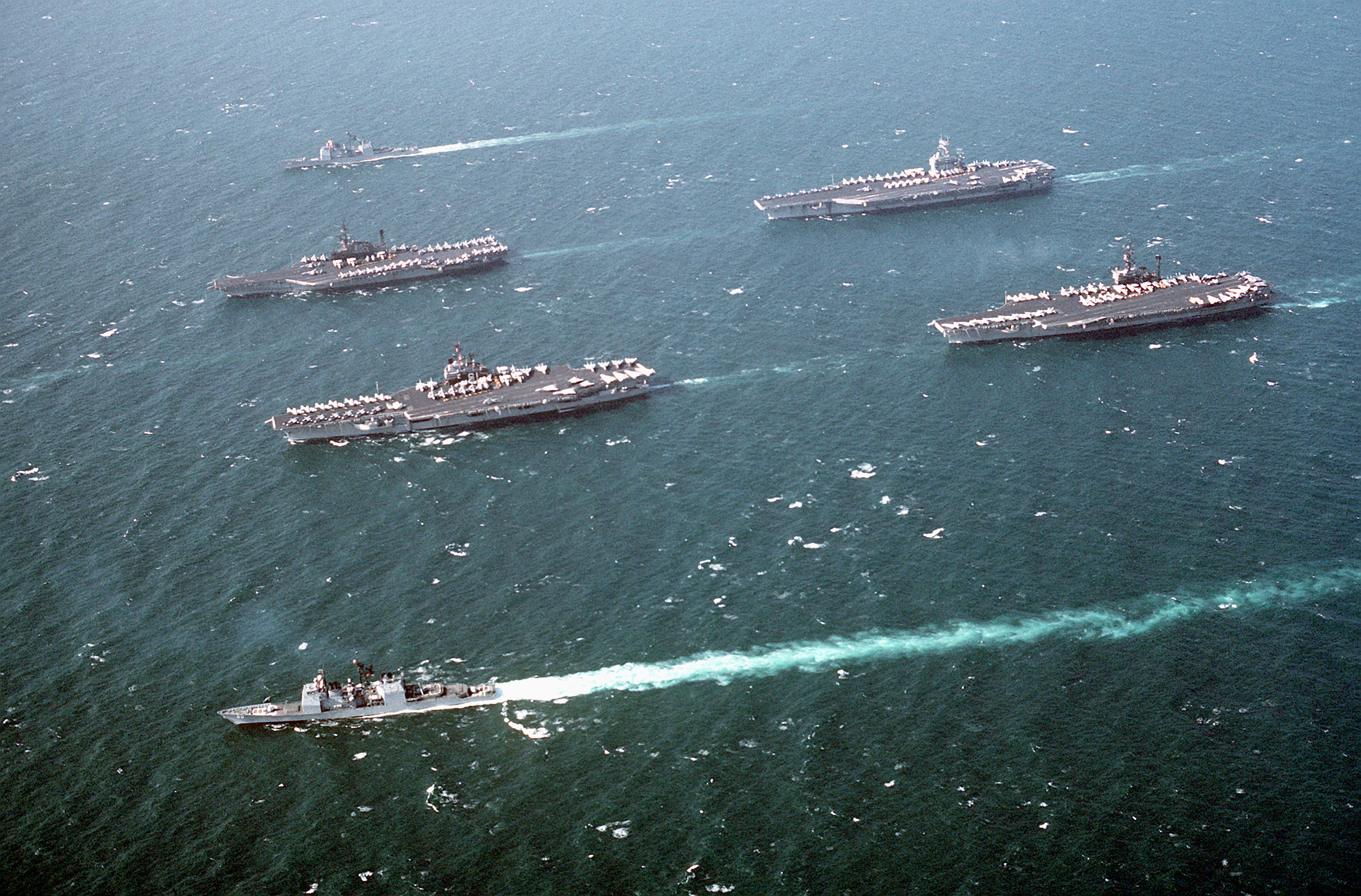
Ships of Battle Force Zulu / TF 154 after the ceasefire. USS Midway was the flagship of Battle Force Zulu.

== Task Force 154, Battle Force Zulu ==
- Battle Force Zulu
  - Cruiser-Destroyer Group 2 – in the Red Sea (later Persian Gulf)
    - USS America (CV-66)
    - USS Normandy (CG-60)
    - USS Virginia (CGN-38)
    - Farragut-class guided missile destroyers: USS William V. Pratt (DDG-44) and USS Preble (DDG-46)
    - USS Halyburton (FFG-40)
    - USS Kalamazoo (AOR-6)
    - USS Santa Barbara (AE-28)
    - Carrier Air Wing 1
      - Fighter Squadron 102 (Grumman F-14A Tomcat)
      - Fighter Squadron 33 (Grumman F-14A Tomcat)
      - Strike Fighter Squadron 82 (VFA-82) (McDonnell Douglas F/A-18C Hornet)
      - Strike Fighter Squadron 86 (McDonnell Douglas F/A-18C Hornet)
      - Attack Squadron 85 (Grumman A-6E/KA-6D Intruder)
      - Carrier Airborne Early Warning Squadron 123 (Grumman E-2C Hawkeye)
      - Electronic Attack Squadron 136 (Grumman EA-6B Prowler)
      - Helicopter Anti-Submarine Warfare Squadron 11 (Sikorsky SH-3H Sea King)
      - Sea Control Squadron 32 (S-3B Viking)
  - Carrier Group 5, Rear Admiral Daniel P. March
    - USS Midway (CV-41) – Flagship of Battle Force Zulu
    - Ticonderoga-class cruisers: USS Bunker Hill (CG-52) and USS Mobile Bay (CG-53)
    - Spruance-class destroyers: USS Hewitt (DD-966) and USS Oldendorf (DD-972)
    - Oliver Hazard Perry-class guided missile frigates: USS Curts (FFG-38) and USS Rodney M. Davis (FFG-60)
    - Carrier Air Wing 5
      - Strike Fighter Squadron 151 (McDonnell Douglas F/A-18 Hornet)
      - Strike Fighter Squadron 192 (McDonnell Douglas F/A-18 Hornet)
      - Strike Fighter Squadron 195 (McDonnell Douglas F/A-18 Hornet)
      - Attack Squadron 115 (Grumman A-6 Intruder)
      - Attack Squadron 185 (Grumman A-6 Intruder)
      - Electronic Attack Squadron 136 (Grumman EA-6B Prowler)
      - Carrier Airborne Early Warning Squadron 115 (Grumman E-2 Hawkeye)
      - Helicopter Anti-Submarine Warfare Squadron 12 (Sikorsky SH-3 Sea King)
      - Helicopter Maritime Strike Squadron 77 (Sikorsky SH-60 Seahawk) – Detachment A till February 10, then Detachment B from then, on-board USS Bunker Hill
  - Task Group 154.?/Carrier Group Seven, Rear Admiral Ronald J. Zlatoper
    - USS Ranger (CV-61)
    - Ticonderoga-class guided missile cruisers: USS Valley Forge (CG-50) and USS Princeton (CG-59)
    - Spruance-class destroyers: USS Paul F. Foster (DD-964) and USS Harry W. Hill (DD-986)
    - USS Francis Hammond (DE-1067)
    - USS Kansas City (AOR-3)
    - USS Shasta (AE-33)
    - Carrier Air Wing 2 – in 'Gruman Air Wing' format
      - Fighter Squadron 1 (Grumman F-14 Tomcat)
      - Fighter Squadron 2 (Grumman F-14 Tomcat)
      - Attack Squadron 145 (Grumman A-6 Intruder)
      - Attack Squadron 155 (Grumman A-6 Intruder)
      - Electronic Warfare Squadron 131 (VAQ-131) (Grumman EA-6B Prowler)
      - Anti-Submarine Squadron 38 (Lockheed S-3 Viking)
      - Early Warning Squadron 116 (Grumman E-2 Hawkeye)
      - Helicopter Anti-Submarine Squadron 14 (Sikorsky SH-3 Sea King)
      - Detachment 61, Fleet Logistics Support Squadron 30 (Grumman C-2 Greyhound)
      - Detachment, Fleet Logistics Support Squadron 50 (Grumman C-2 Greyhound)
  - Carrier Group Eight – in the Persian Gulf (later Red Sea)
    - USS Theodore Roosevelt (CVN-71)
    - USS Leyte Gulf (CG-55)
    - USS Richmond K. Turner (CG-20)
    - USS Caron (DD-970)
    - USS Vreeland (DE-1068)
    - USS Hawes (FFG-53)
    - USS San Diego (AFS-6)
    - USS Platte (AO-186)
    - USS Nitro (AE-23)
    - Carrier Air Wing 8
      - Fighter Squadron 41 (Grumman F-14 Tomcat)
      - Fighter Squadron 84 (Grumman F-14 Tomcat)
      - Strike Fighter Squadron 15 (McDonnell Douglas F/A-18 Hornet)
      - Strike Fighter Squadron 87 (McDonnell Douglas F/A-18 Hornet)
      - Attack Squadron 36 (Grumman A-6 Intruder)
      - Attack Squadron 65 (Grumman A-6 Intruder)
      - Electronic Warfare Squadron 141 (Grumman EA-6B Prowler)
      - Anti-Submarine Squadron 24 (Lockheed S-3 Viking)
      - Airborne Early Warning Squadron 124 (Grumman E-2 Hawkeye)
      - Helicopter Anti-Submarine Squadron 9 (Sikorsky SH-3 Sea King)
      - Detachment D, Fleet Logistics Squadron 40 (Grumman C-2 Greyhound)

== Task Force 155, Battle Force Yankee ==
Battle Force Yankee included two carriers, including Saratoga, in the Red Sea under Rear Admiral Riley Mixson, Commander, Carrier Group Two/Task Force 155).

- Los Angeles-class attack submarines: USS Pittsburgh (SSN-720), USS Chicago (SSN-721), and USS Louisville (SSN-724) (in the Red Sea)
- (United States) Kennedy Battle Group (Task Group 155.?)
  - USS John F. Kennedy (CV-67)
  - Ticonderoga-class guided missile cruisers: USS Thomas S. Gates (CG-51) and USS San Jacinto (CG-56)
  - USS Mississippi (CGN-40)
  - USS Moosbrugger (DD-980)
  - USS Samuel B. Roberts (FFG-58)
  - USS Seattle (AOE-3)
  - USS Sylvania (AFS-2)
  - (United States) Carrier Air Wing 3
    - Fighter Squadron 14 (Grumman F-14 Tomcat)
    - Fighter Squadron 32 (Grumman F-14 Tomcat)
    - Attack Squadron 46 (LTV A-7 Corsair II)
    - Attack Squadron 72 (LTV A-7 Corsair II)
    - Attack Squadron 75 (Grumman A-6 Intruder)
    - Electronic Warfare Squadron 130 (Grumman EA-6B Prowler)
    - Anti-Submarine Squadron 22 (Lockheed S-3 Viking)
    - Early Warning Squadron 126 (Grumman E-2 Hawkeye)
    - Helicopter Anti-Submarine Warfare Squadron 7 (Sikorsky SH-3 Sea King)
- (United States) Cruiser-Destroyer Group 8/Task Group 155.?
  - USS Saratoga (CV-60) – flagship
  - USS Biddle (CG-34)
  - USS Philippine Sea (CG-58)
  - USS Spruance (DD-963)
  - USS Sampson (DDG-10)
  - Knox-class frigates: USS Elmer Montgomery (FF-1082) and USS Thomas C. Hart (FF-1092)
  - Carrier Air Wing 17 - deployment to the Mediterranean Sea and the Red Sea from 7 August 1990 to 28 March 1991.
    - Fighter Squadron 74 (Grumman F-14 Tomcat)
    - Fighter Squadron 103 (Grumman F-14 Tomcat)
    - Strike Fighter Squadron 81 (McDonnell Douglas F/A-18 Hornet)
    - Strike Fighter Squadron 83 (McDonnel Douglas F/A-18 Hornet)
    - Attack Squadron 35 (Grumman A-6/KA-6D Intruder)
      - Electronic Warfare Squadron 132 (Grumman EA-6B Prowler)
      - Anti-Submarine Squadron 30 (Lockheed S-3 Viking)
      - Airborne Early Warning Squadron 125 (Grumman E-2 Hawkeye)
      - Helicopter Anti-Submarine Warfare Squadron 3 (Sikorsky SH-3 Sea King)

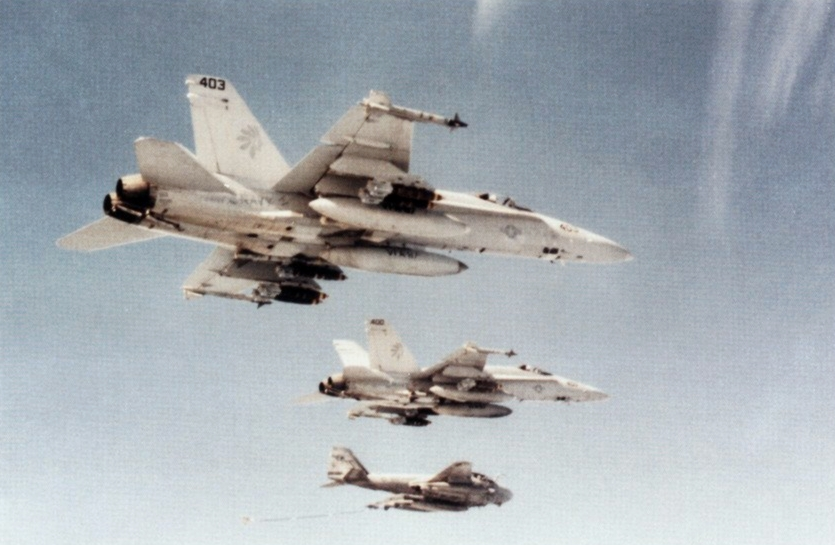
Two F/A-18As from VFA-87 about to refuel from an A-6E from VA-36 during Desert Storm in 1991.

== Task Force 156, Amphibious Force ==
- Rear Admiral J.B. LaPlante, Commander, Task Force 156 and Amphibious Group 2
- USS Nassau (LHA-4) - flagship of ATF, Landing Force, and Amphibious Group 2
- Amphibious Ready Group Alfa (from Seventh Fleet)
  - 13 MEU (SOC) embarked
  - USS Inchon (LPH-12)
  - USS Nashville (LPD-13)
  - USS Whidbey Island (LSD-41)
  - Newport-class tank landing ships: USS Newport (LST-1179) and USS Fairfax County (LST-1193)
- Amphibious Ready Group Bravo from Seventh Fleet (Amphibious Squadron 5)
  - Headquarters, Battalion Landing Team 1st Battalion, 4th Marines
  - Marine Composite Helicopter Squadron 164
  - Service Support Group 13
  - USS Okinawa (LPH-3)
  - USS Ogden (LPD-5)
  - USS Fort McHenry (LSD-43)
  - USS Cayuga (LST-1186)
  - USS Durham (LKA-114)
- Amphibious Group 3
        - USS Tarawa (LHA-1) – flagship
        - USS Tripoli (LPH-10) - later reassigned for mine-hunting and damaged by a mine on 18 February 1991
        - USS New Orleans (LPH-11)
        - USS Anchorage (LSD-36)
        - USS Mount Vernon (LSD-39)
        - USS Vancouver (LPD-2)

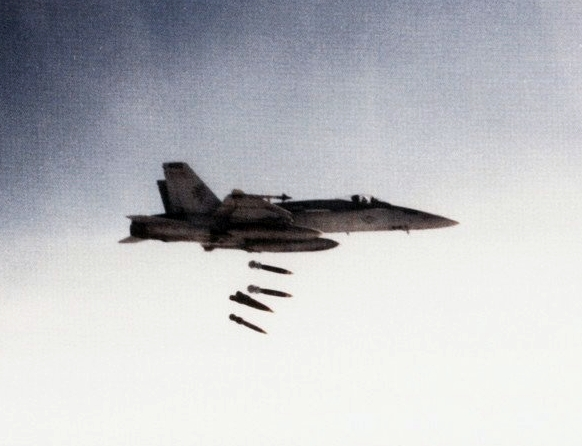
A U.S. Navy McDonnell Douglas F/A-18A from VFA-87 dropping Mk 82 bombs during a sortie in the 1991 Gulf War.

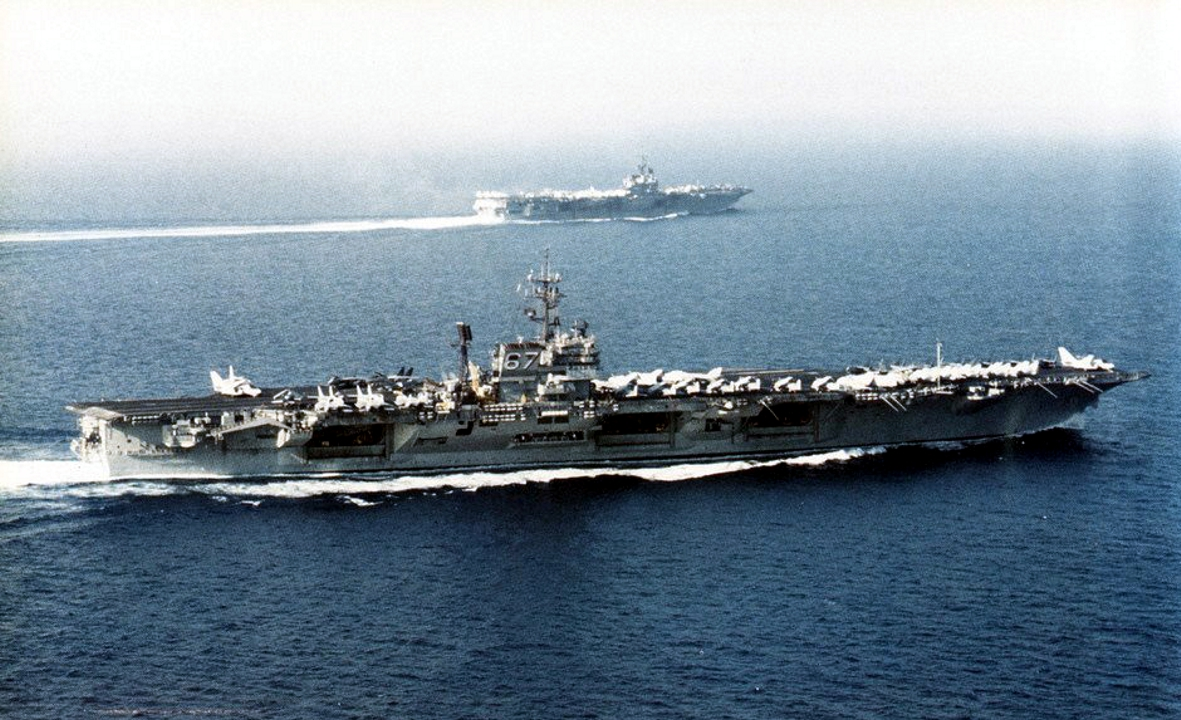
The U.S. Navy aircraft carriers USS John F. Kennedy (CV-67) and USS Saratoga (CV-60) underway, probably during the 1991 Gulf War in the Red Sea.

== Task Force 158, Landing Force ==
- Major General Harry Jenkins, Commander, 4th MEB and Commander Landing Force (CTF 158). Task organisation issued 1 January 1991
- Task Group 158.1/4th Marine Expeditionary Brigade (4th MEB)
  - Communications Section
  - Detachment, 2nd Radio Battalion
  - Team detachments from the Marine All-source Fusion Center
  - 5th Counterintelligence Team
  - Detachment, 2nd Intelligence Company
  - 2nd Force Imagery Interpretation Unit
  - Detachment, 2nd Force Reconnaissance Company
  - 2nd Remotely Piloted Vehicle Company
  - 2nd Topographic Platoon
  - Regimental Landing Team 2
    - Headquarters Company
    - A Company, 2nd Reconnaissance Battalion
    - Companies B & D, 2nd Light Armored Infantry Battalion
    - A Company, 2nd Tank Battalion (22 x M60 main battle tanks)
    - 1st Battalion, 2nd Marines
    - 3rd Battalion, 2nd Marines
    - 1st Battalion, 10th Marines (reinforced) (18 x M198 155mm howitzers)
    - A Company, 2nd Assault Amphibian Battalion
    - A Company, 2nd Combat Engineer Battalion
    - Truck Company Detachment, Headquarters Battalion, 2nd Marine Division
  - Brigade Service Support Group 4
      - Headquarters Battalion, 2nd Force Service Support Group
      - 8th Communications Battalion
      - 8th Engineer Support Battalion
      - 8th Motor Transport Battalion
      - 2nd Landing Support Battalion
      - 2nd Supply Battalion
      - 2nd Maintenance Battalion
      - 2nd Medical Battalion
      - 2nd Dental Battalion
      - 2nd Military Police Company
  - Marine Aircraft Group 40
    - Headquarters and Headquarters Squadron 28
    - Marine Air Control Squadron 6
    - Marine Wing Communications Squadron 28
    - Marine Attack Squadron 331 (VMA-331) (20 x McDonnell Douglas AV-8B Harrier II) – embarked on the USS Nassau
    - Marine Light Attack Helicopter Squadron 269 (15 x Bell AH-1 SuperCobra and 6 x Bell UH-1N Twin Huey)
    - Marine Medium Helicopter Squadron 263 (12 x Boeing Vertol CH-46 Sea Knight)
    - Marine Medium Helicopter Squadron 365 (12 x Boeing Vertol CH-46 Sea Knight)
    - Marine Heavy Helicopter Squadron 461 (16 x Sikorsky CH-53E Super Stallion)
    - A Battery, 2nd Low Altitude Air Defence Battalion
    - Marine Aviation Logistics Squadron 14
    - Marine Wing Service Support Squadron 274
    - Detachment B, Marine Air Support Squadron 1
- Task Unit 158.1.4/13th Marine Expeditionary Unit (Special Operations Capable)
  - Ground Element
    - 1st Battalion, 4th Marines
      - 3 Platoon, A Company, 1st Reconnaissance Battalion
      - Detachment 13, 1st Light Armored Infantry Battalion
      - 1 Platoon, A Company, 3rd Assault Amphibian Battalion
      - B Battery, 1st Battalion, 11th Marines
      - 1 Platoon, A Company, 1st Combat Engineer Battalion
  - Aviation Element (4 x Bell UH-1N Twin Huey) – all below have detachments from those units listed
    - Marine Medium Helicopter Squadron 164 (12 x Boeing Vertol CH-46 Sea Knight)
    - Marine Heavy Helicopter Squadron 466 (4 x Sikorsky CH-53 Sea Stallion)
    - Marine Aviation Logistics Squadron 16
    - Marine Wing Support Squadron 374
    - Marine Air Traffic Control Squadron 38
    - Marine Light Attack Squadron 267 (4 x Bell AH-1 SuperCobra)
    - Marine Air Support Squadron 3
    - Marine Air Control Squadron 1
    - 3rd Low Altitude Air Defence Battalion (5 x FIM-92 Stinger surface-to-air missiles)
  - Service Support Group 13 – all below have detachments from those units listed
    - Headquarters and Service Battalion
    - 7th Communications Battalion
    - 7th Engineer Support Battalion
    - 7th Motor Transport Battalion
    - 1st Landing Support Battalion
    - 1st Supply Battalion
    - 1st Maintenance Battalion
    - 1st Medical Battalion
    - 1st Dental Battalion
- Task Group 158.2/5th Marine Expeditionary Brigade, commanded by Major General Peter J. Rowe (reporting directly to HQ, NAVCENT) – contained the highest percentage of reserve units – ground later detached to 2nd Marine Expeditionary Force (afloat)

== Coalition Naval Forces ==
- (Canada) Task Group 302.2, Royal Canadian Navy
  - HMCS Terra Nova (DDE-259)
  - HMCS Athabaskan (DDG 282)
  - HMCS Protecteur (AOR 509)
  - No. 443 Maritime Helicopter Squadron, Canadian Forces Air Command (five Sikorsky SH-3 Sea King)
- (Australia) Task Group 627.4, Royal Australian Navy (Operation Damask II) – dual role of providing an anti-aircraft screen for the US carrier groups, and intercepting Iraqi motor vessels
  - Task Group Medical Support Element 2 (onboard USS Comfort)
  - HMAS Brisbane (D-41)
  - HMAS Sydney (FFG-03)
    - 1 x each of S-70B-2 Seahawk and AS-350BA Squirrel – from No. 723 Squadron, Royal Australian Navy Fleet Air Arm
  - HMAS Westralia (O-195)
    - Detachment, 111 Light Battery, 16th Air Defence Regiment, Royal Australian Artillery
  - HMAS Success (OR-304)
  - Logistic Support Element, in Muscat, Sultanate of Oman
    - Logistic Support Detachment, Bahrain
    - Logistic Support Detachment, Dubai

== Royal Navy, east of Suez ==
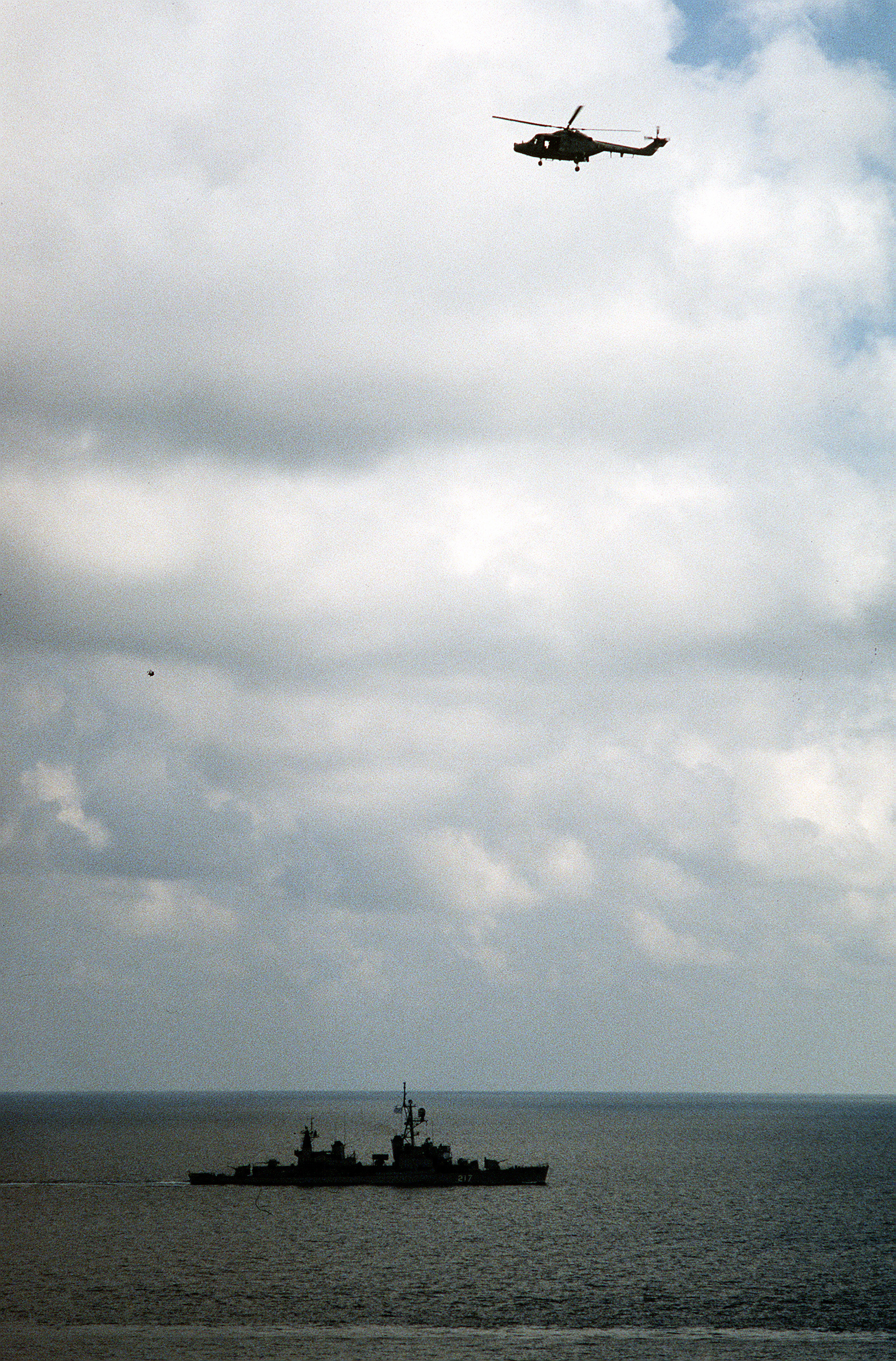
A Lynx helicopter of the Royal Navy flies over the Greek destroyer HS Kriezis (DD-217), part of Operation Desert Shield.

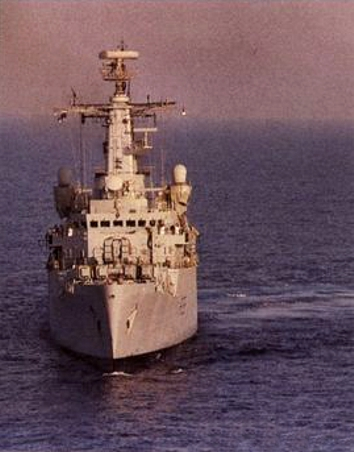
A Royal Navy Type 22 frigate underway in the Red Sea, in 1991. The ship is either HMS Battleaxe (F89) or HMS Brazen (F91).

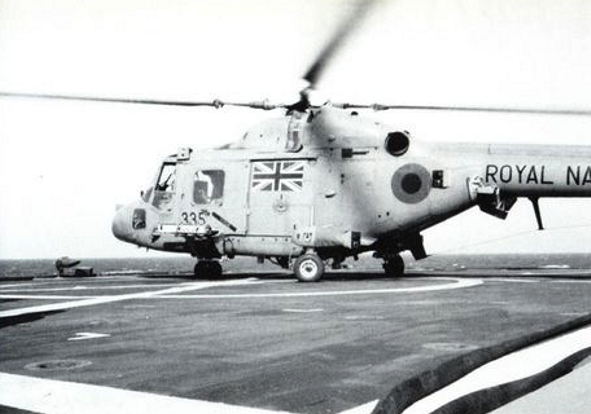
A Royal Navy Westland Sea Lynx HAS.3 aboard the U.S. Navy destroyer USS Leftwich (DD-984) during the 1991 Gulf War.

During the Gulf Conflict, the Royal Navy "had a pivotal role in joint operations". Westland Lynx helicopters were tasked with finding and destroying Iraqi Navy vessels. A large element of the Royal Navy undertook the coalition's mine hunting in the northern Gulf. In clearing the Gulf of mines, the Royal Navy minehunters enabled the battleships USS Missouri and USS Wisconsin to sail into Kuwaiti waters, from where they would fire their 16-inch guns on Iraqi positions ashore. The Type 42 destroyers provided air defence for these vessels, notably when HMS Gloucester was able to intercept a missile fired at Missouri. In total, the Fleet Air Arm destroyed some 15 Iraqi patrol vessels, achieving a 93% hit rate, and accounting for ^{1}/_{4} of all ships destroyed in the war.

Preliminary command arrangements for the BAe Nimrod detachment to be sent to the Gulf were made on 10 August 1990:

"The Joint Commander of British forces in the Gulf (the AOC-in-C Strike Command) assumed operational command of the Nimrod detachment, while operational control was vested in the Air Commander British Forces Arabian Peninsular. Tactical command of the Nimrod detachment was exercised by the Detachment Commander, who reported to the Air Commander, but it was accepted that tactical control (TACON) might be delegated to the Royal Navy Task Group already deployed in the Gulf, Task Group 321.1 (under the Commander Task Group (CTG 321.1), the Senior Naval Officer Middle East."

It appears that command of Task Force 321 was retained by the Commander-in-Chief Fleet at Northwood Headquarters in the northwest of London. On 29 November 1990 Commodore Chris Craig relieved Commodore Paul Haddocks as Senior Naval Officer Middle East.

- Commander Task Group 321.1/Senior Naval Officer Middle East (Commodore Chris Craig aboard HMS London (F95))
  - Naval Party 1036 (Field Hospital Enhancement Party), onboard RFA Argus
  - Naval Party 1037 (Forward Diving Team)
  - Naval Party 1038 (Electronic Warfare Specialistis)
  - Naval Party 1039 (Preparation Sea King Helicopters for Gulf (under Flag Officer Naval Air Command), based at King Abdulaziz International Airport
  - Explosive Ordnance Disposal (EOD) Cell
  - Type 22 'Broadsword'-class anti-submarine frigates: HMS Battleaxe (F89)
  - Leander-class frigate: HMS Jupiter (F60)
  - Type 42 'Sheffield'-class destroyers: HMS Exeter (D89), HMS Manchester (D95), HMS Gloucester (D96), HMS York (D98) and HMS Cardiff (D108)
  - Type 22 'Broadsword'-class anti-submarine frigates: HMS Brazen (F91), HMS Brave (F94), and HMS Brilliant (F90)
  - Oberon-class submarines: HMS Otus (S18) and HMS Opossum (S19) – both landed special forces
  - Royal Fleet Auxiliary:
    - RFA Olna (A123)
    - RFA Diligence (A132)
    - RFA Argus (A135) – medical reception ship role
    - RFA Fort Grange (A385)
    - RFA Resource (A480)
    - Leaf-class support tankers: RFA Bayleaf (A109) and RFA Orangeleaf (A110)
    - Round Table-class landing ship logistics: RFA Sir Tristram (L3505), RFA Sir Bedivere (L3004), RFA Sir Galahad (L3005), and RFA Sir Percivale (L3036)
  - Mine Countermeasures ships
      - Hecla-class survey vessel: HMS Hecla (A133) and HMS Herald (H138) – squadron flagship(s)
      - Hunt-class mine countermeasures vessels: HMS Brecon (M29), HMS Ledbury (M30), HMS Cattistock (M31), HMS Brocklesby (M33), HMS Dulverton (M35), HMS Bicester (M36), HMS Atherstone (M38), and HMS Hurworth (M39)
  - Fleet Air Arm
    - 815 Naval Air Squadron (Westland Lynx (HAS.3)) – deployed on the destroyers
    - 846 Naval Air Squadron (6 x Westland Sea King HC.4) – available for Medevac to RFA Argus if needed
    - Several Flights from 829 Naval Air Squadron (Westland Lynx)
  - Elements, Special Boat Service, Royal Marines
  - Royal Marines Band Service

Ashore supporting the 1st (UK) Armoured Division was the Support Helicopter Force Middle East, which included a composite Royal Marine Westland Sea King HC.4 made up of six aircraft each from 845 Naval Air Squadron and 848 Naval Air Squadron, totalling 12.

== Western European Naval Force ==
In September 1990, at one of the early coordinating meetings for the maritime interception operation, French and Italian representatives asked for a separate role for the naval units of the Western European Union (WEU) states. The WEU states were therefore assigned a separate operating area off the United Arab Emirates. The WEU decided to place their ships under the operational command of the French Amiral Ocean Indien (ALINDIEN).

- (France) Admiral Indian Ocean (ALINDIEN)
  - (France) (Belgium) (Kingdom of the Netherlands) WEU Combined Mine Countermeasures Flotilla
    - (France) French Element
      - Mine Countermeasures Support Vessel: Loire (A615)
      - Éridan-class minehunters: L'Aigle (M-647), Orion (M-645), Cassiopée (M-642), Pegase, Pluton, and Sagittaire (M-650)
    - (Belgium) Belgian Element
      - Minehunters: Zinnia (A-961) and Tripartite-class minehunters: Iris (M-920), Myosotis (M-922), and Dianthus (M918) (from 27 February)
    - (Kingdom of the Netherlands) Dutch Element
      - Minehunters: HNLMS Haarlem, HNLMS Harlingen, and HNLMS Zierikzee
  - (Portugal) Portuguese Navy
    - Replenishment vessels: NRP São Gabriel and NRP São Miguel – acting as a replenishment vessel for the Royal Navy
  - (France) French Forces in the Gulf (Les Forces Français dans Le Golfe) (Opération Artimon)
    - Frigate, Premier Maître L'Her (F-792)
    - Escort Vessel, Doudart de Lagrée (F-728)
    - Tanker, Durance (A-629)
  - (Belgium) Belgian Royal Naval Force (Operation Southern Breeze)
    - Frigate, Wielingen (F910)

== Royal Navy, Mediterranean ==
- Flag Officer, Second Flotilla/CTG 323.2 (Rear Admiral John Brigstocke, Eastern Mediterranean)
  - Invincible-class aircraft carrier: HMS Ark Royal (R07) – task group flagship
    - 800 Naval Air Squadron (Eight British Aerospace Sea Harrier)
    - 814 Naval Air Squadron (Westland Sea King)
    - 820 Naval Air Squadron (Westland Sea King Mk 6)
  - Escorts Sheffield, Charybdis, RFAs Olmeda, Regent

== See also ==
- Gulf War order of battle: United States Navy
- List of orders of battle

== Notes ==
- IISS Military Balance 1991, Ship Listing for Multi-National Coalition, early 1991

=== References ===
- Brown, Lieutenant Colonel Ronald J. (1998). United States Marines in the Persian Gulf, 1990–1991 with Marine Forces afloat in Desert Shield and Desert Storm. Washington, District of Columbia: History and Museum Division, Headquarters, United States Marine Corps.
- Dinackus, Thomas D. (2000). Order of Battle: Allied Ground Forces of Operation Desert Storm. Central Point, Oregon: Hellgate Press. ISBN 1-55571-493-5.
- Friedman, Norman (1992). Desert Victory: The War for Kuwait. Naval Institute Press.
- Quilter II, Colonel Charles J. (1993). United States Marines in the Persian Gulf, 1990–1991 with the I Marine Expeditionary Force in Desert Shield and Storm. District of Columbia, United States of America: History and Museums Division, Headquarters, United States Marine Corps.
- Jean H. Morin; Richard H. Gimblett (1997). Operation Friction 1990-1991: The Canadian Forces in the Persian Gulf. Dundurn. ISBN 9781459713338.
- Naval History and Heritage Command, U.S. Naval Forces Central Command, Desert Shield Operations, Naval History Documentation Team, COLL/56, documents from 1990
- Director Defence Studies RAF (Summer 2016). Air Power Review: First Gulf War 25th Anniversary -Special Edition.
- Pokrant, Marvin (1999). Desert Shield at Sea: What the Navy Really Did: Volume 174 of Contributions in Military Studies. Greenwood Publishing Group. ISBN 0313310238.
- Richards, Bill; Smith, Peter (December 2006). "Onslow's Jolly Roger". Signals (77). Australian National Maritime Museum: 11. ISSN 1033-4688.
- John Roberts (April 2009). Safeguarding the Nation: The Story of the Modern Royal Navy. Seaforth Publishing.
- Robinson, Colin D. (January 2020). "The U.S. Navy's task forces: 1–199". Defence and Security Analysis. 36 (1): 109–110. doi:10.1080/14751798.2020.1712028.
- Thompson (2021). "Order of Battle for CENTCOM Naval Forces". www.tim-thompson.com.
- USS Theodore Roosevelt (1990). "Roosevelt Command History 1990" (PDF). Archived from the original (PDF) on 2015-01-20.
