= Tactical Airborne Reconnaissance Pod System =

US Navy camera pod for the F-14 (1981–2006)

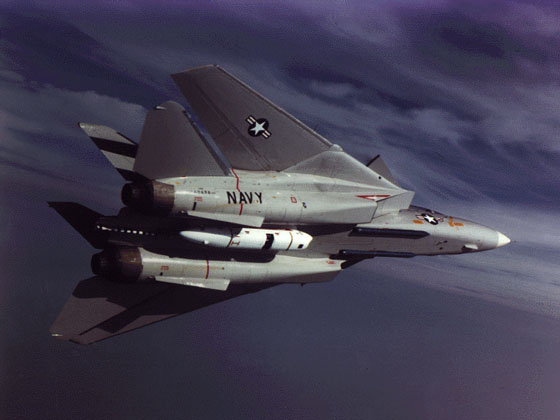
F-14 with a TARPS pod mounted

The Tactical Airborne Reconnaissance Pod System (TARPS) was a large and sophisticated camera pod carried by the Grumman F-14 Tomcat. (Note: The pod was originally developed for use by the A-7 Corsair) It contains three camera bays with different type cameras which are pointed down at passing terrain. It was originally designed to provide an interim aerial reconnaissance capability until a dedicated F/A-18 Hornet reconnaissance version could be fielded. TARPS was pressed into service upon arrival in the fleet in 1981, and remained in use up to the end of Tomcat service in 2006.

== TARPS pod and Tomcat interoperability ==
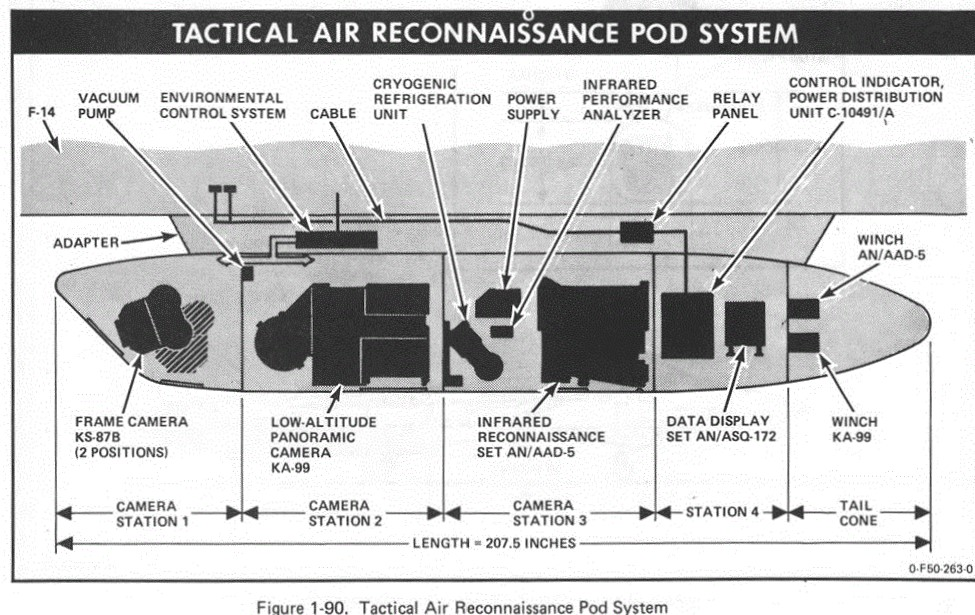
TARPS drawing.

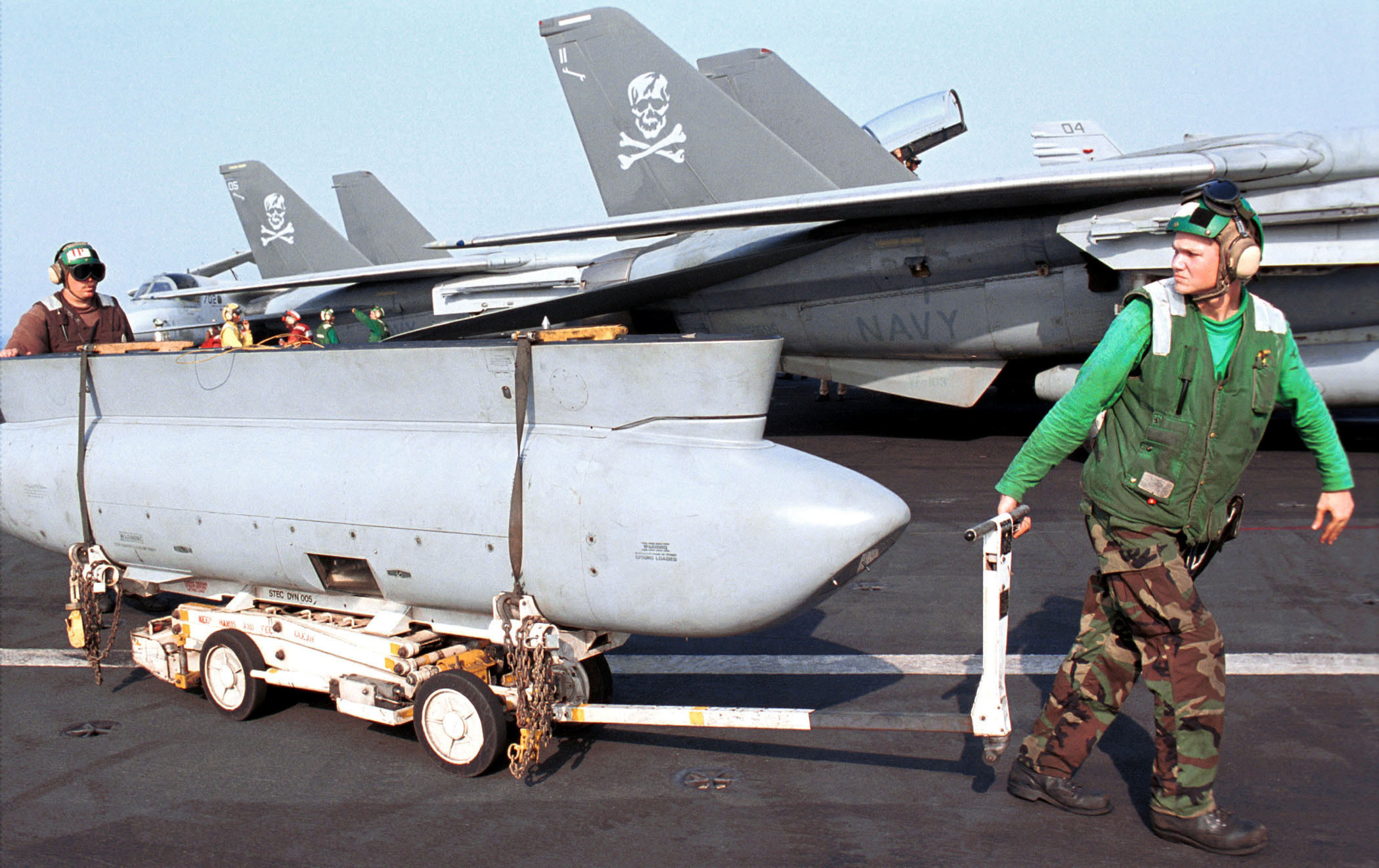
At 17 feet (5.2 m) and weighing 1,850 lb (840 kg), the TARPS is the largest device hung on a Tomcat.

The pod itself is 17 feet (5.2 m) long, and weighs 1,850 lb (840 kg). and is carried on the starboard side of the tunnel between the engine nacelles. The F-14A and F-14B Tomcats had to be specially modified to carry the TARPS pod which involved routing of control wiring from the rear cockpit and environmental control system (ECS) connections to the pod. Standard allowance was at least three TARPS aircraft per designated squadron (only one per airwing). All F-14Ds were modified to be TARPS capable, which allowed greater flexibility in scheduling aircraft and conducting maintenance. A control panel is fitted to the rear cockpit and the RIO has total control over pod operation except for a pilot controlled button that can activate cameras as selected by the RIO (but seldom used).

== Camera bays ==
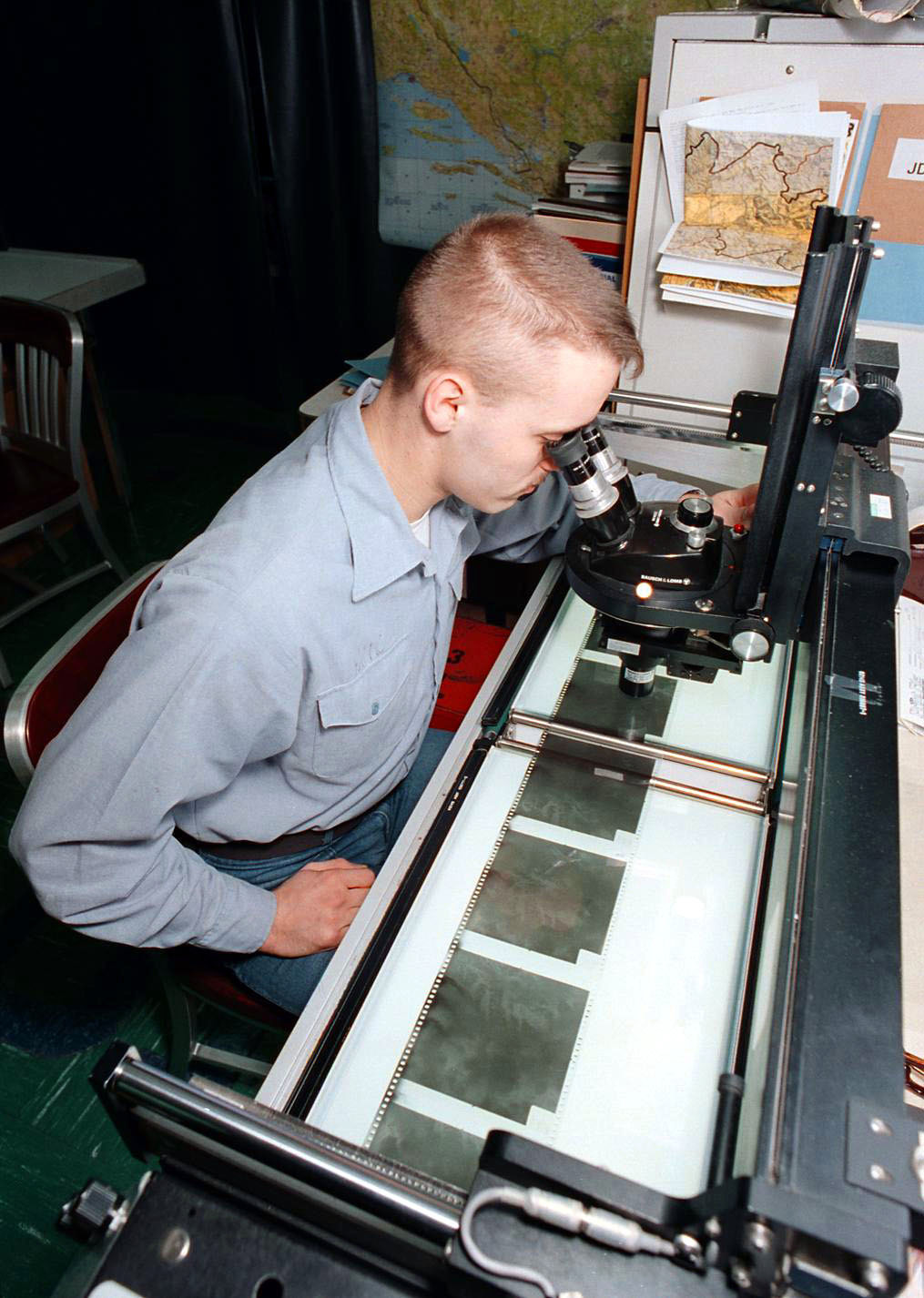
TARPS intelligence specialist uses a light table to analyze film from KS-87 camera.

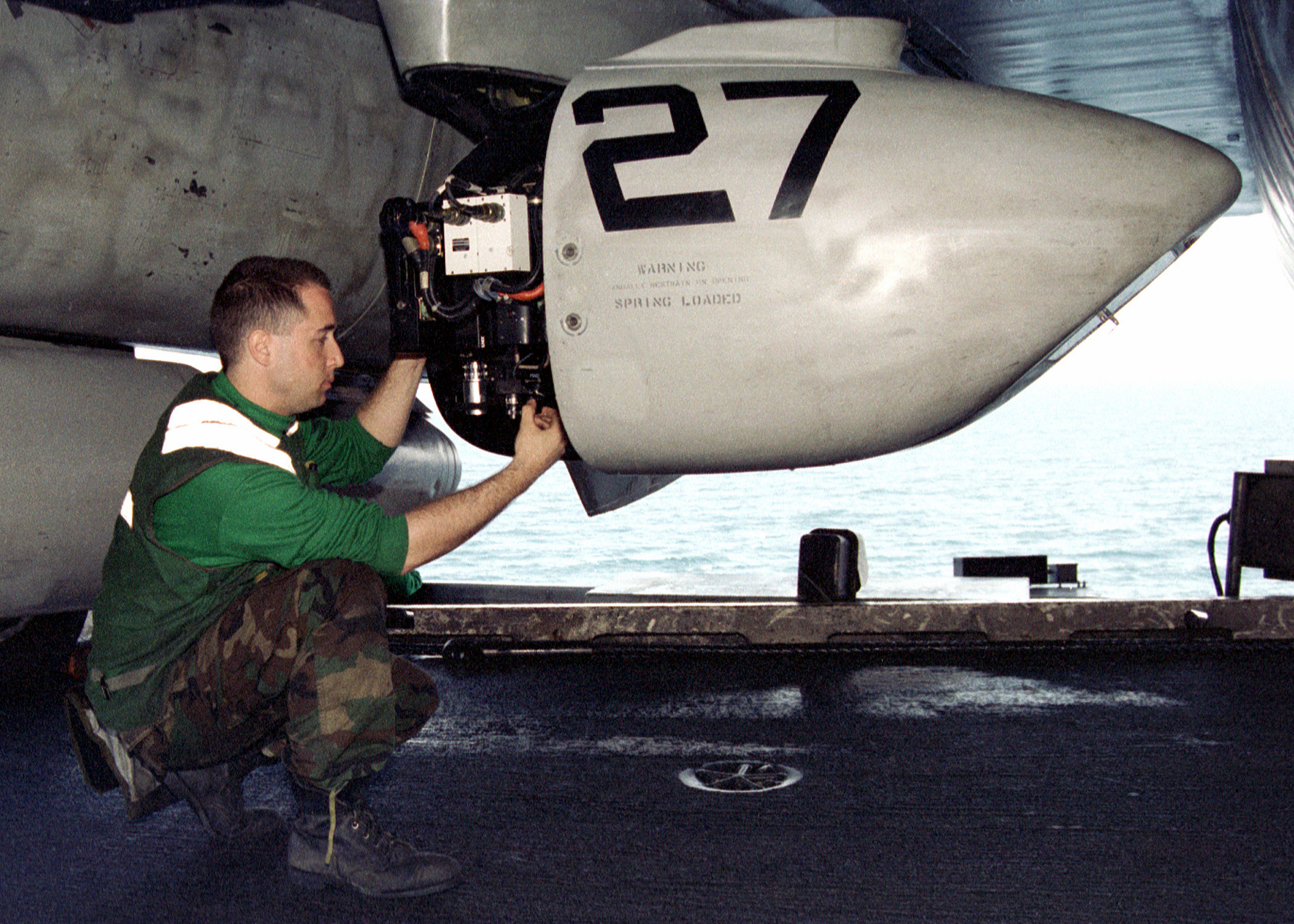
TARPS personnel attending to forward camera bay

Each of the camera bays was designed to carry different cameras for specific tasks on reconnaissance missions. The forward bay held a 150 mm (6") focal length serial frame camera (KS-87) on a two position rotating mount which could direct the camera's view straight down or be moved to a 45° angle for a forward oblique view. The second bay or middle bay of the TARPS pod originally held the 230 mm (9") focal length KA-99 panoramic camera which rotated from horizon to horizon and could be used for side oblique photography. Each image in the wide field of view position produced a 91 cm (36") negative. The KA-99 could carry up to 2,000 feet (610 m) of film that could be exhausted if not managed carefully by the RIO. The third camera bay held an infrared line scanner camera used for night missions or daylight mission traces. All TARPS cameras were monitored by a device called a CIPDU in the tail cone section of the pod that provided camera status to maintenance personnel and during flight provided aircraft position data onto the camera imagery for intel analysis. An electrical umbilical cord connected the pod to the control panel that was positioned on the left side of the rear cockpit. A hose from the ECS from the F-14 cooled/heated the internals of the pod in flight and kept the appropriate humidity levels constant. In 1987 VF-111 was the first squadron to deploy with a KS-153 camera system in bay two. The KS-153 used a 610 mm (24") lens and was used for stand-off photography in the Persian Gulf. During Operation Desert Shield the KS-153 was used to monitor the no fly zones in Iraq.

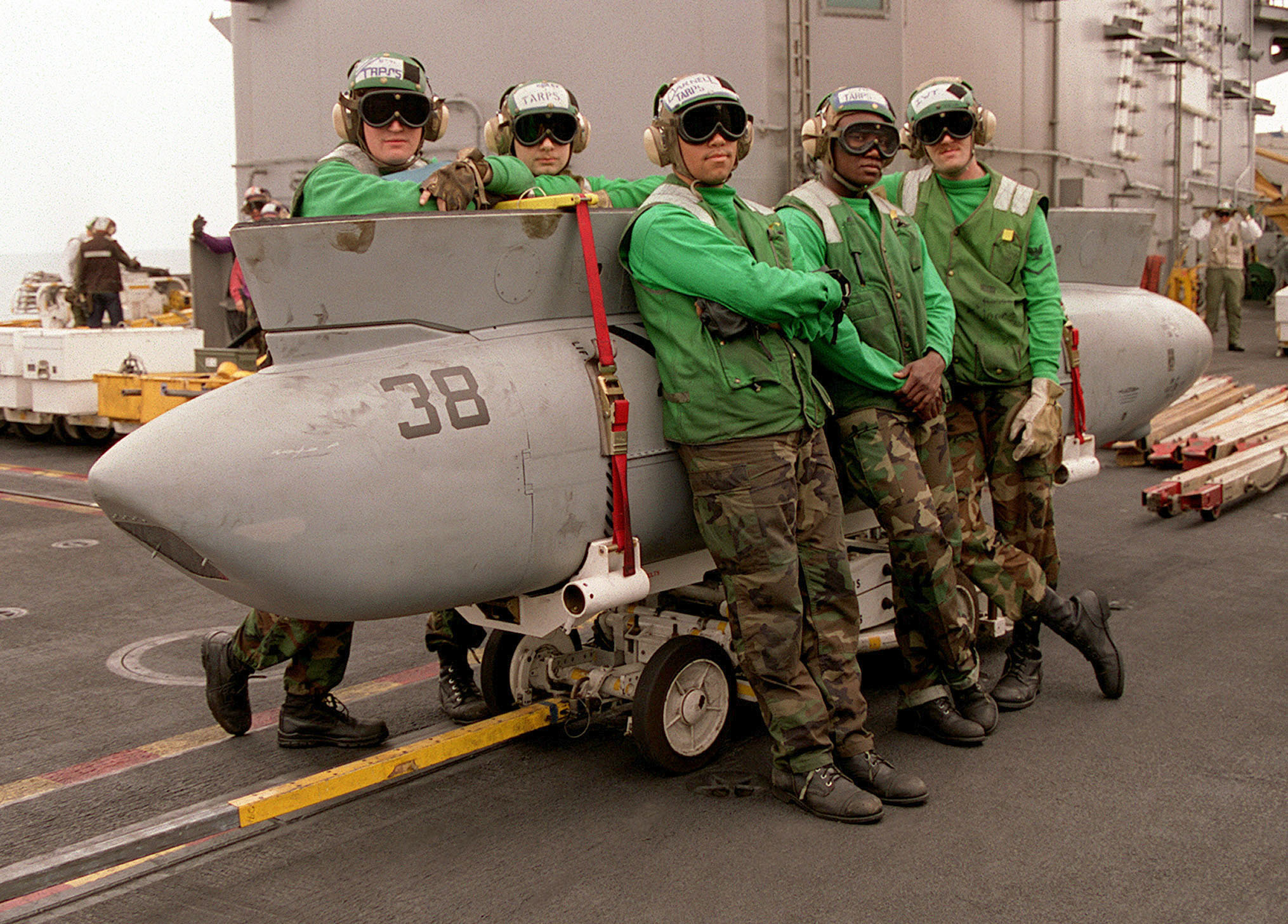
TARPS pod mounted on a skid with TARPS personnel

Tomcat TARPS squadrons were staffed with Navy photographer's mates and Avionics Technicians that maintained the cameras and worked with the carrier to process the imagery. TARPS squadrons also included an extra Intelligence officer and Intelligence Specialists to help plan TARPS missions and exploit the imagery afterwards. The TARPS shop maintained the cameras and removed or loaded the pod when and if needed. Wet film processing was conducted in a processing room connected to the ship's Intelligence Center (CVIC) where the Intelligence Specialists has a dedicated space with a light table for analyzing the hundreds of feet of film and exploiting the data.

== TARPS missions ==
The TARPS pod provided capability for the Tomcat to conduct a variety of reconnaissance tasking including:

- mapping (the Tomcat software was also upgraded to assist with this demanding and painstaking mission)
- pre and post strike bomb damage assessment
- standoff oblique photography
- maritime ship surveillance

== Upgrades ==
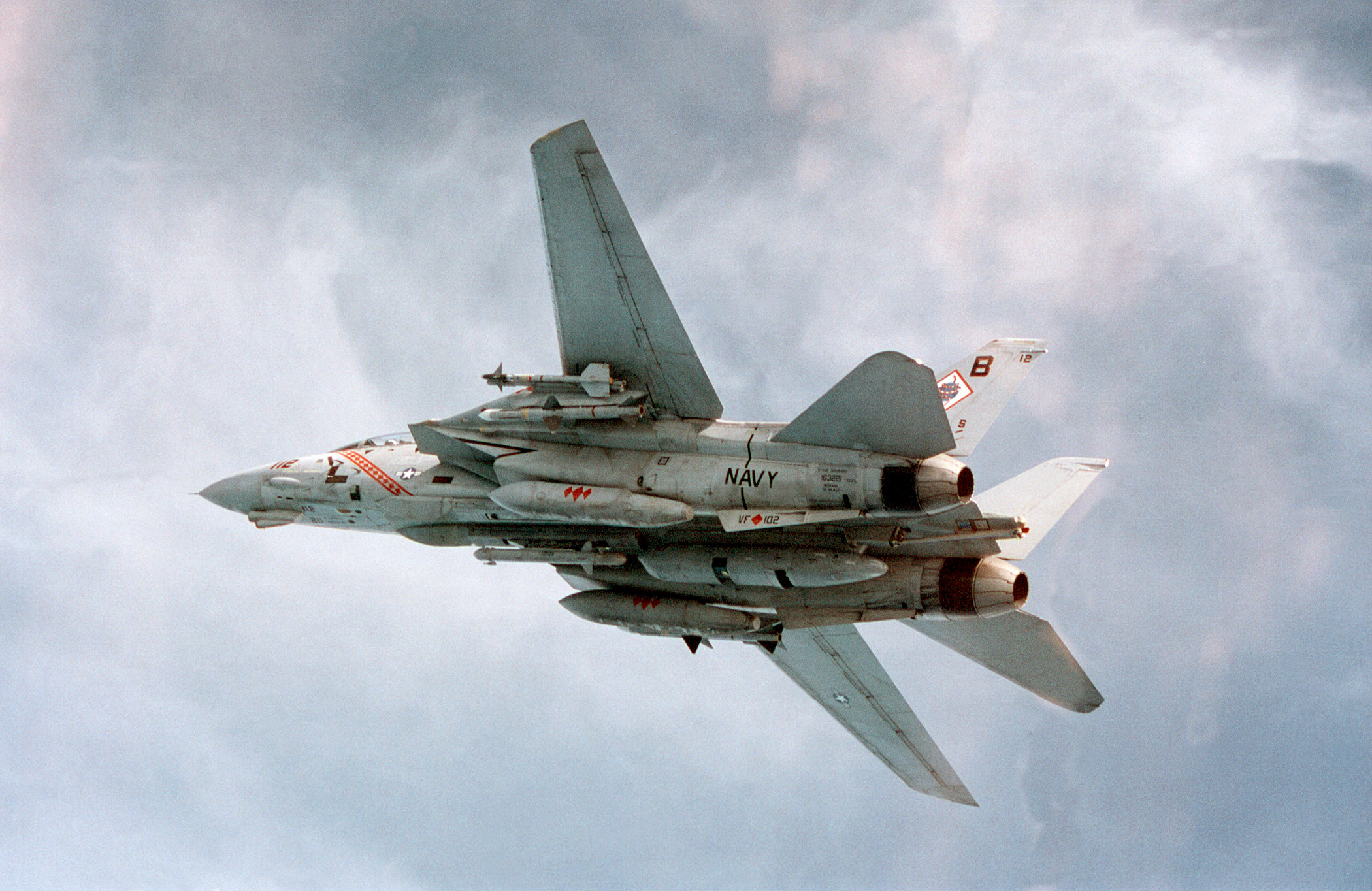
VF-102 F-14 Tomcat seen carrying a combat TARPS loadout including ECA and ALQ-167

Although TARPS was originally planned to be an interim solution, combat experience with VF-32 over Lebanon in 1983 resulted in upgrades to the TARPS camera suite and to the aircraft survivability. Since the KA-99 camera was designed for low-medium altitude missions, the Tomcats were forced to fly as low as 10,000 feet (3,000 m) over active anti-aircraft artillery (AAA) and surface to air missile (SAM) sites in the Bekaa Valley, again by VF-32, resulting in 6th Fleet requesting higher altitude cameras such as had been available in the dedicated reconnaissance platforms such as the RA-5C, RF-8 and RF-4. As a result, the first set of four KA-93 910 mm (36") focal length Long Range Optic (LOROP) cameras were shipped to Naval Air Station Oceana in the spring of 1984 for deployment with the next Tomcat TARPS squadron. VF-102 conducted an operational evaluation (OPEVAL) of the cameras enroute to the MED in expectation of flying them over Lebanon, but the crisis had cooled down by then. The cameras then became forward deployed assets and cross-decked between TARPS squadrons. Later, KS-153 LOROP cameras were also procured and also used as forward deployed assets. The KS-87 camera bay was eventually upgraded with a digital sensor so that imagery could be captured onto a PCMCIA Type II card for debrief, but could also be transmitted as desired by the RIO.

The TARPS mission first exposed the Tomcat to the AAA and SAM threat on a routine basis and spurred upgrades not only to the cameras, but to the aircraft itself. The existing Radar Homing and Warning (RHAW) gear, the ALR-45/50, was vintage Vietnam era and could not keep up with the latest threats of the SA-5 and SA-6 missiles, both present in several threat countries in the Mediterranean. As such, TARPS Tomcats were provided with an Expanded Chaff Adapter (ECA) rail that provided 120 extra expendable rounds and another rail that mounted an ALQ-167 "Bullwinkle" jammer. Eventually, the F-14B arrived with the improved ALR-67 RHAW gear capable of keeping pace with the latest threats. Prior to that, some Tomcat squadrons used modified "Fuzz-buster" automotive police radar detectors mounted ad hoc on the pilot's glare shield to detect threats not handled by the ALR-45/50.

== Operational history ==
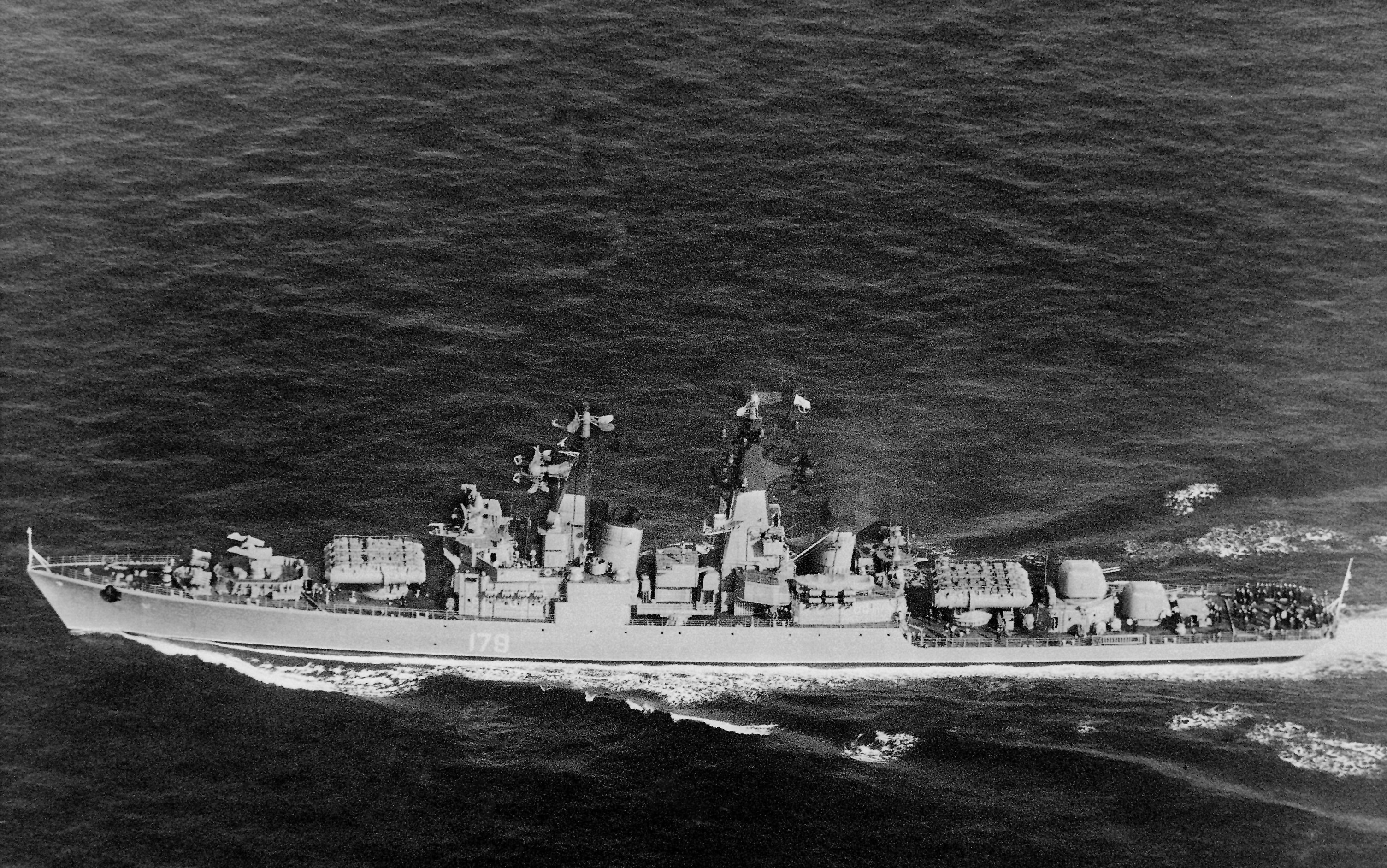
Classic TARPS image of a Soviet Kynda-class cruiser during the Cold War

TARPS was immediately impressed into the Cold War and used for surveillance of Soviet ships at sea and in their anchorages sometimes from over 1,000 miles (1,600 km) distant from patrolling aircraft carriers in the classic cat and mouse tactics of that era.

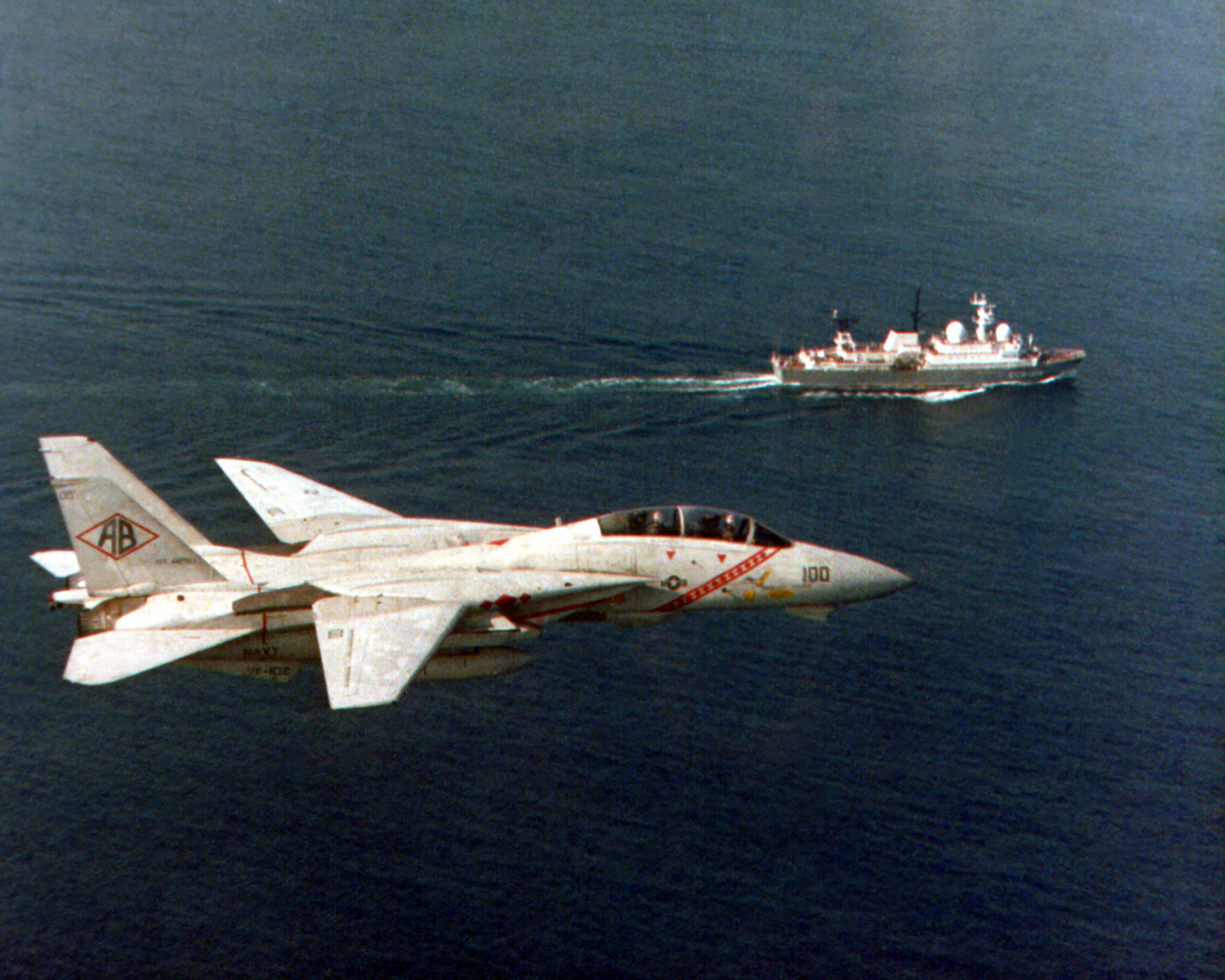
VF-102 TARPS mission to keep an eye on Soviet Balzam intelligence gathering ship attempting to shadow NATO maneuvers in 1985.

TARPS resulted in Tomcats being put in harm's way shortly after it was introduced to the fleet in 1981. VF-102 Tomcats had been inadvertently been fired on by AAA and a single SA-2 SAM over Somalia in April 1983 while conducting peacetime mapping prior to a major exercise. A few months later VF-32 conducted TARPS missions in support of the invasion of Grenada and went on to join VF-143 and VF-31 in flying missions in the Eastern Med where three carriers had gathered to respond to the crisis in Lebanon. Thus, TARPS was responsible for the Tomcat's first sustained combat baptism of fire when the crisis in Lebanon heated up in 1983 requiring daily overflights over hostile AAA and SAMs. During Operation El Dorado Canyon in 1986, Libya launched SCUD missiles at a US outpost on an island in the Mediterranean and VF-102 flew TARPS to ascertain if there had been any damage.

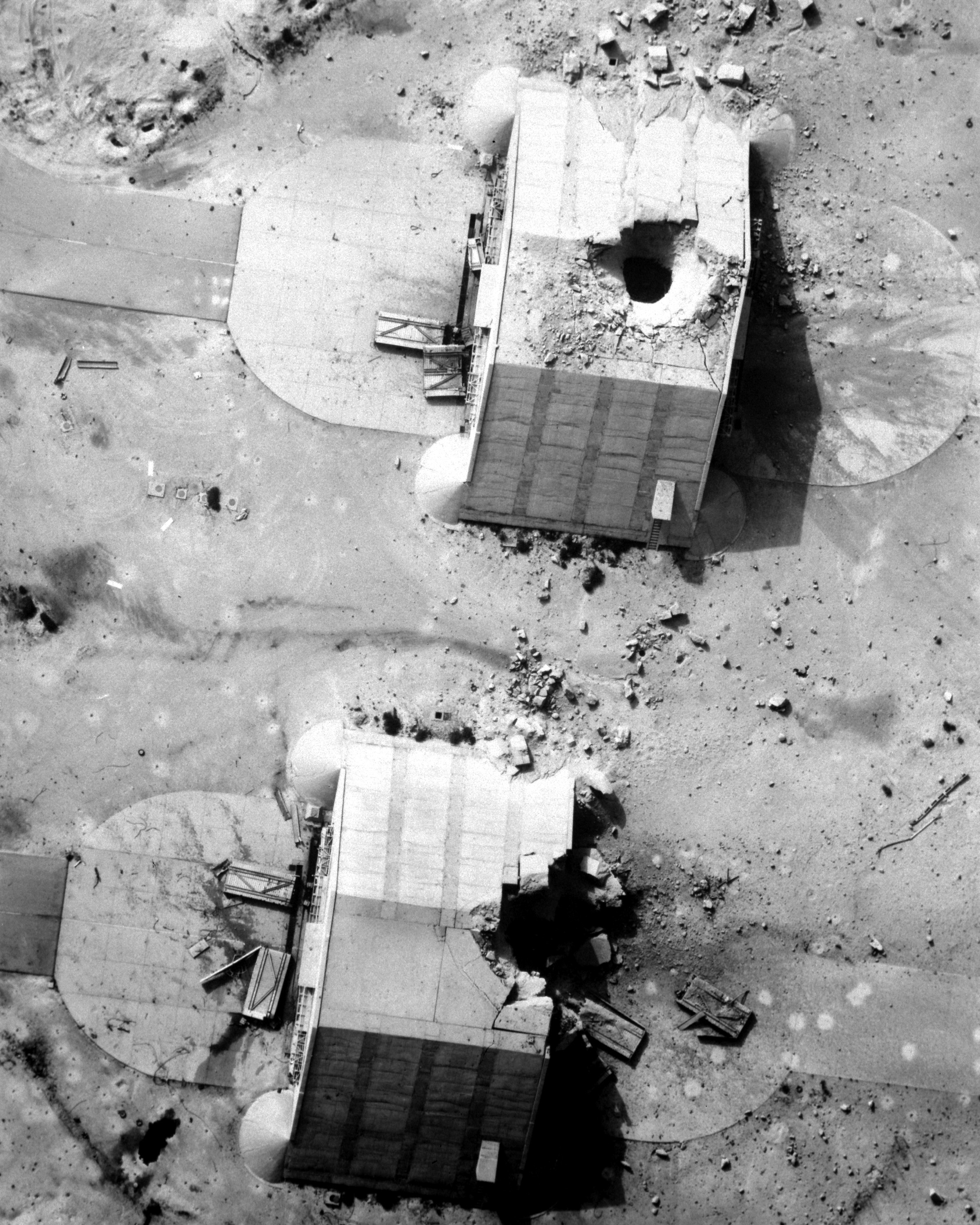
TARPS image of results after F-117 precision bunker busting during Operation Desert Storm

Initially, TARPS was not a priority on the air tasking order during Desert Shield/Storm due to availability of strategic assets like the U-2/TR-1 and plentiful USAF RF-4 units. However, once Desert Storm started, the demand for realtime intel overwhelmed the other assets and TARPS missions were called upon to meet the demand. Immediately, it became obvious that Tomcats were favored for in country missions over the RF-4 as they required no escort and needed less fuel pre- and post-mission, which was a real concern at the time. TARPS continued to be utilized post Desert Storm and training was modified to take into account medium altitude tactics such as were flown in Desert Storm. Prior to that, the majority of TARPS missions training missions were low altitude overland and over water navigation and imagery. Only mapping was flown at medium altitudes. TARPS was used routinely in Operation Southern Watch over Iraq and called upon in Bosnia in 1995 and then again over Kosovo in 1999. The advent of LANTIRN into Tomcat operations provided a useful complement to TARPS. Since both systems need the same real estate in the rear cockpit for sensor operation control panels, they cannot be mounted on the aircraft at the same time, but they can be flown in formation yielding the best of both systems.

TARPS was used in the United States in 1993 when areas of the Mississippi River flooded. The Federal Emergency Management Agency (FEMA) requested TARPS flights be taken over the area to determine which locations were hardest hit. TARPS has also been used for hurricane damage assessment. TARPS was also used to assess damages following the Waco siege in 1993, as well as damage to the Alfred P. Murrah Federal Building following the Oklahoma City bombing. In addition, TARPS equipped F-14s were used for DEA intel missions for anti-drug operations in the early 1990s.
