= VFA-102 =

Strike Fighter Squadron 102
- Founded: 1 July 1955; 71 years ago
- Country: United States
- Branch: United States Navy
- Type: Fighter/Attack
- Role: Close air support Air interdiction Aerial reconnaissance
- Part of: Carrier Air Wing Five
- Garrison/HQ: MCAS Iwakuni
- Nickname: "Diamondbacks"
- Motto: BASCT
- Engagements: Vietnam War; Operation Prairie Fire; Operation El Dorado Canyon; Gulf War; Operation Southern Watch; Operation Restore Hope; Operation Deny Flight; Operation Deliberate Force; Operation Enduring Freedom; Operation Epic Fury

Commanders
- Commanding Officer: Josephy
- Executive Officer: Joseph
- Command Master Chief: Millard

Aircraft flown
- Fighter: F2H Banshee; F4D Skyray; F-4 Phantom; F-14 Tomcat; F/A-18F Super Hornet

Strike Fighter Squadron 102 (VFA-102) is a United States Navy Strike Fighter squadron based at Marine Corps Air Station Iwakuni. Their call sign is Diamond, with the tail code NF, and they fly the F/A-18F Super Hornet. They are a part of Carrier Air Wing 5 and are attached to the aircraft carrier USS George Washington.

== Name and insignia ==
The unit's name derives of the diamondback rattlesnake, indigenous to their original 'stomping grounds', a venomous reptile known to be fierce territorial defender. The motto of the unit is "BASCT".

The insignia is a white lozenge or diamond, with the earth in the center in blue and black, wrapped in the coils of a red and white diamondback snake, with its rattle tail pointing to the base of the lozenge - often mistaken for the 'Don't Tread on Me' sigil, which shows a black rattlesnake coiled on the ground instead. This is usually encircled in red with white trim, a band below stating the unit's name and number.

All aircraft from the F-4 onward feature a diamondback pattern band below the cockpit slanted backwards towards the bottom of the forward fuselage on their schemes, with the hi-vis being in red and white color, the lo-vis in grey. Other bands were put on the dorsal section on earlier aircraft or on the vertical stabilizer and tail.

== History ==
Two distinct squadrons have been designated VF-102. The first VF-102 was established on 1 May 1952 and redesignated VA-36 on 1 July 1955.

The second VF-102 was established in 1955, was eventually redesignated as VFA-102, and is the subject of the remainder of this article.

=== 1950s ===
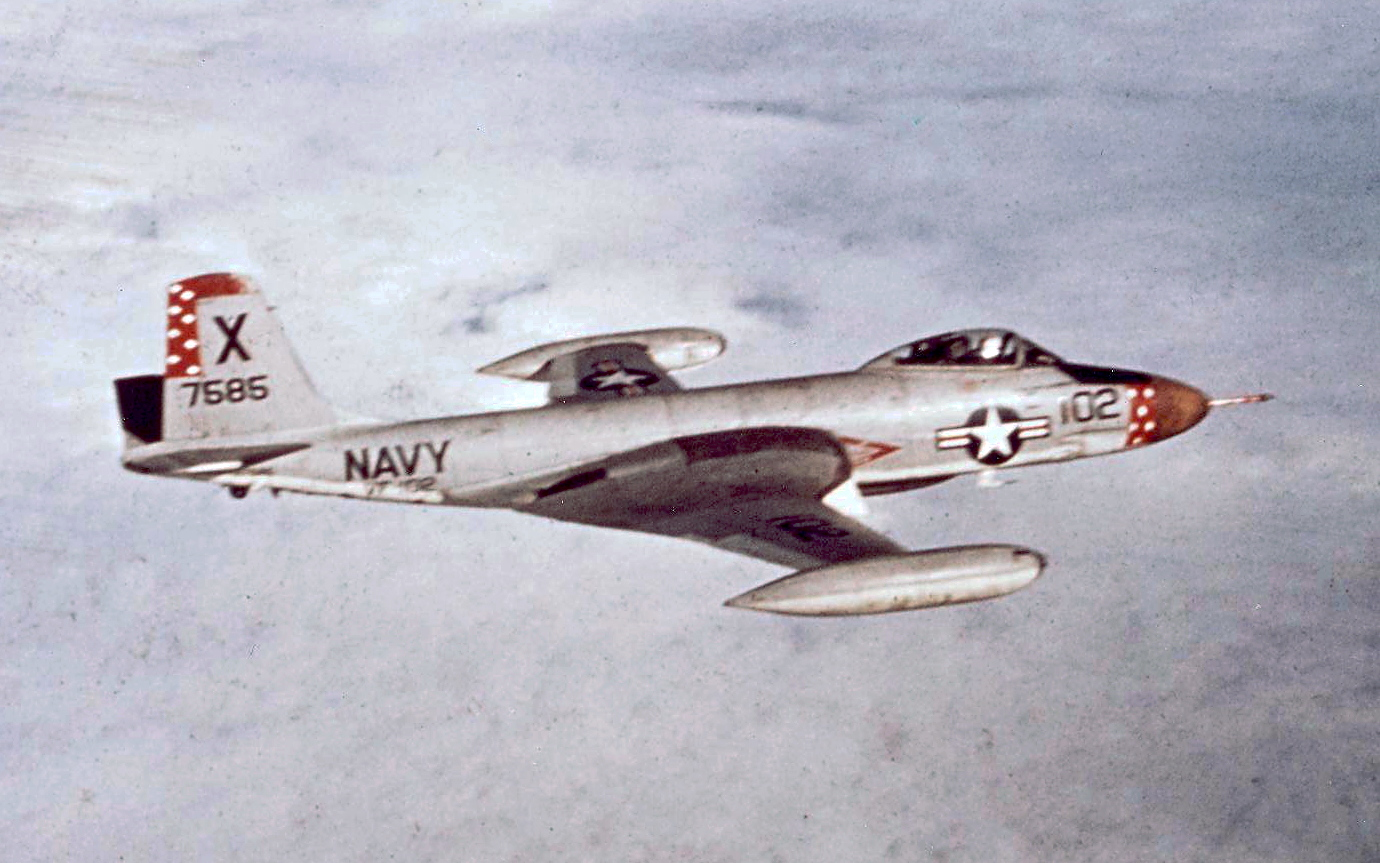
VF-102 F2H-4 Banshee in 1956

Fighter Squadron 102 (VF-102), was established as VA-36 on 1 July 1955, and was immediately redesignated VF-102 on the same day (at the time, squadron designations were associated with their assigned airwing). The squadron was based at NAS Jacksonville flying the F2H Banshee. The squadron's inaugural cruise took place aboard USS Randolph in July 1956. After returning from deployment, the squadron transitioned to the F4D Skyray. In addition to four 20 mm internal cannons, the Skyray carried the new AIM-9 Sidewinder missile.

=== 1960s ===
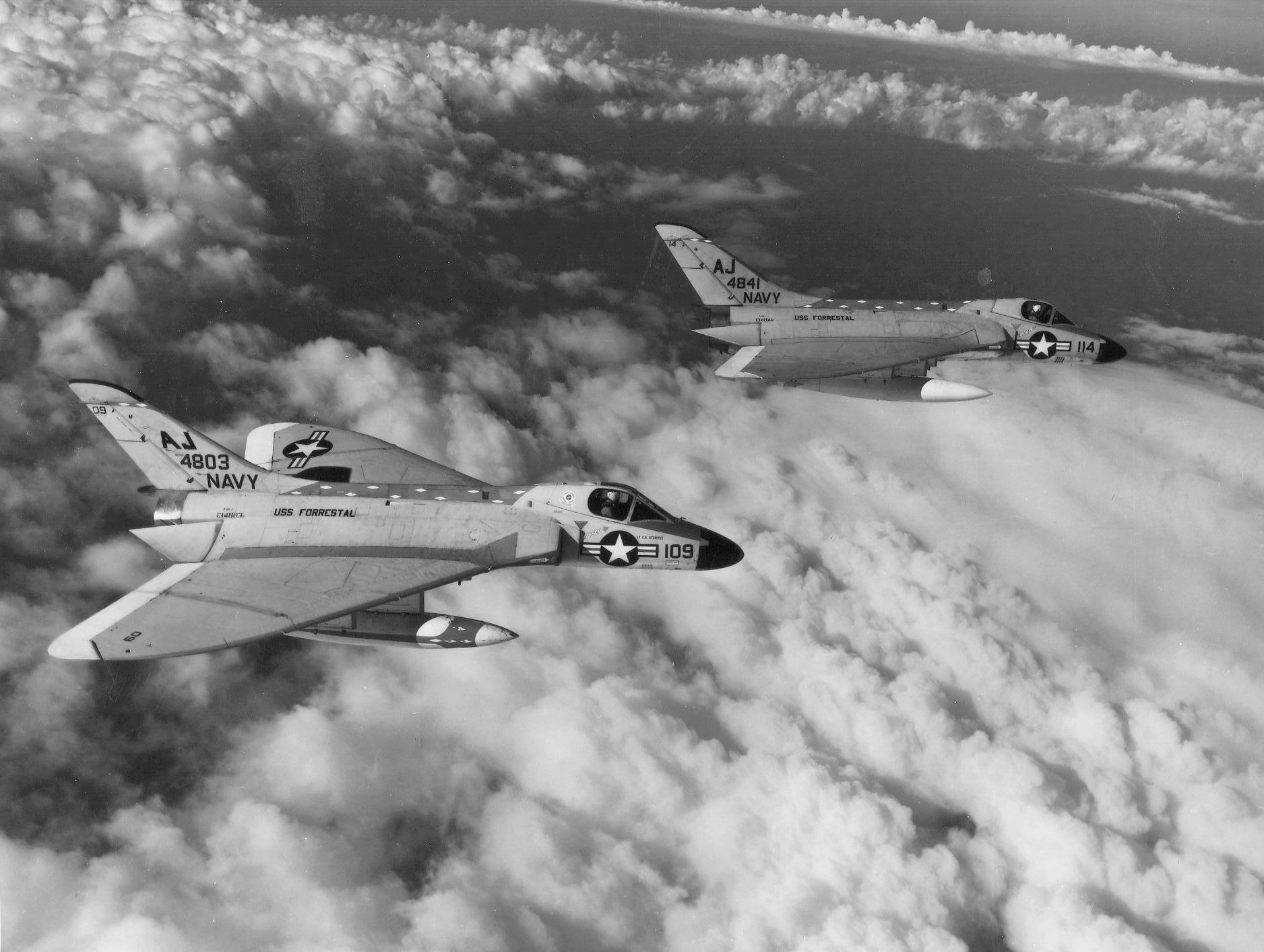
VF-102 F4D-1s in 1960

The final cruise with the Skyray on Forrestal was January through August 1961 after the squadron had moved to NAS Oceana, Virginia. It subsequently transitioned to the F-4 Phantom beginning a 20-year association with the Phantom.

In 1964 and 1966 VF-102 won the COMNAVAIRLANT Battle "E" efficiency awards. Highlights during this period included participation in Operation Sea Orbit on board USS Enterprise, and combat operations off Vietnam in 1968.

=== 1970s ===
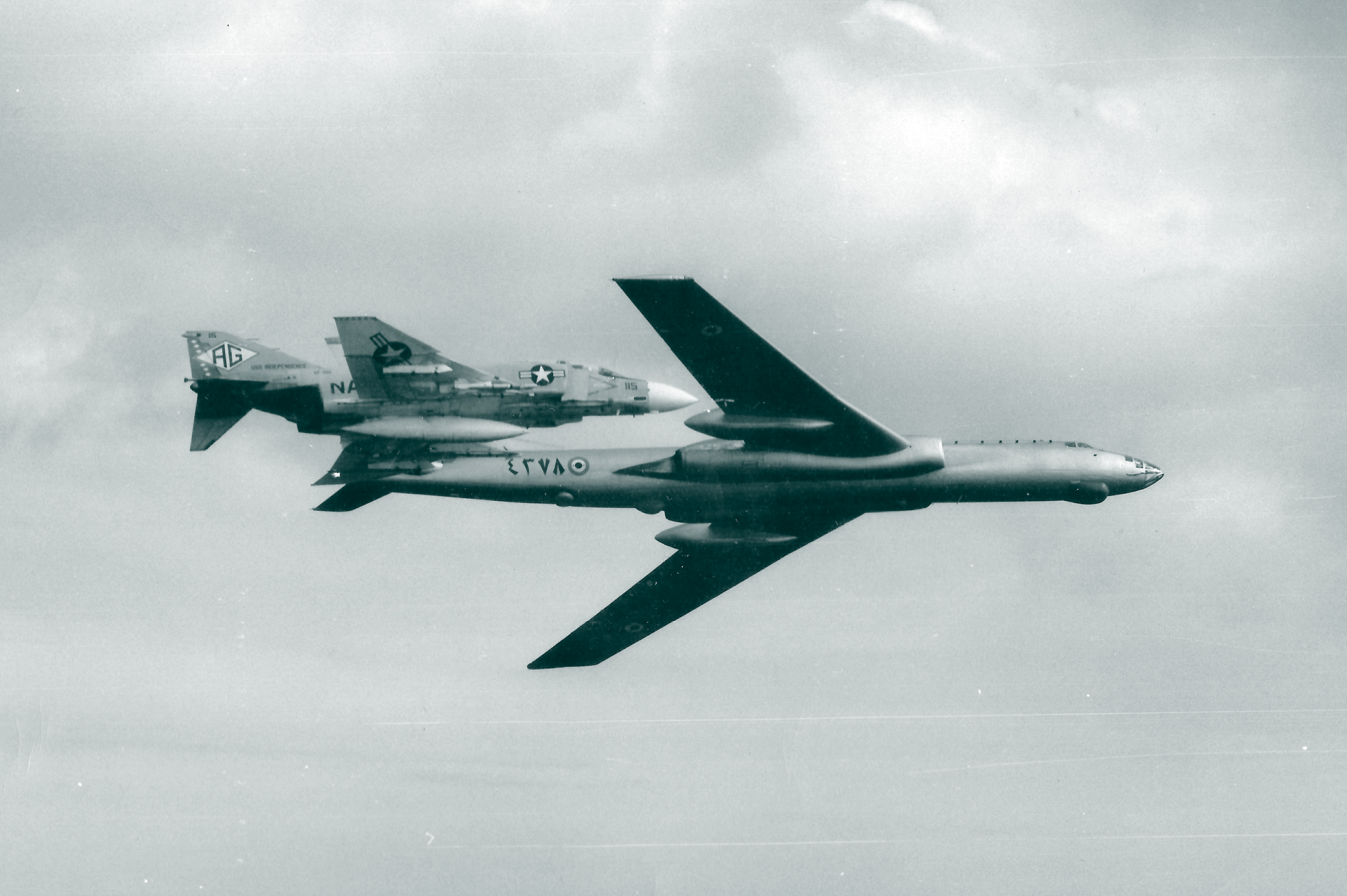
An F-4 Phantom from VF-102 intercepting an Egyptian Air Force Tupolev TU-16 Badger over the Mediterranean Sea on 12 January 1971.

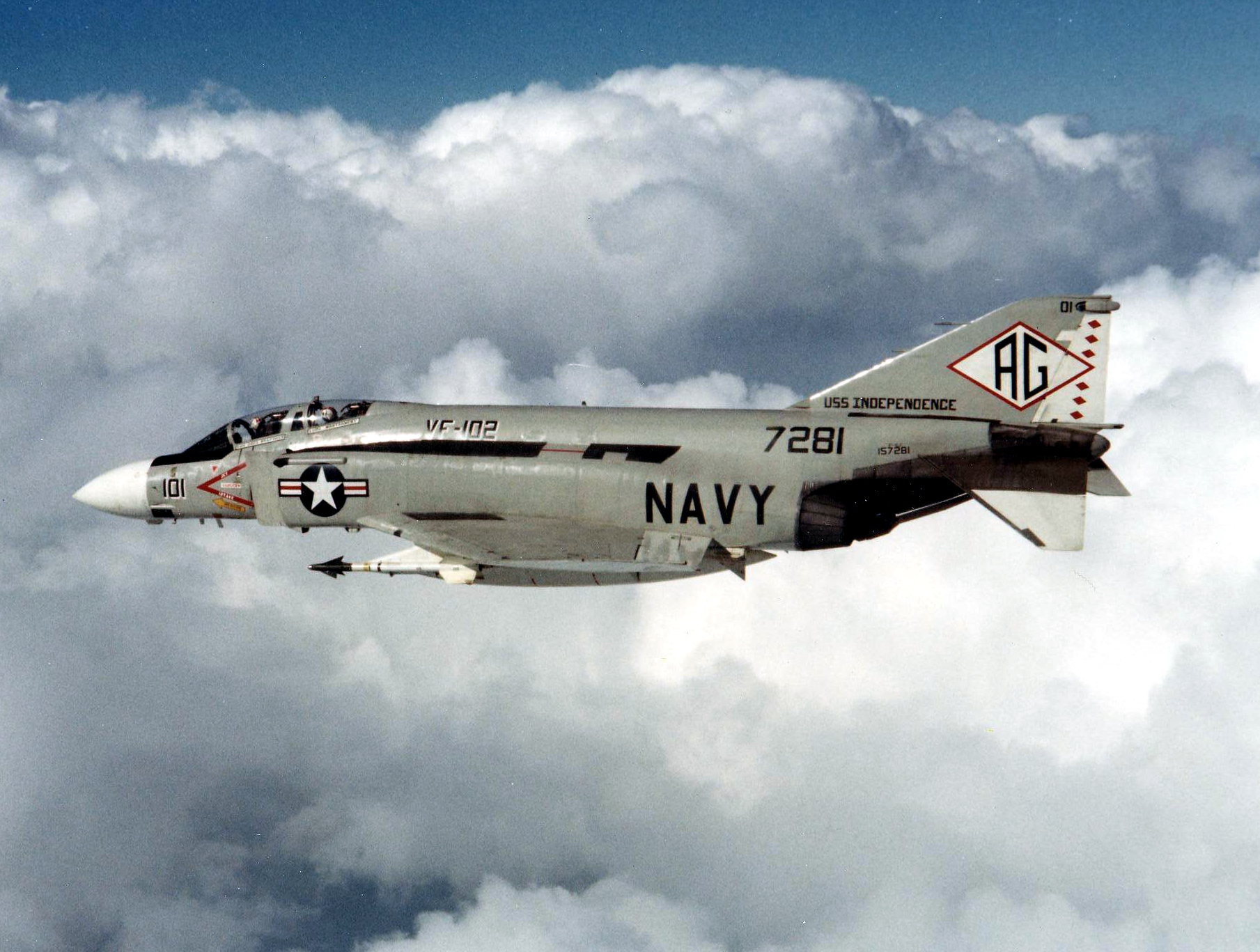
VF-102 F-4J Phantom II circa 1977

In 1975 and 1978, VF-102 conducted cross-deck operations aboard HMS Ark Royal. In 1971, 1973, 1974, 1975: the squadron conducted four deployments to the Mediterranean Sea aboard USS Independence as part of Carrier Air Wing Seven, including a port call in Athens, Greece, when they had a political coup; air cover operations during the Yom Kippur War; and recovery of aircraft debris and bodies from TWA Flight 841 that crashed into the Mediterranean Sea after a terrorist bomb exploded in the hold.

=== 1980s ===
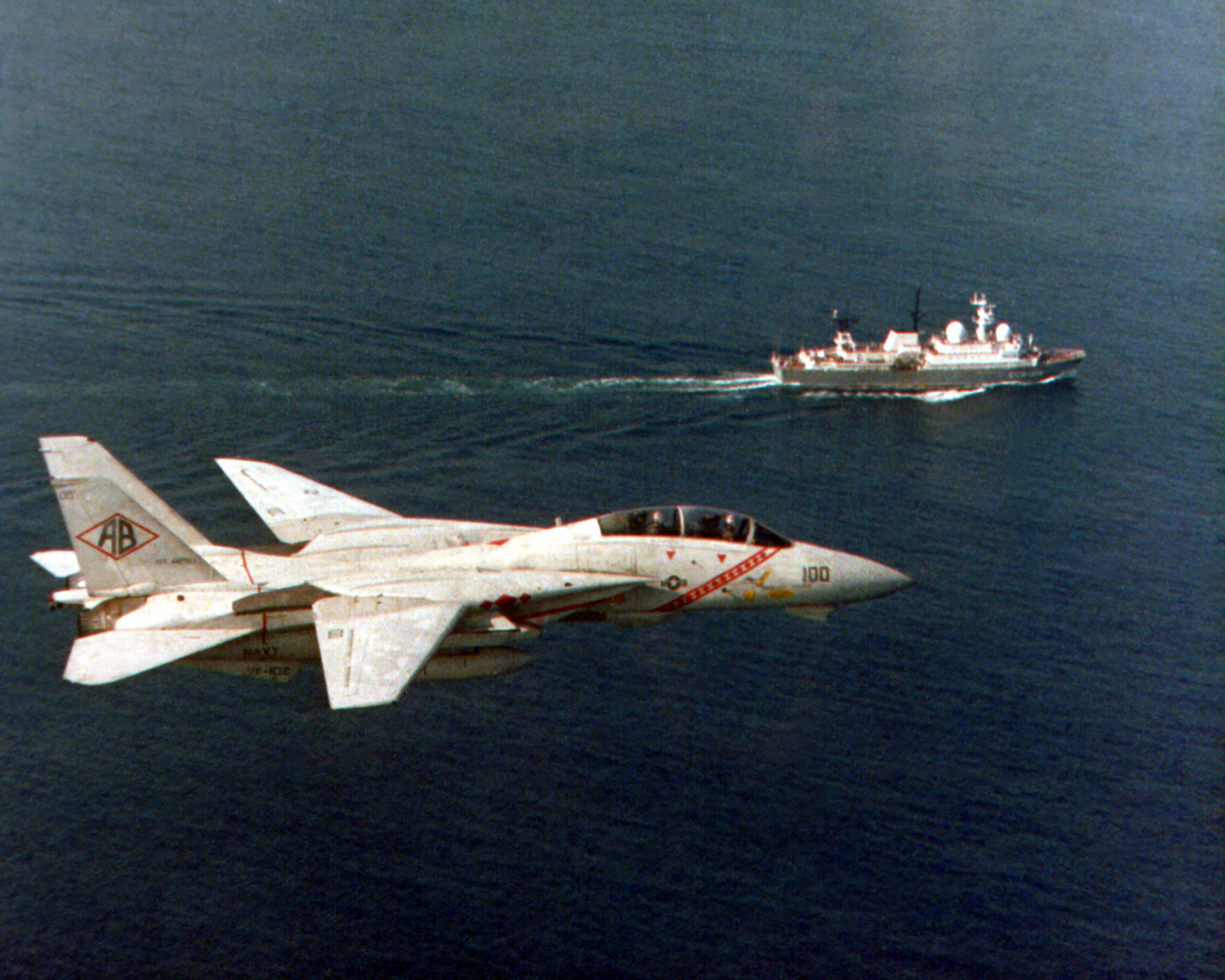
VF-102 TARPS F-14A Tomcat tracks a Soviet Balzam SIGINT ship attempting to shadow NATO maneuvers in 1985

In June 1981 the squadron flew their last Phantom during an Indian Ocean cruise aboard USS Independence. During the summer of 1981, the squadron transitioned to the F-14A Tomcat. With the new aircraft, the squadron also received a new mission in addition to their traditional fighter role—photo reconnaissance using the TARPS pod. The squadron deployed aboard USS America in late 1982 to participate in the NATO Exercise Northern Wedding that required high temperature operations in the heavy seas north of the British Isles, garnering considerable attention from Soviet Tu-95D Bear reconnaissance aircraft. The first Tomcat deployment with Carrier Air Wing One began in 1983 and took USS America through the Suez Canal to the Indian Ocean. Two VF-102 Tomcats, flying a routine TARPS mission over Somalia were fired upon by an SA-2 SAM site and AAA in April 1983. Both aircraft returned without damage.

VF-102 deployed in 1984 with the first KA-93 LOROP camera and ARC-182 Have Quick radios, conducting Operational Evaluation for both systems at sea. In 1985, USS America participated in the NATO exercise Ocean Safari and again conducted operations in the challenging seas and low visibility conditions near the Arctic Circle and inside Vestfjord, Norway. While operating northwest of Ireland, a VF-102 TARPS aircrew flew an unprecedented 1200 nm TARPS mission to locate a Soviet Kynda-class cruiser transiting the English Channel. In March 1986, the squadron deployed on board USS America, headed for the Gulf of Sidra joining USS Saratoga and USS Coral Sea to challenge the Libyan proclaimed Line of Death. A VF-102 Tomcat was first to be fired on by a Libyan SA-5 and AAA while flying Combat Air Patrol for Operation Attain Document. A month later VF-102 flew cover for US Navy and US Air Force bombers in Operation El Dorado Canyon.

=== 1990s ===
In late 1990, USS America joined USS John F. Kennedy and Saratoga in the Red Sea as part of Operation Desert Shield, arriving the day operations were to begin. USS America remained part of the Red Sea Battle Force until directed to join USS Ranger, USS Theodore Roosevelt and USS Midway in the Persian Gulf. In the six-week campaign, VF-102 logged more than 1400 combat flight hours.

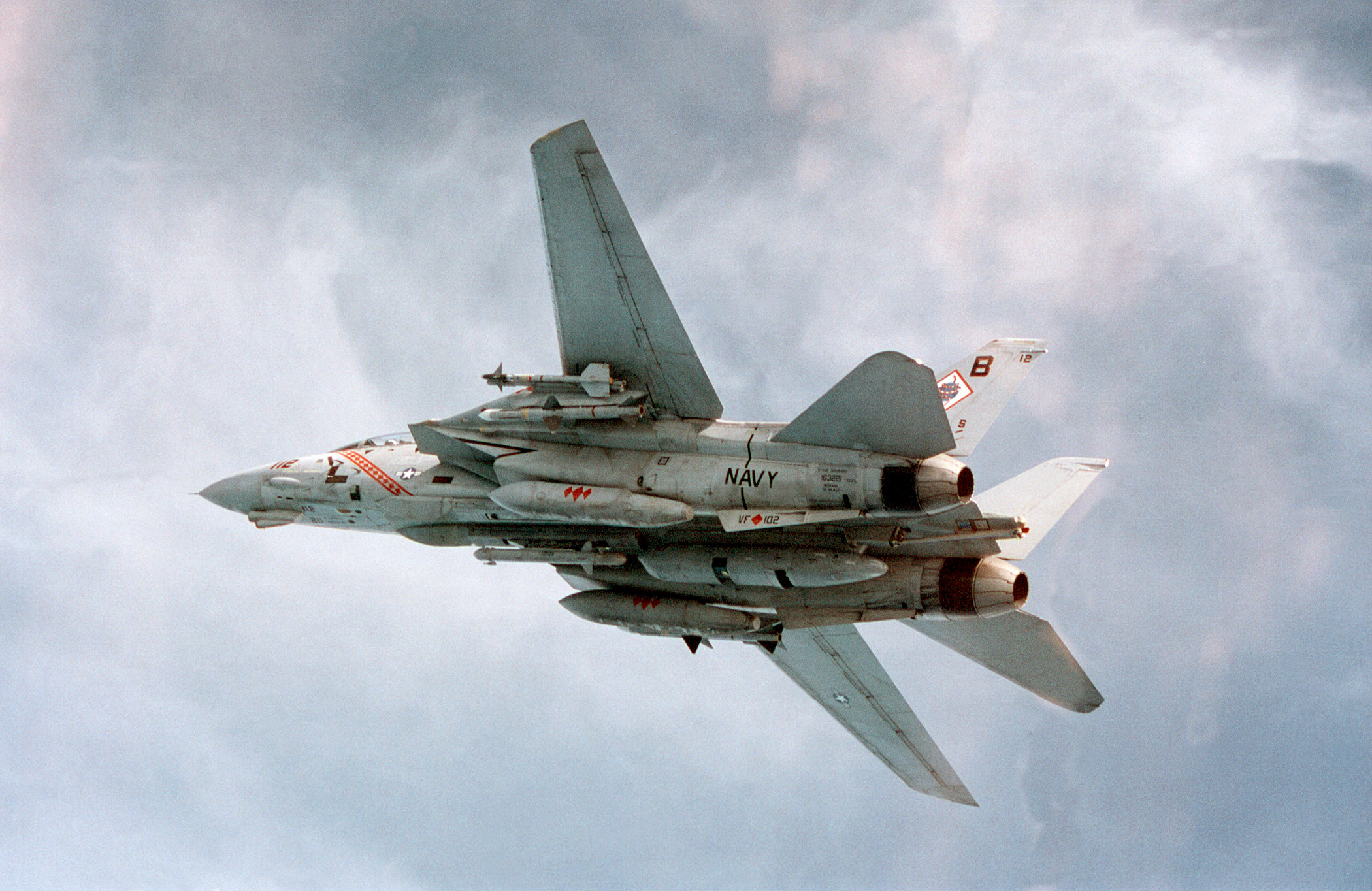
VF-102 F-14B Tomcat carrying TARPS loadout including ECA and ALQ-167

The squadron embarked on USS America again in December 1991 for a six-month deployment to the Mediterranean and Persian Gulf.

In early August 1993, the squadron embarked on USS America to begin their third Mediterranean deployment in three years. During this deployment the squadron conducted humanitarian operations off the coast of Bosnia-Herzegovina supporting Operation Provide Promise and Operation Deny Flight. In late October the squadron supported Operation Restore Hope off the coast of Mogadishu, Somalia. By mid-December they were supporting Operation Southern Watch in Iraq. During this deployment the Diamondbacks were the first F-14 squadron in the Navy to deploy with the new carrier airwing model of only one Tomcat squadron per airwing. VF-102's sister squadron, VF-33, The Starfighters were disestablished in late 1993. Fleet wide as the Navy made the transition to the new airwing model, most of the Tomcat Squadrons that were TARPS Pod capable were kept in service while most of the other Tomcat Squadrons that were not TARPS Pod capable saw themselves being diestablished. As VF-102 was the lone Tomcat Squadron for CVW-1 onboard USS America, they absorbed additional F-14A's into the squadron. Prior to leaving Norfolk in August of 93 they absorbed additional Tomcat's into the squadron bringing their total to 14 from the previous number of 9 aircraft. Additional Pilots and RIO's were brought into the squadron as well to handle the increased work load within the airwing. During this deployment the Diamondbacks of VF-102 achieved a record 98.7% sortie completion rate for the deployment. A record that still stands today.

In February 1994, the squadron returned to NAS Oceana and transitioned to the F-14B aircraft. The squadron's 1995–1996 Mediterranean cruise began with an emergency sortie to the Adriatic Sea to take part in Operation Deliberate Force. They then proceeded to the Persian Gulf in support of Operation Southern Watch. Placement of U.S. ground forces in Bosnia, led to another America emergency sortie back to the Adriatic in December. The squadron remained in the Adriatic for the remainder of the cruise, logging more than 4,000 hours and over 1,900 traps during the deployment.

VF-102 completed its final deployment on 24 February 1996 as USS America's sole Tomcat squadron. Upon America's decommissioning in 1996, VF-102 (and the rest of CVW-1) was assigned to USS George Washington.

In 1997, the squadron deployed aboard George Washington. A port visit to Haifa, Israel, was cut short late in November as the carrier battle group was ordered to the Persian Gulf in response to Saddam Hussein's barring UN weapon inspectors from carrying out their assigned tasks. As the crisis grew George Washington joined USS Nimitz and HMS Invincible. VF-102 returned to Norfolk on 13 March 1998.

In Autumn 1999, VF-102 deployed again to the Persian Gulf in support of Operation Southern Watch over southern Iraq. VF-102 carried out strikes on numerous anti-aircraft and radar sites and conducted numerous TARPS missions.

=== 2000s ===
On 19 September 2001 in the wake of the September 11 attacks, VF-102 began a scheduled deployment to the Arabian Sea as a part of Operation Enduring Freedom and began combat operations. During that deployment VF-102 flew 5,000 combat hours and dropped 680 bombs as well as guiding more than 50,000 pounds of precision guided munitions launched by other aircraft, VF-102 dropped more ordnance and flew more combat hours than any other F-14 unit during the war in 2001 and 2002. In addition, as part of the USS Theodore Roosevelt Battle Group they were at sea for 159 consecutive days, breaking a 20-year-old record.

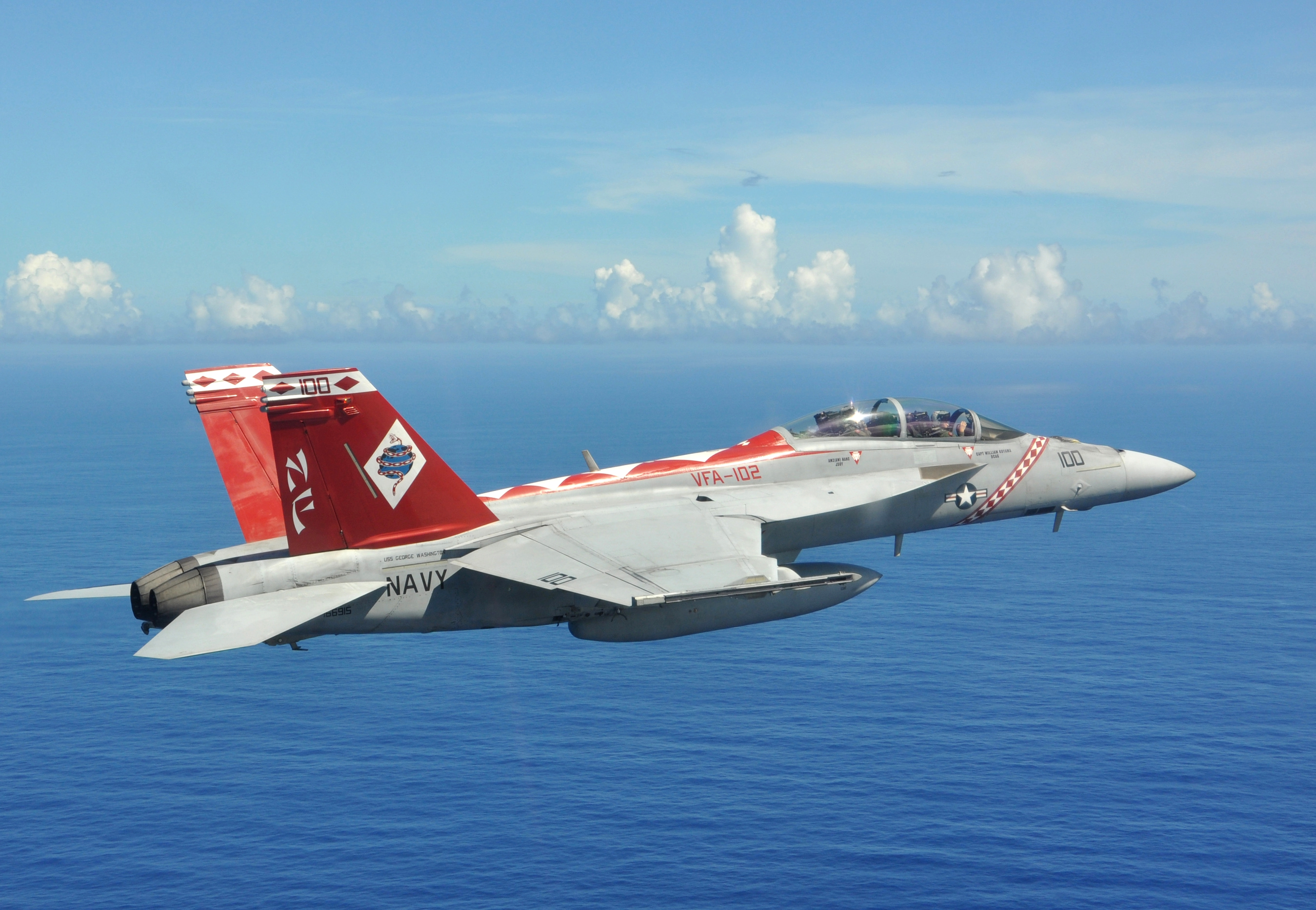
VFA-102 F/A-18F Super Hornet in 2013

Following the return from deployment, the squadron moved to NAS Lemoore, California to begin transition training in the F/A-18F. Upon completion, the squadron again changed homeport to Naval Air Facility Atsugi, Japan.

VFA-102 deployed to the Pacific Ocean aboard USS Kitty Hawk in 2004, 2005, 2006 and 2007, taking part in several military exercises, including Orange Crush, Talisman Saber, Jasex, and Valiant Shield.

In March 2008, VFA-102 was named the Pacific Fleet Battle "E" award winner for the calendar year of 2007, recognizing their readiness to perform wartime tasks amongst all F/A-18E/F squadrons in the Pacific Fleet. In March 2010, the squadron was again awarded the Pacific Fleet Battle "E".

In the spring of 2008, VFA-102 embarked on USS Kitty Hawk for her final deployment. Following a crossdeck in San Diego, the air wing is currently assigned to USS George Washington.

In 2010, the squadron transitioned to Block II Super Hornets equipped with the AN/APG-79 AESA radar.

In 2021, VFA-102 flew combat missions into Afghanistan as part of the US's Afghanistan retrograde.

In March of 2025, VFA-102's F/A-18F Block II's were replaced with modernized F/A-18F Block III's.

In August 2026, VFA-102 as part of CVW-5 onboard the USS George Washington arrived in the CENTCOM AOR. VFA-102 and their F/A-18Fs then began undertaking combat missions against Iran within Operation Epic Fury.

== See also ==
- Naval aviation
- Modern US Navy carrier air operations
- List of United States Navy aircraft squadrons
- List of Inactive United States Navy aircraft squadrons
