= Diamondback =

Diamondback may refer to:

== Animals ==
- Eastern diamondback rattlesnake, Crotalus adamanteus
- Western diamondback rattlesnake, Crotalus atrox
- Diamondback moth, a European moth that has spread to North America
- Diamondback terrapin, a turtle, the state reptile of Maryland
- Diamondback water snake, a common species of water snake in North America

== Arts and media ==
- Diamondback (Willis Stryker), a supervillain and arch-enemy of Luke Cage
- Diamondback (Rachel Leighton), a supervillain turned superhero and supporting character of Captain America
- Diamondback (game), a fictional card game from the Cerebus comics
- The Diamondback, the official student newspaper of the University of Maryland, College Park

== Organizations ==
- Arizona Diamondbacks, a Major League Baseball team since 1998
- Chandler Diamondbacks, an Arizona Fall League baseball team that operated during 1992–1994
- Diamondback Energy, a company engaged in hydrocarbon exploration headquartered in Midland, Texas
- Diamondback Bicycles, American bicycle maker
- VFA-102 Diamondbacks, a U.S. Navy strike fighter squadron

== Technology ==
- Diamondback (missile), a U.S. Navy missile concept of the 1950s
- Colt Diamondback, a double-action revolver
- Diamondback, a computer mouse created by Razer USA Ltd

== Other uses ==
- Diamond Back (Frontier City), a roller coaster at Frontier City in Oklahoma City, Oklahoma
- Diamondback (Kings Island), a roller coaster at Kings Island in Mason, Ohio

== See also ==
- "Diamond in the Back", a 2004 single by rapper Ludacris
