= Task Force 60 =

Task Force 60 (TF-60)
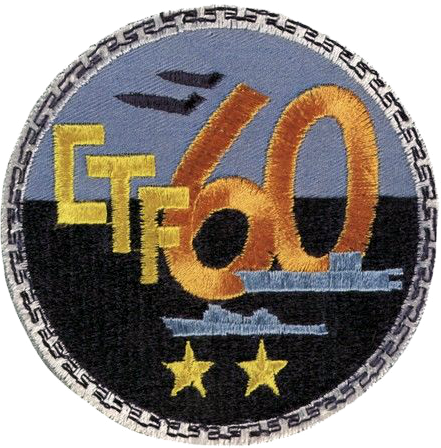
- Commander Task Force 60 insignia
- Active: 1950–present
- Country: United States of America
- Branch: United States Navy
- Type: Task Force
- Role: Naval air/surface/strike/anti-aircraft warfare
- Part of: United States Sixth Fleet
- Engagements: 1958 Lebanon crisis Gulf of Sidra 1986; 1986 United States bombing of Libya; Operation Deliberate Force; NATO bombing of Yugoslavia; Iraq War

Commanders
- Notable commanders: Howard A. Yeagar; Valdemar Greene Lambert; Lawrence R. Geis; James L. Holloway III; Frederick C. Turner; Forrest S. Petersen; James E. Service; David E. Jeremiah; Henry H. Mauz, Jr. William J. Fallon; Jay L. Johnson; John D. Stufflebeem

Task Force 60 is a task force of the United States Navy. It is often referred to by the abbreviation CTF 60 (Commander, Task Force 60). As of 2011 Task Force 60 will normally be the commander of Naval Task Force Europe and Africa. Any naval unit within the USEUCOM or USAFRICOM AOR may be assigned to TF 60 as required upon signal from the Commander of the Sixth Fleet.

The Task Force became definitely active on the establishment of the United States Sixth Fleet in 1952, but may have been active earlier, during World War II.

Task Force 60 was for many years the Sixth Fleet's Battle Force. When any carrier strike group enters into the Mediterranean control zone it is usually designated TF 60 and the battle group commander, a one or two-star flag officer, assumes duties as Commander Task Force 60 from Commander, Destroyer Squadron 60. The Task Force is often composed of one or more aircraft carriers, each with an accompanying complement of two to six cruisers and destroyers. On board the aircraft carrier is a Carrier air wing of 65–85 aircraft. This air wing is the primary striking arm of the Strike Group, and includes attack, fighter, anti-submarine, and reconnaissance aircraft.

From 8 to 13 October 1973, Task Group 60.1 with USS Independence (CV-62), Task Force 60.2 with Franklin D. Roosevelt, and Task Forces 61/62 with Guadalcanal (Amphibious Force and Landing Force) were alerted to prepare for possible evacuation contingencies in the Middle East as a result of the 1973 Yom Kippur War between Arab states and Israel. Independence operated off the island of Crete.

During the 1986 confrontation with Libya, that led to Operation El Dorado Canyon, the Sixth Fleet's battle force was under the command of Rear Admiral David E. Jeremiah. Task Group 60.1 under Rear Admiral J.C. Breast was made up of the Coral Sea and her escorts, Task Group 60.2 under Jeremiah, the Saratoga and her escorts, and Task Group 60.3 under Rear Admiral Henry H. Mauz, Jr., the America and her escorts. Task Group 60.5, the Surface Action Group under Captain Robert L. Goodwin, was made up of a missile cruiser, missile destroyer, and another destroyer.

In November 2007, Task Group 60.4 held the Africa Partnership Station role, embarked aboard the amphibious ship USS Fort McHenry. The HSV Swift was scheduled to join Fort McHenry in Africa in November 2007. In 2012, Task Group 60.5 was permanently assigned as the Southeast Africa Task Group. The Group may be renamed the South and East Africa Task Group. It held the alternate designation of Task Force 363.
