= VA-36 (U.S. Navy) =

Attack Squadron 36
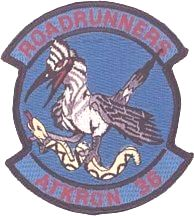
- VA-36 squadron insignia
- Active: 1 May 1952 – 1 August 1970
- Country: United States
- Branch: United States Navy
- Role: Attack
- Part of: Inactive
- Nickname(s): Roadrunners
- Engagements: Vietnam War

Aircraft flown
- Attack: FG-1D Corsair; F9F-5/B/8-B/T Panther; A4D-2/C/E Skyhawk

VA-36, nicknamed the Roadrunners, was an Attack Squadron of the United States Navy. It was established as Fighter Squadron VF-102 on 1 May 1952, redesignated VA-36 on 1 July 1955, and disestablished on 1 August 1970. It was the first squadron to be designated VA-36, the second VA-36 was established on 6 March 1987 and disestablished on 1 April 1994.

== Operational history ==
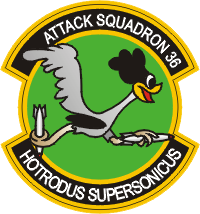
1965 version of "Roadrunners" emblem.

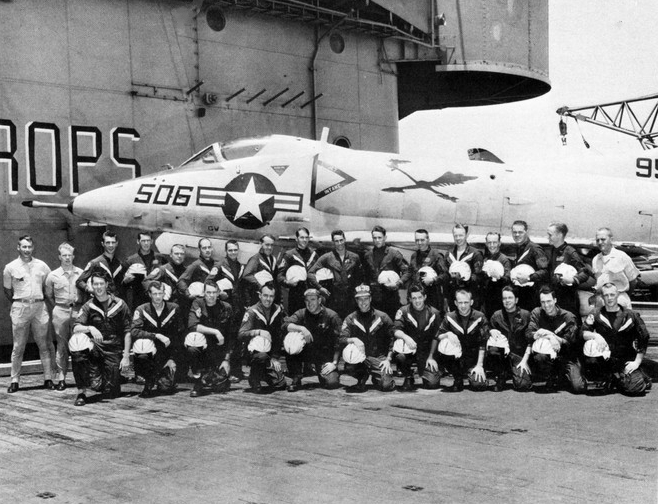
VA-36 pilots with an A-4C on USS Intrepid off Vietnam in 1968

- November 1953 – September 1954: During the squadron's world cruise aboard USS Tarawa, it visited 14 different ports in 10 foreign countries and transited the Suez and Panama Canals.
- July–August 1961: While deployed on a training cruise aboard USS Saratoga in the Caribbean Sea, the squadron was on an alert status due to the Bay of Pigs Invasion.
- 2 December 1965: The squadron conducted its first combat operations, flying from USS Enterprise on Dixie Station in the South China Sea off the coast of Vietnam. This marked the first time a nuclear powered ship had engaged in combat.
- December 1965 – June 1966: During this period of combat operations squadron personnel were awarded over 170 Air Medals.
- May–June 1967: VA-36, embarked on USS America, was on station in the eastern Mediterranean during the Six-Day War between Israel and Egypt, Jordan, and Syria. Units of America's air wing were launched to provide air cover for USS Liberty when it came under attack by Israeli forces.

== Home port assignments ==
The squadron was assigned to these home ports, effective on the dates shown:

- NAAS Cecil Field – 1 May 1952
- NAS Jacksonville – July 1955
- NAS Cecil Field – April 1956

== Aircraft assignment ==
The squadron first received the following aircraft in the months shown:

- FG-1D Corsair – May 1952
- F9F-5 Panther – Oct 1952
- F9F-8 & F9F-8B Panther – 2 Nov 1956
- F9F-8T Panther – 14 Apr 1957
- A4D-2 Skyhawk – 11 Sep 1958
- A4D-2N/A-4C Skyhawk – 21 Mar 1961 (The A4D-2N designation changed to A-4C in 1962.)
- A-4E Skyhawk – Oct 1967 (The squadron began its transition to A-4Es in October 1967 and in November 1967 transitioned back to A-4Cs)

== See also ==
- Attack aircraft
- History of the United States Navy
- List of inactive United States Navy aircraft squadrons
