= HNLMS Harlingen =

HNLMS Harlingen (Dutch: Hr.Ms. or Zr.Ms. Harlingen) may refer to the following ships of the Royal Netherlands Navy that have been named after Harlingen:

- HNLMS Harlingen (1983), an Alkmaar-class minehunter
- HNLMS Harlingen (M843), a Vlissingen-class mine countermeasures vessel
