= Henry H. Mauz Jr. =

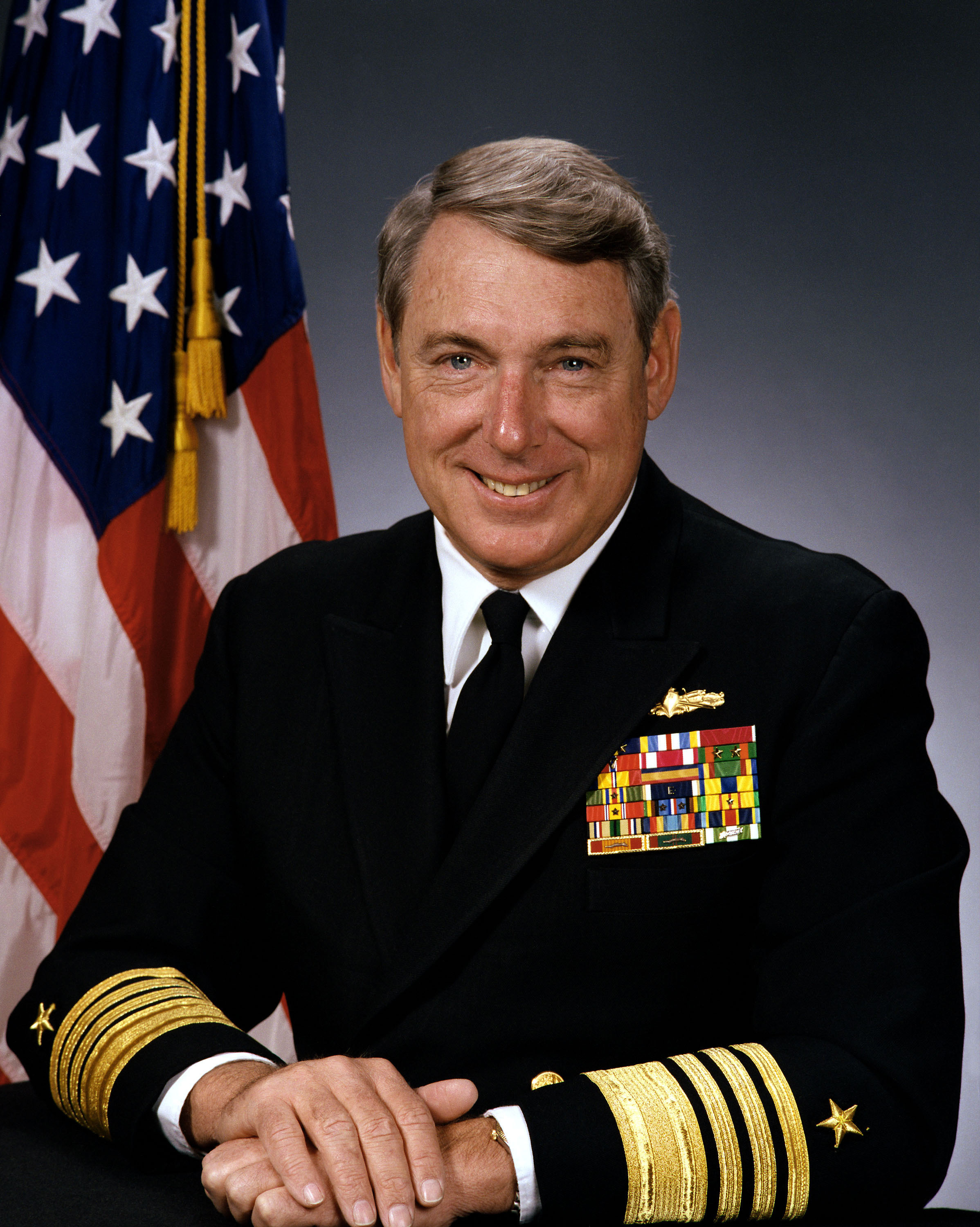
- Admiral Henry H. Mauz
- Born: May 4, 1936 (age 90); Lynchburg, Virginia, U.S.
- Military career
- Allegiance: United States
- Branch: United States Navy
- Service years: 1959–1994
- Rank: Admiral
- Nickname: "Hammerin' Hank"
- Commands: United States Atlantic Fleet; United States Seventh Fleet; Task Force 60; USS England (DLG-22); USS Semmes (DDG-18); USS Prime (MSO-466)
- Conflicts: Vietnam War; Gulf War
- Awards: Navy Distinguished Service Medal (3); Defense Superior Service Medal; Legion of Merit; Bronze Star Medal
- Other work: Board of Advisors, Genex Technologies; Board of Directors, CNF Inc. Board of Directors, Texas Industries; Advisory Council, Northrop Grumman Ship Systems

Henry Herrward Mauz Jr. (born May 4, 1936) is a retired United States Navy admiral and the former Commander in Chief, United States Atlantic Fleet from 1992 to 1994.

== Military career ==
After graduating from the United States Naval Academy in 1959, Mauz went on to serve in Vietnam, operating river patrol boats along the Mekong Delta. He went on to command a minesweeper, USS Prime (MSO-466), , the guided missile destroyer USS Semmes (DDG-18), and the guided missile cruiser USS England (CG-22) (1980–1982).

Mauz served as commander of the United States Seventh Fleet from 1988 to 1990, and in August 1990 assumed command of all United States Naval forces in the Persian Gulf.

Mauz retired from active duty in 1994 as Commander-in-Chief, United States Atlantic Fleet. A 1965 graduate of the Naval Postgraduate School, he was President of the Naval Postgraduate School Foundation, and currently serves on its board. Mauz's education includes the Naval Academy, Naval War College, a graduate degree in electrical engineering from the Naval Postgraduate School, and a Master of Business Administration from Auburn University.

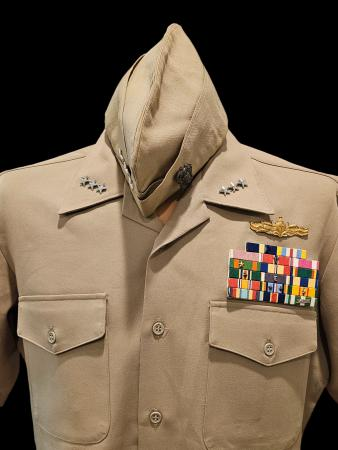
Duty shirt of Admiral Henry Mauz in the Sons of Liberty Museum Collection

== Awards and honors ==
Navy Surface Warfare Officer Pin

Navy Distinguished Service Medal with two gold award stars
Defense Superior Service Medal
Legion of Merit
Bronze Star Medal with Combat V
Meritorious Service Medal
Navy Achievement Medal with two award stars
Combat Action Ribbon
Navy and Marine Corps Presidential Unit Citation
Navy Unit Commendation
Navy Meritorious Unit Commendation with one bronze service star
Navy "E" Ribbon with one Battle E award
Navy Expeditionary Medal
National Defense Service Medal with service star
Armed Forces Expeditionary Medal with two service stars
Vietnam Service Medal with silver service star
Southwest Asia Service Medal
Navy Sea Service Deployment Ribbon
Navy & Marine Corps Overseas Service Ribbon
Order of the Rising Sun, Gold and Silver Star (Japan)
Meritorious Service Cross, Military Division (Canada)
National Order of Merit (France) (degree unknown)
Vietnam Gallantry Cross Unit Citation
Vietnam Civil Actions Medal Unit Citation
Vietnam Campaign Medal

He is a Companion of the Naval Order of the United States, and was inducted into the Naval Postgraduate School Hall of Fame on November 19, 2003.

== Retirement controversy ==
Although retired as a full admiral, Mauz's retirement was delayed by Congress due to allegations he mishandled sexual harassment complaints. Senator Patty Murray (D-WA) was chiefly responsible for the delay. In a letter to her, Mauz stated:

You have commented on the need to hold our senior officers accountable. I suggest that a U.S. senator has the same code and that in the case of your actions during my confirmation you should also be held accountable. You showed little interest in the truth.

Mauz was later confirmed by a vote of 92–6 in favor of allowing him to retire at 4-star rank.

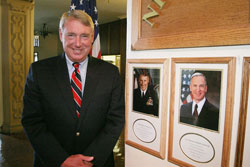
Admiral Henry H. Mauz at his induction into the Naval Postgraduate School Hall of Fame

== Post-retirement ==
Mauz is on the Board of Advisors for Genex Technologies, the Board of Directors of CNF Inc., the Board of Directors of Texas Industries, and the Advisory Council of Northrop Grumman Ship Systems, and is a Senior Fellow at the Center for Civil Military Relations at the Naval Postgraduate School.

On March 27, 2015, retired Adm. Henry H. Mauz Jr., class of 1959 was awarded the 2015 Naval Academy Alumni Association Distinguished Graduate Award.

He is also a member at Cypress Point Club.
