= Second VA-36 (U.S. Navy) =

Attack Squadron 36
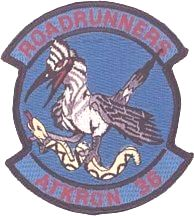
- VA-36 squadron insignia
- Active: 6 March 1987 – 1 April 1994
- Country: United States
- Branch: United States Navy
- Role: Attack
- Part of: Inactive
- Nickname(s): Roadrunners
- Engagements: Gulf War

Aircraft flown
- Attack: A-6E Intruder

Attack Squadron 36 (VA-36), nicknamed the Roadrunners, was an Attack Squadron of the United States Navy. The squadron was established on 6 March 1987 at NAS Oceana, Virginia, where it was based during its entire life. It flew the A-6E Intruder until it was disestablished on 1 April 1994. It was the second squadron to be designated VA-36, the first VA-36 was disestablished on 1 August 1970.

== Operational history ==
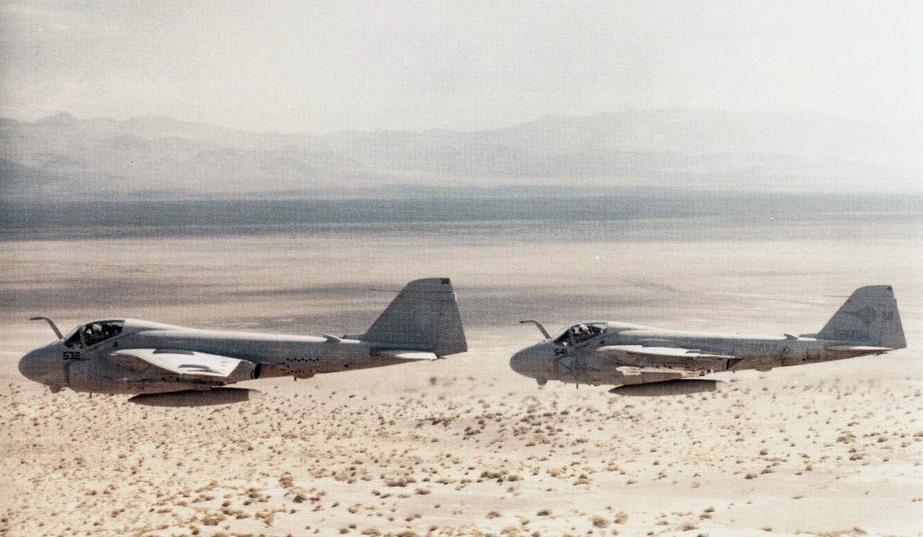
VA-36 A-6Es from USS Theodore Roosevelt during a sortie in the 1991 Gulf War

- 30 Dec 1988: VA-36 deployed aboard USS Theodore Roosevelt for the carrier's maiden cruise to the Mediterranean Sea.
- 20 Jan – 28 Feb 1991: The squadron participated in Operation Desert Storm, combat operations against Iraq.
- Apr–Jun 1991: The squadron participated in Operation Provide Comfort, a multi-national operation providing relief and aid for Kurdish refugees in northern Iraq.
- Mar–Sep 1993: The squadron, along with other units of CVW-8, deployed aboard USS Theodore Roosevelt in a new approach to joint operations to test the Navy's ability to project a wide range of power and mobility from the sea. The composition on the carrier during the deployment included the regular air wing, minus an F-14 and S-3 squadron, and a Special Marine Air-Ground Task Force consisting of a Marine Corps fixedwing and helicopter squadron and a company of Marines. The mix of units provided the carrier with the ability to project air and ground striking power ashore from a single deck.
- Jun 1993: The squadron, along with other units embarked on USS Theodore Roosevelt, operated in the Red Sea in support of a strike on the Iraqi Intelligence Service headquarters building in Baghdad in response to Iraq's attempt on the life of former President George H. W. Bush while on a visit to Kuwait in April. During this time, the squadron also participated in Operation Southern Watch missions, enforcing the U. N. no-fly zone within southern Iraq.

== See also ==
- VA-36 (U.S. Navy)
- History of the United States Navy
- List of inactive United States Navy aircraft squadrons
