= OPEVAL =

Final phase of operational testing

An Operational Evaluation (OPEVAL), the final phase of operational test and evaluation prior to fielding of a system or new equipment, is a process used by NATO military forces and designed to be no more than a 'customer acceptance' test. OPEVALs are run by the customer's agent, in the military's case one of the operational test agencies (OTAs) and uses a pre-designated operationally oriented test plan. The intent of the test is to verify that the product or proposed system meets all pre-defined operational requirements.

OPEVALs are widely associated with STANAG requirements and documentation.
