= Gulf War order of battle: United States Navy =

The United States Navy sent their naval forces in the Red Sea and Persian Gulf including six Aircraft Carriers to take part in Operation Desert Storm, including others that arrived before or after the war started and ended (as part of Operation Southern Watch).

== Units in Operation Desert Shield ==
Before Operation Desert Storm, the US Navy helped with the buildup of forces in the Middle East. Neither Independence nor Dwight D. Eisenhower took part in the actual conflict.

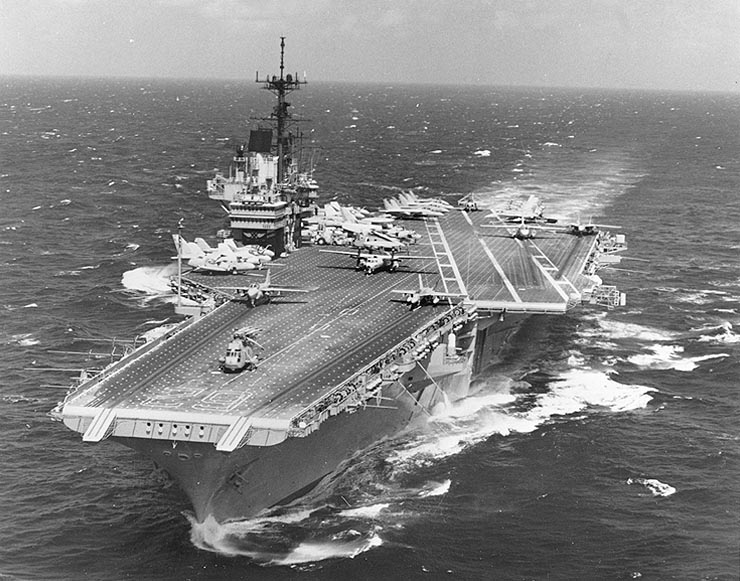
USS Independence CV-62 at sea.

=== 'Battle Group Delta'* (Relieved by USS Midway on 1 November 1990) - Persian Gulf ===
- USS Independence CV-62
- USS Jouett CG-29
- USS Antietam CG-54
- USS Goldborough DDG-20
- USS Reasoner FF-1063
- USS Brewton FF-1086
- USS Barbey FF-1088

Carrier Air Wing 14 - Tail Code: NK
Squadron	Aircraft	Notes
VF-21 Free Lancers	F-14A Tomcat	
VF-154 Black Knights	F-14A Tomcat	
VFA-25 Fist of the Fleet	F/A-18C Hornet	
VFA-113 Stingers	F/A-18C Hornet	
VA-196 Main Battery	A-6E TRAM Intruder/KA-6D Intruder	
VAQ-139 Cougars	EA-6B Prowler	
VS-37 Sawbucks	S-3A Viking	
VAW-113 Black Eagles	E-2C Hawkeye	
HS-8 Eightballers	SH-3H Sea King	

=== USS Dwight D. Eisenhower CVN-69 (8 to 24 August) - Persian Gulf ===
- USS Dwight D. Eisenhower CVN-69
- USS Ticonderoga CG-47
- USS Tattnall DDG-19
- USS Scott DDG-995
- USS Peterson DD-969
- USS John Rodgers DD-983
- USS John L. Hall FFG-32
- USS Paul FF-1080

Carrier Air Wing 7 - Tail Code: AG
Squadron	Aircraft	Notes
VF-142 Ghostriders	F-14A+ Tomcat	F-14A+ renamed F-14B in 1992.
VF-143 Pukin' Dogs	F-14A+ Tomcat	F-14A+ renamed F-14B in 1992.
VFA-136 Knight Hawks	F/A-18A Hornet	
VFA-131 Wildcats	F/A-18A Hornet	
VA-34 Blue Blasters	A-6E TRAM Intruder/KA-6D Intruder	
VAQ-140 Patriots	EA-6B Prowler	
VS-31 Topcats	S-3B Viking	
VAW-121 Bluetails	E-2C Hawkeye	
HS-5 Night Dippers	SH-3H Sea King	

== Units in Operation Desert Storm ==
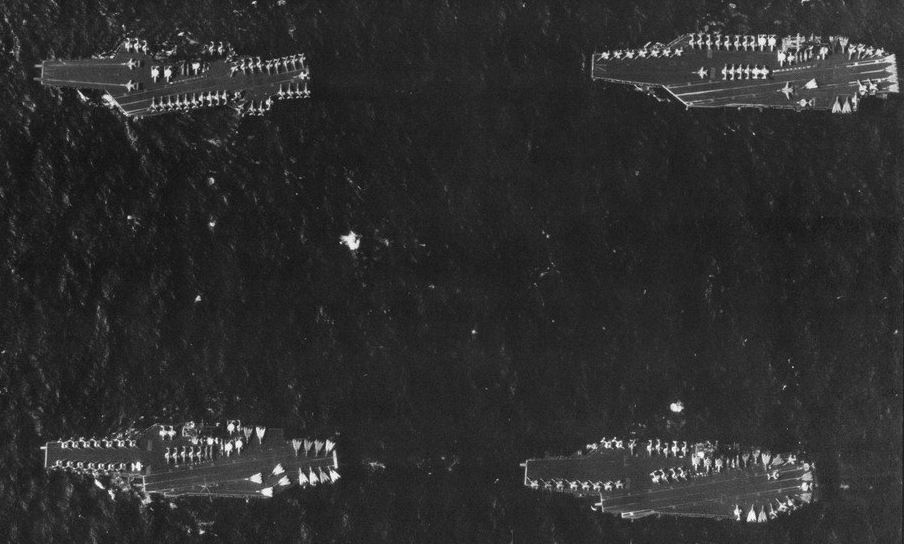
Aircraft Carriers USS Theodore Roosevelt (top right), Midway (top left), Ranger (bottom left) and America (bottom right), as part of Battle Force Zulu in the Persian Gulf. Midway was the flagship of Battle Force Zulu.

At the start of Operations Desert Storm

=== Battle Group Alfa'(2 October 1990 to 17 April 1991 - Persian Gulf)' ===
- USS Midway CV-41 (Flagship of Battle Force Zulu)
- USS Bunker Hill CG-52
- USS Mobile Bay CG-53
- USS Hewitt DD-966
- USS Oldendorf DD-972
- USS Fife DD-991
- USS Curts FFG-38

Unlike the other carriers in the Gulf War, USS Midway couldn't carry the S-3 Viking or the F-14 Tomcat due to her size constraints meaning the ship instead had three F/A-18 squadrons.

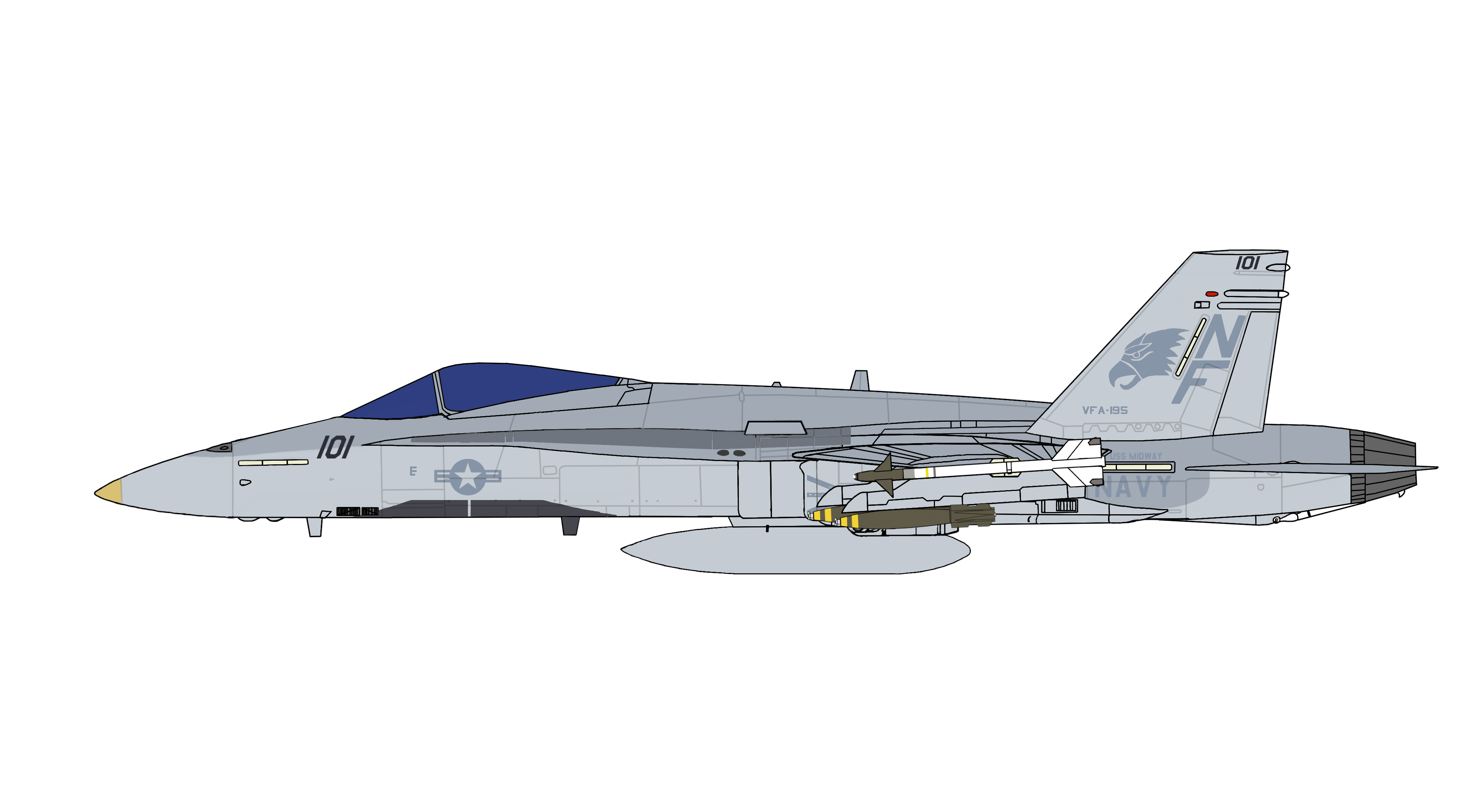
NF101 (BuNo 162887), an F/A-18A Hornet assigned to VFA-195 Dambusters aboard the USS Midway, CV-41 in the 1991 Gulf War.

Carrier Air Wing 5 - Tail Code: NF
Squadron	Aircraft	Notes
VFA-151 Vigilantes	F/A-18A Hornet	
VFA-192 Golden Dragons	F/A-18A Hornet	
VFA-195 Dambusters	F/A-18A Hornet	First F/A-18 Hornet squadron to deploy the AGM-62 Walleye II.
VA-115 Eagles	A-6E TRAM Intruder/KA-6D Intruder	
VA-185 Nighthawks	A-6E TRAM Intruder/KA-6D Intruder	VA-185 led the first naval strikes. It was decommissioned on 30 August 1991.
VAQ-136 Gauntlets	EA-6B Prowler	
VAW-115 Liberty Bells	E-2C Hawkeye	
HS-12 Wyverns	SH-3H Sea King	
USS Bunker Hill CG-52
Squadron	Aircraft	Notes
HSL-47 Saberhawks Det. A/B	SH-60B Seahawk	Detachment A from January till 10 February Detachment B for the remainder of the war.

=== Saratoga Carrier Battlegroup (7 August 1990 to 28 March 1991) - Red Sea ===
- USS Saratoga CV-60
- USS South Carolina CGN-37
- USS Biddle CG-34
- USS Philippine Sea CG-58
- USS Spruance DD-963
- USS Sampson DDG-10
- USS Elmer Montgomery FF-1082
- USS Thomas C. Hart FF-1092

Carrier Air Wing 17 - Tail Code: AA
Squadron	Aircraft	Notes
VF-74 Be-Devilers	F-14A+ Tomcat	F-14A+ renamed F-14B in 1992.
VF-103 Sluggers	F-14A+ Tomcat	F-14A+ renamed F-14B in 1992.
VFA-81 Sunliners	F/A-18C Hornet	Scored first Navy air to air kills in Gulf War (2 F-7B Fishbeds - PRC copy of MiG-21).
VFA-83 Rampagers	F/A-18C Hornet	
VA-35 Black Panthers	A-6E TRAM Intruder/KA-6D Intruder	
VAQ-132 Scorpions	EA-6B Prowler	
VS-30 Diamondcutters	S-3B Viking	
VAW-125 Tigertails/Torchbearers	E-2C Hawkeye	
HS-3 Tridents	SH-3H Sea King	

=== Battle Group Echo (8 December 1990 – 8 June 1991) - Persian Gulf ===
- USS Ranger CV-61
- USS Horne CG-30
- USS Valley Forge CG-50
- USS Princeton CG-59
- USS Paul F. Foster DD-964
- USS Harry W. Hill DD-986
- USS Jarrett FFG-33
- USS Francis Hammond FF-1067

USS Ranger had a very different air wing compared to most carriers in the Gulf War as it was in the 'Grumman Air Wing' format. This meant it didn't have the F/A-18 or A-7E Corsair, which were the 2 different light attack aircraft used on many of the carriers, replacing them with 2 A-6E intruder squadrons.

Carrier Air Wing 2 - Tail Code: NE
Squadron	Aircraft	Notes
VF-1 Wolfpack	F-14A Tomcat	Scored last Navy air to air kill (Mi-8 Helicopter)
VF-2 Bounty Hunters	F-14A Tomcat	
VA-145 Swordsmen	A-6E SWIP/TRAM Intruder	SWIP improvement was an avionics upgrade to A-6E TRAMs.
VA-155 Silver Foxes	A-6E TRAM Intruder	
VAQ-131 Lancers	EA-6B Prowler	
VS-38 Red Griffins	S-3A Viking	
VAW-116 Sun Kings	E-2C Hawkeye	
HS-14 Chargers	SH-3H Sea King	
VRC-30 Providers Detachment 61	C-2A Greyhound	
VRC-50 Foo Dogs Detachment	C-2A Greyhound	Deployed aboard USS Ranger when the carrier in the area of responsibility of the 7th Fleet.

=== USS America CV-66 (28 December 1990 – 18 April 1991) - Red Sea (Later Persian Gulf) ===
- USS America CV-66
- USS Virginia CGN-38
- USS Normandy CG-60
- USS William V. Pratt DDG-44
- USS Preble DDG-46
- USS Halyburton FFG-40

USS America crossed through the Suez Canal on 15 January 1991, the same day the UN deadline for Iraq leaving Kuwait ended.

At daylight on 19 January 1991 (2 days after the first night), CVW-1 conducted their first strikes against Iraq.

Carrier Air Wing 1 - Tail Code: AB
Squadron	Aircraft	Notes
VF-33 Starfighters	F-14A Tomcat	
VF-102 Diamondbacks	F-14A Tomcat	
VFA-82 Marauders	F/A-18C Hornet	
VFA-86 Sidewinders	F/A-18C Hornet	
VA-85 Black Falcons	A-6E TRAM Intruder/KA-6D Intruder	
VAQ-137 Rooks	EA-6B Prowler	
VS-32 Maulers	S-3B Viking	
VAW-123 Screwtops	E-2C Hawkeye	
HS-11 Dragon Slayers	SH-3H Sea King	

=== USS John F. Kennedy CV-67 (15 August 1990 – 28 March 1991) - Red Sea ===
- USS John F. Kennedy CV-67
- USS Mississippi CGN-40
- USS Thomas S. Gates CG-51
- USS San Jacinto CG-56
- USS Moosbrugger DD-980
- USS Samuel B. Roberts FFG-58

Carrier Air Wing 3 - Tail Code: AC
Squadron	Aircraft	Notes
VF-14 Tophatters	F-14A Tomcat	
VF-32 Swordsmen	F-14A Tomcat	
VA-46 Clansmen	A-7E Corsair	Last war for the A-7 Corsair.
VA-72 Blue Hawks	A-7E Corsair	Last war for the A-7 Corsair.
VA-75 Sunday Punchers	A-6E SWIP/TRAM Intruder/KA-6D Intruder	SWIP improvement was an avionics upgrade to A-6E TRAMs.
VAQ-130 Zappers	EA-6B Prowler	
VS-22 Checkmates	S-3B Viking	
VAW-126 Seahawks	E-2C Hawkeye	
HS-7 Dusty Dogs	SH-3H Sea King	

=== USS Theodore Roosevelt CVN-71 (28 December 1990 – 28 June 1991) - Persian Gulf (Later Red Sea) ===
- USS Theodore Roosevelt CVN-71
- USS Richmond K. Turner CG-20
- USS Leyte Gulf CG-55
- USS Caron DD-970
- USS Hawes FFG-53
- USS Vreeland FF-1068

USS Theodore Roosevelt launched her first strikes two days after the first night on the morning of 19 January 1991. After the Gulf War, Theodore Roosevelt took part in Operation Provide Comfort after transiting the Suez Canal on 20 April 1991.

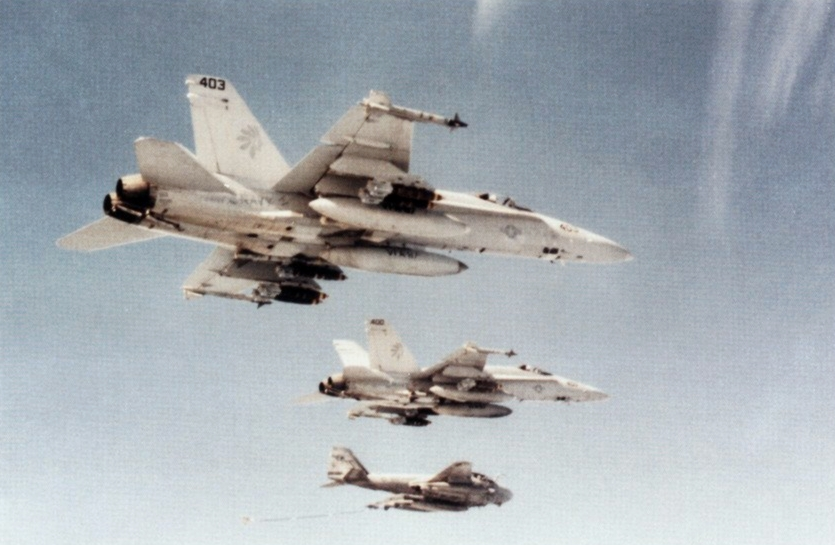
Two F/A-18As from VFA-87 about to refuel from an A-6E from VA-36 during Desert Storm in 1991.

Carrier Air Wing 8 - Tail Code: AJ
Squadron	Aircraft	Notes
VF-41 Black Aces	F-14A Tomcat	
VF-84 Jolly Rogers	F-14A Tomcat	
VFA-15 Valions	F/A-18A Hornet	
VFA-87 Golden Warriors	F/A-18A Hornet	
VA-36 Roadrunners	A-6E TRAM Intruder	
VA-65 Tigers	A-6E TRAM Intruder	This was VA-65's last deployment before retirement in 1993.
VAQ-141 Shadowhawks	EA-6B Prowler	
VS-24 Scouts	S-3B Viking	
VAW-124 Bear Aces	E-2C Hawkeye	
HS-9 Sea Griffins	SH-3H Sea King	
VRC-40 Rawhides Detachment D	C-2A Greyhounds	

== Units in Operation Southern Watch (1991-2003) ==
=== 1991 ===
Battle Group Bravo (25 February 1991 – 24 August 1991)

- USS Nimitz CVN-68
- USS Texas CGN-39
- USS Chancellorsville CG-62
- USS Rentz FFG-46
- USS Stein FF-1065
- USS Harold E. Holt FF-1074
- USS Camden AOE-2

Carrier Air Wing 9 - Tail Code: NG
Squadron	Aircraft	Notes
VF-24 Fighting Renegades	F-14A+ Tomcat	
VF-211 Checkmates	F-14A+ Tomcat	F-14A+ renamed F-14B in 1992.
VFA-146 Blue Diamonds	F/A-18C (N) Hornet	Night Attack Hornet
VFA-147 Argonauts	F/A-18C (N) Hornet	Night Attack Hornet
VA-165 Boomers	A-6E SWIP Intruder/KA-6D Intruder	
VAQ-138 Yellow Jackets	EA-6B Prowler	
VS-33 Screwbirds	S-3A Viking	
VAW-112 Golden Hawks	E-2C Hawkeye	
HS-2 Golden Falcons	SH-60F/HH-60H Oceanhawk	

Battle Group Foxtrot (26 May 1991 – 25 November 1991)

- USS Abraham Lincoln CVN-72
- USS Long Beach CGN-9
- USS Lake Champlain CG-57
- USS Merrill DD-976
- USS Gary FFG-51
- USS Ingraham FFG-61

This was the maiden voyage for USS Abraham Lincoln.

Carrier Air Wing 11 - Tail Code: NH
Squadron	Aircraft	Notes
VF-114 Aardvarks	F-14A Tomcat	Disestablished 30 April 1993
VF-213 Black Lions	F-14A Tomcat	
VFA-22 Fighting Redcocks	F/A-18C (N) Hornet	Night Attack Hornet
VFA-94 Mighty Shrikes	F/A-18C (N) Hornet	Night Attack Hornet
VA-95 Green Lizards	A-6E SWIP Intruder/KA-6D Intruder	
VAQ-135 Black Ravens	EA-6B Prowler	
VS-29 Dragonflies	S-3B Viking	
VAW-117 Wallbangers	E-2C Hawkeye	
HS-6 Indians	SH-60F/HH-60H Oceanhawk	

Battle Force Zulu (26 September 1991 – 2 April 1992)

- USS Dwight D. Eisenhower CVN-69
- USS Bainbridge CGN-25
- USS Ticonderoga CG-47
- USS Mahan DDG-42
- USS Arthur W. Radford DD-968
- USS Elrod FFG-55

Carrier Air Wing 7 - Tail Code: AG
Squadron	Aircraft	Notes
VF-142 Ghostriders	F-14A+ Tomcat	F-14A+ renamed F-14B in 1992.
VF-143 Pukin' Dogs	F-14A+ Tomcat	F-14A+ renamed F-14B in 1992.
VFA-136 Knight Hawks	F/A-18A Hornet	
VFA-131 Wildcats	F/A-18A Hornet	
VA-34 Blue Blasters	A-6E TRAM Intruder/KA-6D Intruder	
VAQ-140 Patriots	EA-6B Prowler	
VS-31 Topcats	S-3B Viking	
VAW-121 Bluetails	E-2C Hawkeye	
HS-5 Night Dippers	SH-3H Sea King	

America Carrier Battle Group (2 December 1991 – 6 June 1992)

- USS America CV-66
- USS Normandy CG-60
- USS Monterey CG-61
- USS Scott DDG-995
- USS John Hancock DD-981
- USS Thorn DD-988
- USS Boone FFG-28
- USS Simpson FFG-56

Carrier Air Wing 1 - Tail Code: AB
Squadron	Aircraft	Notes
VF-33 Starfighters	F-14A Tomcat	
VF-102 Diamondbacks	F-14A Tomcat	
VFA-82 Marauders	F/A-18C Hornet	
VFA-86 Sidewinders	F/A-18C Hornet	
VA-85 Black Falcons	A-6E TRAM Intruder/KA-6D Intruder	
VAQ-137 Rooks	EA-6B Prowler	
VS-32 Maulers	S-3B Viking	
VAW-123 Screwtops	E-2C Hawkeye	
HS-11 Dragon Slayers	SH-3H Sea King	

=== 1992 ===
Independence Carrier Battle Group (15 April 1992 – 13 October 1992)

- USS Independence CV-62
- USS Gridley CG-21
- USS Bunker Hill CG-52
- USS Mobile Bay CG-53
- USS Fife DD-991
- USS Thach FFG-43
- USS Vandegrift FFG-48

USS Independence replaced USS Midway as the forward deployed carrier of the United States 7th Fleet.

Carrier Air Wing 5 - Tail Code: NF
Squadron	Aircraft	Notes
VF-21 Free Lancers	F-14A Tomcat	
VF-154 Black Knights	F-14A Tomcat	
VFA-192 Golden Dragons	F/A-18C Hornet	
VFA-195 Dambusters	F/A-18C Hornet	
VA-115 Eagles	A-6E SWIP/TRAM Intruder	
VAQ-136 Gauntlets	EA-6B Prowler	
VS-21 Redtails	S-3B Viking	
VAW-115 Liberty Bells	E-2C Hawkeye	
HS-12 Wyverns	SH-3H Sea King	

Ranger Carrier Battle Group (1 August 1992 – 31 January 1993)

- USS Ranger CV-61
- USS Valley Forge CG-50
- USS Chosin CG-65
- USS Kinkaid DD-965
- USS Kirk FF-1087

This was the last cruise for USS Ranger.

Carrier Air Wing 2 - Tail Code: NE
Squadron	Aircraft	Notes
VF-1 Wolfpack	F-14A Tomcat	Disestablished 1 Oct 1993
VF-2 Bounty Hunters	F-14A Tomcat	
VA-145 Swordsmen	A-6E SWIP Intruder	SWIP improvement was an avionics upgrade to A-6E TRAMs. Disestablished 1 Oct 1993
VA-155 Silver Foxes	A-6E SWIP Intruder	Disestablished 30 April 1993
VAQ-131 Lancers	EA-6B Prowler	
VS-38 Red Griffins	S-3A Viking	
VAW-116 Sun Kings	E-2C Hawkeye	
HS-14 Chargers	SH-3H Sea King	

Kitty Hawk Carrier Battle Group (3 November 1992 – 3 May 1993)

- USS Kitty Hawk CV-63
- USS Leahy CG 16
- USS Worden CG-18
- USS William H. Standley CG-32
- USS Cowpens CG-63
- USS Hewitt DD-966
- USS Stump DD-978
- USS Jarrett FFG-33
- USS Samuel B. Roberts FFG-58
- USS Houston SSN-713
- USS Louisville SSN-724
- USS Sacramento AOE-1

The Kitty Hawk Battle Group participated in a airstrike on Jan 13 to Jan 22 in 1993.

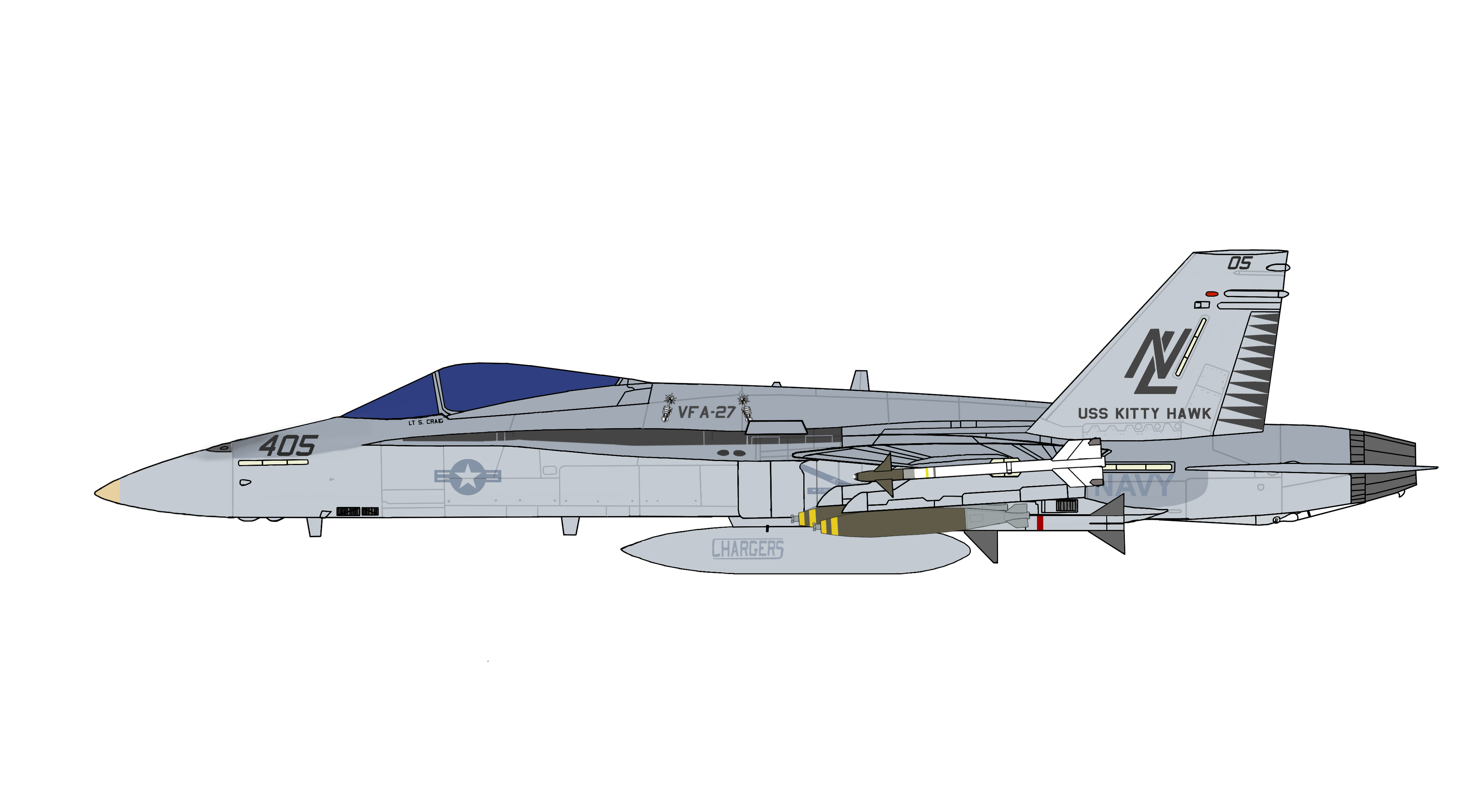
BuNo 162883 as NL-405, one of the aircraft of VFA-27 that took part in the 13 January 1993 air strike against air defence targets in Southern Iraq.

Carrier Air Wing 15 - Tail Code: NL
Squadron	Aircraft	Notes
VF-51 Screaming Eagles	F-14A Tomcat	
VF-111 Sundowners	F-14A Tomcat	
VFA-27 Chargers	F/A-18A Hornet	
VFA-97 Warhawks	F/A-18A Hornet	Led airstrike on Jan 13, 1993
VA-52 Knightriders	A-6E SWIP Intruder / KA-6D Intruder	
VAQ-134 Garudas	EA-6B Prowler	
VS-37 Sawbucks	S-3B Viking	
VAW-114 Hormel Hogs	E-2C Hawkeye	
HS-4 Black Knights	SH-60F/HH-60H Oceanhawk	

=== 1993 ===
Nimitz Carrier Battle Group (2 February 1993 – 1 August 1993)

- USS Nimitz CVN-68
- USS Lake Champlain CG-57
- USS Chancellorsville CG-62
- USS Truxtun CGN-35
- USS Reeves CG-24
- USS Leftwich DD-984
- USS Birmingham SSN-695
- USS Kansas City AOR-3

Carrier Air Wing 9 - Tail Code: NG
Squadron	Aircraft	Notes
VF-24 Fighting Renegades	F-14A Tomcat	
VF-211 Checkmates	F-14A Tomcat	
VFA-146 Blue Diamonds	F/A-18C (N) Hornet	Night Attack Hornet
VFA-147 Argonauts	F/A-18C (N) Hornet	Night Attack Hornet
VA-165 Boomers	A-6E SWIP Intruder/KA-6D Intruder	
VAQ-138 Yellow Jackets	EA-6B Prowler	
VS-33 Screwbirds	S-3B Viking	
VAW-112 Golden Hawks	E-2C Hawkeye	
HS-2 Golden Falcons	SH-60F/HH-60H Oceanhawk	

Theodore Roosevelt Carrier Battle Group (11 March 1993 – 8 September 1993)

- USS Theodore Roosevelt CVN-71
- USS Arliegh Burke DDG-51
- USS Spruance DD-963

Carrier Air Wing 8 - Tail Code: AJ
Squadron	Aircraft	Notes
VF-84 Jolly Rogers	F-14A Tomcat	Disestablished on 1 Oct 1995
VFA-15 Valions	F/A-18C (N) Hornet	Night Attack Hornet
VFA-87 Golden Warriors	F/A-18C (N) Hornet	Night Attack Hornet
VMFA-312 Checkboards	F/A-18C (N) Hornet	Night Attack Hornet. Marine Corps Squadron
VA-36 Roadrunners	A-6E TRAM Intruder	Disestablished on 1 April 1994
VAQ-141 Shadowhawks	EA-6B Prowler	
VAW-124 Bear Aces	E-2C Hawkeye	
HS-3 Tridents	SH-60F/HH-60H Oceanhawk	
HMH-362 Ugly Angels	CH-53D Sea Stallion UH-1N Twin Huey (HMLA-167)	
VRC-40 Rawhides Detachment 2	C-2A Greyhound	

Abraham Lincoln Carrier Battle Group (15 June 1993 – 15 December 1993)

- USS Abraham Lincoln CVN-72
- USS Fox CG-33
- USS Princeton CG-59
- USS Chandler DDG-996
- USS Ingraham FFG-61

Carrier Air Wing 11 - Tail Code: NH
Squadron	Aircraft	Notes
VF-213 Black Lions	F-14A Tomcat	
VFA-22 Fighting Redcocks	F/A-18C (N) Hornet	Night Attack Hornet
VFA-94 Mighty Shrikes	F/A-18C (N) Hornet	Night Attack Hornet
VMFA-314 Black Knights	F/A-18A Hornet	Marine Corps Squadron
VA-95 Green Lizards	A-6E SWIP Intruder	
VAQ-135 Black Ravens	EA-6B Prowler	
VS-29 Dragonflies	S-3B Viking	
VAW-117 Wallbangers	E-2C Hawkeye	
HS-6 Indians	SH-60F/HH-60H Oceanhawk	

Independence Carrier Battle Group (17 November 1993 – 17 March 1994)

- USS Independence CV-62
- USS Bunker Hill CG-52
- USS Mobile Bay CG-53
- USS Curts FFG-38
- USS McClusky FFG-41

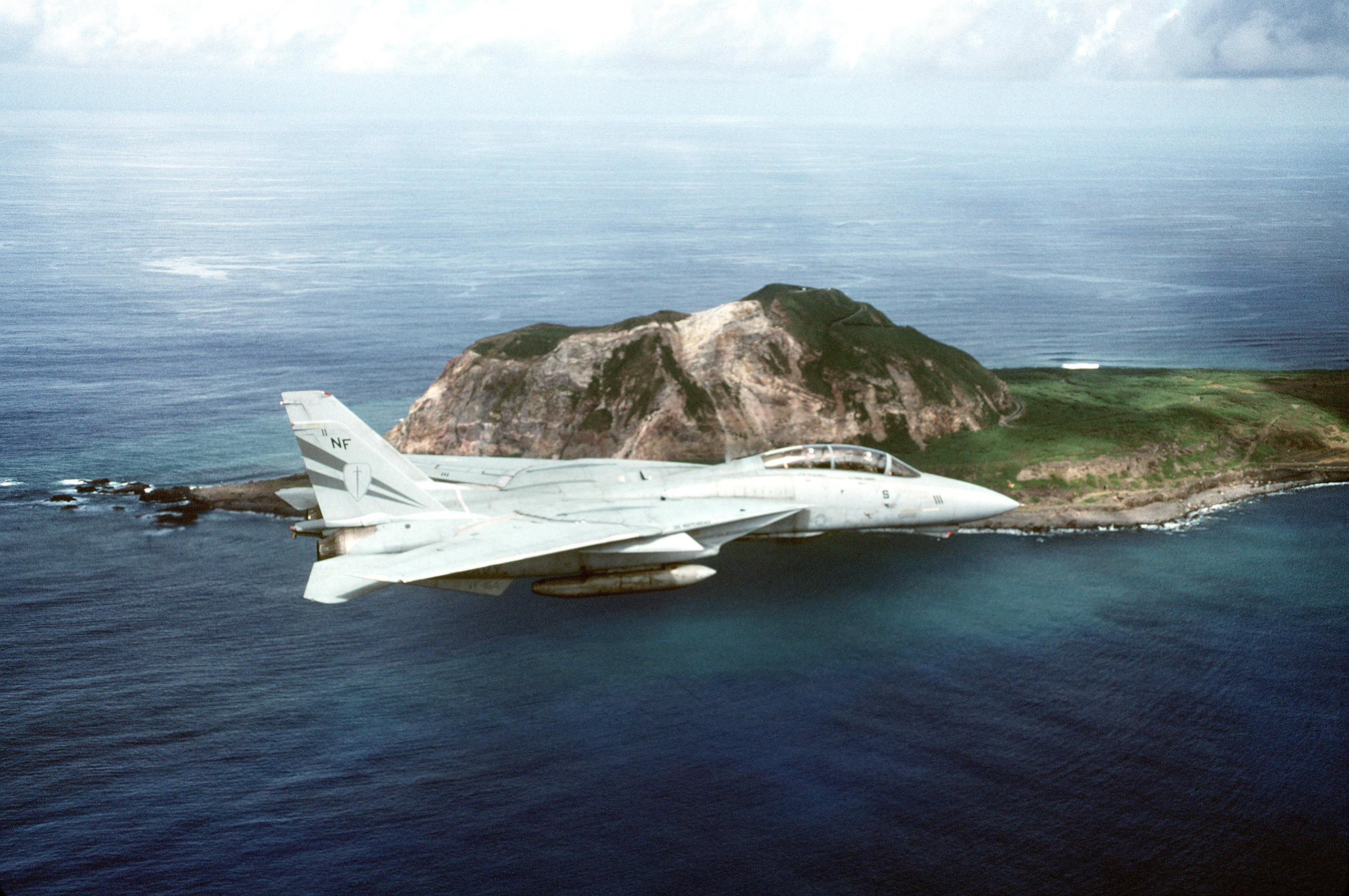
F-14A of VF-154 while attached to CVW-5 in 1994. This aircraft is flying over Mount Suribachi in Japan.

Carrier Air Wing 5 - Tail Code: NF
Squadron	Aircraft	Notes
VF-21 Free Lancers	F-14A Tomcat	
VF-154 Black Knights	F-14A Tomcat	
VFA-192 Golden Dragons	F/A-18C Hornet	
VFA-195 Dambusters	F/A-18C Hornet	
VA-115 Eagles	A-6E SWIP Intruder	
VAQ-136 Gauntlets	EA-6B Prowler	
VS-21 Redtails	S-3B Viking	
VAW-115 Liberty Bells	E-2C Hawkeye	
HS-12 Wyverns	SH-3H Sea King	Disestablished 30 Nov 1994
VQ-5 Sea Shadows Det.A	ES-3A Shadow	

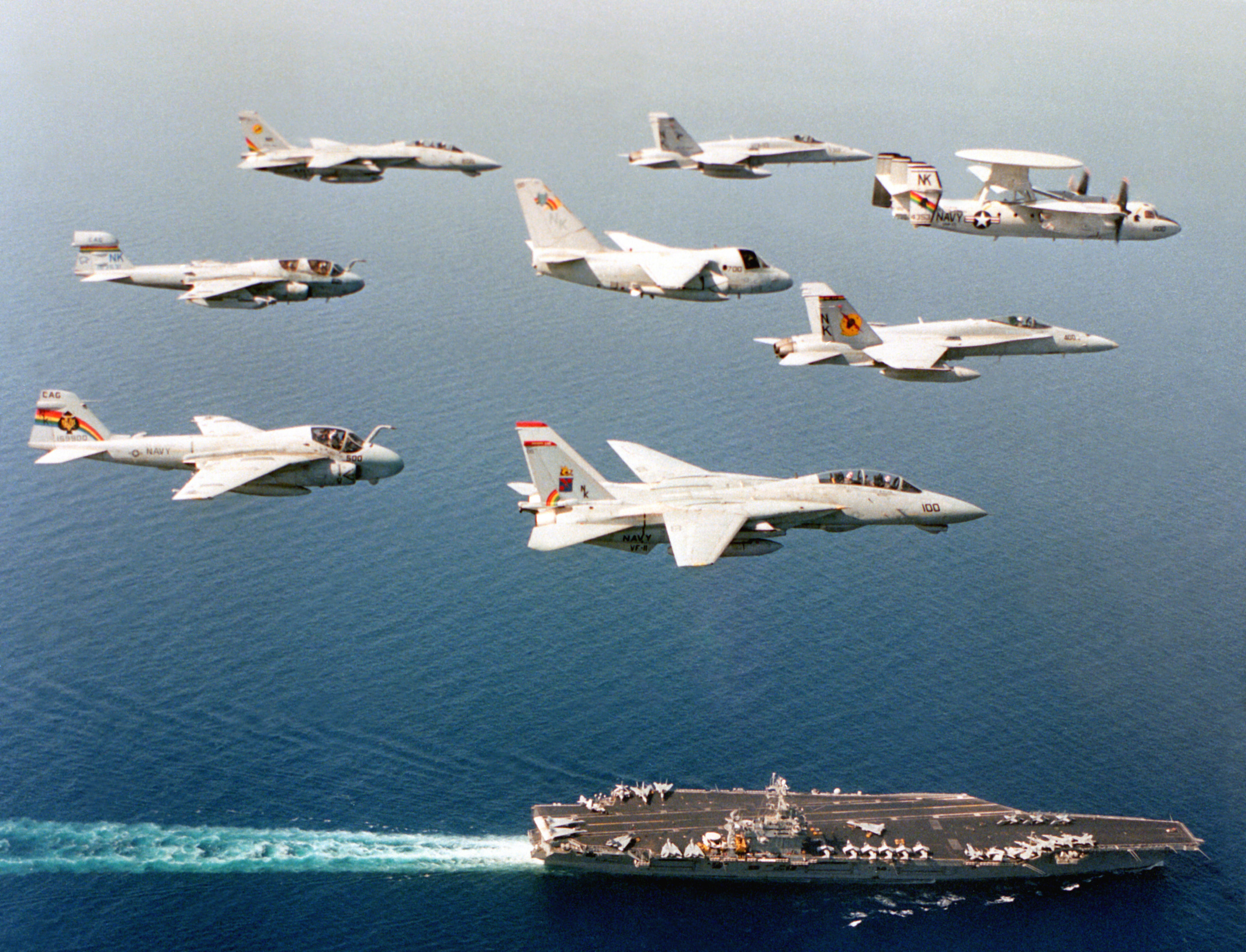
Aircraft from CVW-14 flying over the USS Carl Vinson CVN-70 on 1 May 1994.

=== 1994 ===
Carl Vinson Carrier Battlegroup (17 February 1994 – 17 August 1994)

- USS Carl Vinson CVN-70
- USS Arkansas CGN-41
- USS Antietam CG-54
- USS Paul F. Foster DD-964
- USS Reuben James FFG-57
- USS Asheville SSN-758

Carrier Air Wing 14 - Tail Code: NK
Squadron	Aircraft	Notes	
VF-11 Red Rippers	F-14D Super Tomcat	First deployment of F-14D	Cruise filmed for Carrier: Fortress at Sea.
VF-31 Tomcatters	F-14D Super Tomcat	First deployment of F-14D	Cruise filmed for Carrier: Fortress at Sea.
VFA-25 Fist of the Fleet	F/A-18C (N) Hornet	Night Attack Hornet	Cruise filmed for Carrier: Fortress at Sea.
VFA-113 Stingers	F/A-18C (N) Hornet	Night Attack Hornet	Cruise filmed for Carrier: Fortress at Sea.
VA-196 Main Battery	A-6E SWIP Intruder		Cruise filmed for Carrier: Fortress at Sea.
VAQ-139 Cougars	EA-6B Prowler		Cruise filmed for Carrier: Fortress at Sea.
VS-35 Blue Wolves	S-3B Viking		Cruise filmed for Carrier: Fortress at Sea.
VAW-113 Black Eagles	E-2C Hawkeye		Cruise filmed for Carrier: Fortress at Sea.
HS-8 Eightballers	SH-60F/HH-60H Oceanhawk		Cruise filmed for Carrier: Fortress at Sea.

George Washington Carrier Battle Group (20 May 1994 – 17 November 1994)

- USS George Washington CVN-73
- USS Leyte Gulf CG-55
- USS San Jacinto CG-56
- USS Barry DDG-52
- USS Hewitt DD-966
- USS Reid FFG-30
- USS John L. Hall FFG-32
- USS Rodney M. Davis FFG-60

Maiden voyage for the USS George Washington, also participated in Operation Vigilant Warrior.

Carrier Air Wing 7 - Tail Code: AG
Squadron	Aircraft	Notes
VF-142 Ghostriders	F-14B Tomcat	
VF-143 Pukin Dogs	F-14B Tomcat	
VFA-131 Wildcats	F/A-18C Hornet	
VFA-136 Knighthawks	F/A-18C Hornet	
VA-34 Blue Blasters	A-6E SWIP Intruder	
VAQ-140 Patriots	EA-6B Prowler	
VS-31 Topcats	S-3B Viking	
VAW-121 Bluetails	E-2C Hawkeye	
HS-5 Nightdippers	SH-3H Sea King	
VQ-6 Black Ravens Det.B	ES-3A Shadow	

Dwight D Eisenhower Carrier Battle Group (20 October 1994 – 14 April 1995)

- USS Dwight D Eisenhower CVN-69
- USS Gettysburg CG-64
- USS Anzio CG-68
- USS Halyburton FFG-40

Carrier Air Wing 3 - Tail Code: AC
Squadron	Aircraft	Notes
VF-32 Swordsmen	F-14A Tomcat	
VFA-37 Bulls	F/A-18C (N) Hornet	Night Attack Hornet
VFA-105 Gunslingers	F/A-18C (N) Hornet	Night Attack Hornet
VAQ-130 Zappers	EA-6B Prowler	
VS-22 Checkmates	S-3B Viking	
VAW-126 Seahawks	E-2C Hawkeye	
HS-7 Dusty Dogs	SH-3H Sea King	
VQ-6 Black Ravens Det.C	ES-3A Shadow	

Constellation Carrier Battle Group (10 November 1994 – 10 May 1995)

- USS Constellation CV-64
- USS Chosin CG-65
- USS Lake Erie CG-70
- USS Kinkaid DD-965

Carrier Air Wing 2 - Tail Code: NE
Squadron	Aircraft	Notes
VF-2 Bounty Hunters	F-14D Super Tomcat	
VFA-151 Viginlantes	F/A-18C (N) Hornet	Night Attack Hornet
VFA-137 Kestrels	F/A-18C (N) Hornet	Night Attack Hornet
VMFA-323 Death Rattlers	F/A-18C (N) Hornet	Marine Corps Squadron
VAQ-131 Lancers	EA-6B Prowler	
VS-38 Red Griffins	S-3B Viking	
VAW-116 Sun Kings	E-2C Hawkeye	
HS-2 Golden Falcons	SH-60F/HH-60H Oceanhawk	
VQ-5 Sea Shadows Det.D	ES-3A Shadow	

=== 1995 ===
Theodore Roosevelt Carrier Battle Group (22 March 1995 – 22 September 1995)

- USS Theodore Roosevelt CVN-71
- USS Hué City CG-66
- USS Key West SSN-722

Carrier Air Wing 8 - Tail Code: AJ
Squadron	Aircraft	Notes
VF-41 Black Aces	F-14A Tomcat	
VFA-15 Valions	F/A-18C (N) Hornet	Night Attack Hornet
VFA-87 Golden Warriors	F/A-18C (N) Hornet	Night Attack Hornet
VMFA-312 Checkboards	F/A-18C (N) Hornet	Night Attack Hornet. Marine Corps Squadron
VAQ-141 Shadowhawks	EA-6B Prowler	
VAQ-209 Star Warriors Detachment	EA-6B Prowler	2 Plane Detachment
VAW-124 Bear Aces	E-2C Hawkeye	
HS-3 Tridents	SH-60F/HH-60H Oceanhawk	
VS-24 Scouts	S-3B Viking	
VQ-6 Black Raven Det.D	ES-3A Shadow	
VRC-40 Rawhides Detachment 3	C-2A Greyhound	

Abraham Lincoln Carrier Battle Group (11 April 1995 – 9 October 1995)

- USS Abraham Lincoln CVN-72
- USS Princeton CG-59
- USS John Paul Jones DDG-53
- USS Merrill DD-976

Carrier Air Wing 11 - Tail Code: NH
Squadron	Aircraft	Notes
VF-213 Black Lions	F-14A Tomcat	
VFA-22 Fighting Redcocks	F/A-18C (N) Hornet	Night Attack Hornet
VFA-94 Mighty Shrikes	F/A-18C (N) Hornet	Night Attack Hornet
VA-95 Green Lizards	A-6E SWIP Intruder	Disestablished 18 Nov 1995
VAQ-135 Black Ravens	EA-6B Prowler	
VS-29 Dragonflies	S-3B Viking	
VAW-117 Wallbangers	E-2C Hawkeye	
HS-6 Indians	SH-60F/HH-60H Oceanhawk	
VQ-5 Sea Shadows Det.C	ES-3A Shadow	

Independence Carrier Battle Group (19 August 1995 – 18 November 1995)

- USS Independence CV-62
- USS Bunker Hill CG-52
- USS Mobile Bay CG-53
- USS Fife DD-991
- USS Curts FFG-38

Carrier Air Wing 5 - Tail Code: NF
Squadron	Aircraft	Notes
VF-21 Free Lancers	F-14A Tomcat	Disestablished 31 Jan 1996
VF-154 Black Knights	F-14A Tomcat	
VFA-192 Golden Dragons	F/A-18C Hornet	
VFA-195 Dambusters	F/A-18C Hornet	
VA-115 Eagles	A-6E SWIP Intruder	Renamed VFA-115 1 Oct 1996 Transitioned to F/A-18C
VAQ-136 Gauntlets	EA-6B Prowler	
VS-21 Redtails	S-3B Viking	
VAW-115 Liberty Bells	E-2C Hawkeye	
HS-14 Chargers	SH-60F/HH-60H Oceanhawk	
VQ-5 Sea Shadows Det.A	ES-3A Shadow	

America Carrier Battle Group (28 August 1995 – 24 February 1996)

- USS America CV-66
- USS Monterey CG-61

This was the last cruise for USS America.

Carrier Air Wing 1 - Tail Code: AB
Squadron	Aircraft	Notes
VF-102 Diamondbacks	F-14B Tomcat	
VFA-82 Marauders	F/A-18C Hornet	
VFA-86 Sidewinders	F/A-18C Hornet	
VMFA-251 Thunderbolts	F/A-18C Hornet	Marine Corps Squadron
VMAQ-3 Moon Dogs	EA-6B Prowler	Marine Corps Squadron
VS-32 Maulers	S-3B Viking	
VAW-123 Screwtops	E-2C Hawkeye	
HS-11 Dragon Slayers	SH-60F/HH-60H Oceanhawk	
VQ-6 Black Raven Det.A	ES-3A Shadow	
VRC-40 Rawhides Detachment 4	C-2A Greyhound	

Nimitz Carrier Battle Group (27 November 1995 – 20 May 1996)

- USS Nimitz CVN-68
- USS Port Royal CG-73
- USS Callaghan DDG-994
- USS Oldendorf DD-972
- USS Ford FFG-54

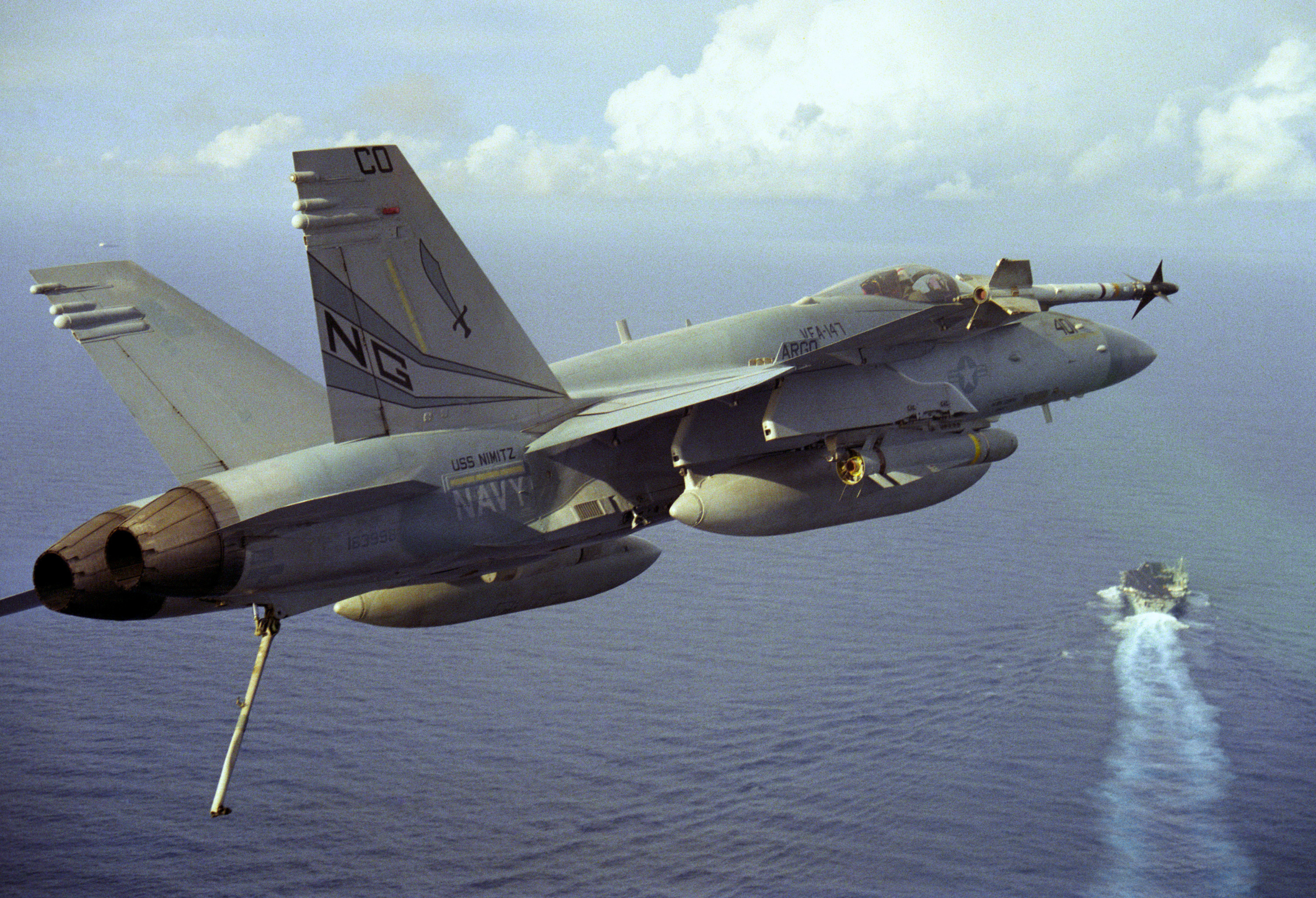
An F/A-18C Night Attack Hornet from VFA-147 Argonauts approaching the USS Nimitz CVN-68 in 1996.

Carrier Air Wing 9 - Tail Code: NG
Squadron	Aircraft	Notes
VF-24 Fighting Renegades	F-14A Tomcat	Disestablished 31 Aug 1996
VF-211 Checkmates	F-14A Tomcat	
VFA-146 Blue Diamonds	F/A-18C (N) Hornet	Night Attack Hornet
VFA-147 Argonauts	F/A-18C (N) Hornet	Night Attack Hornet
VA-165 Boomers	A-6E SWIP Intruder	Disestablished 30 Sep 1996
VAQ-138 Yellow Jackets	EA-6B Prowler	
VS-33 Screwbirds	S-3B Viking	
VAW-112 Golden Hawks	E-2C Hawkeye	
HS-2 Golden Falcons	SH-60F/HH-60H Oceanhawk	
VQ-5 Sea Shadows Det.C	ES-3A Shadow	

=== 1996 ===
George Washington Carrier Battle Group (26 January 1996 – 23 July 1996)

- USS George Washington CVN-73
- USS San Jacinto CG-56

Carrier Air Wing 7 - Tail Code: AG
Squadron	Aircraft	Notes
VF-143 Dogs	F-14B Tomcat	
VFA-131 Wildcats	F/A-18C Hornet	
VFA-136 Knighthawks	F/A-18C Hornet	
VA-34 Blue Blasters	A-6E SWIP Intruder	
VAQ-140 Patriots	EA-6B Prowler	
VS-31 Topcats	S-3B Viking	
VAW-121 Bluetails	E-2C Hawkeye	
HS-5 Nightdippers	SH-60F/HH-60H Oceanhawk	
VQ-6 Black Ravens Det.B	ES-3A Shadow	

Kitty Hawk Carrier Battle Group (11 April 1996 – 9 October 1996)

- USS Kitty Hawk CV-63
- USS Antietam CG-54
- USS Cowpens CG-63
- USS Cushing DD-985
- USS Reid FFG-30

Carrier Air Wing 11 - Tail Code: NH
Squadron	Aircraft	Notes
VF-213 Black Lions	F-14A Tomcat	
VFA-22 Fighting Redcocks	F/A-18C (N) Hornet	Night Attack Hornet
VFA-94 Mighty Shrikes	F/A-18C (N) Hornet	
VFA-97 Warhawks	F/A-18C (N) Hornet	
VAQ-135 Black Ravens	EA-6B Prowler	
VS-29 Dragonflies	S-3B Viking	
VAW-117 Wallbangers	E-2C Hawkeye	
HS-6 Indians	SH-60F/HH-60H Oceanhawk	
VQ-5 Sea Shadows Det.B	ES-3A Shadow	

Carl Vinson Carrier Battle Group (14 May 1996 – 14 November 1996)

- USS Cark Vinson CVN-70
- USS California CGN-36
- USS Arkansas CGN-41
- USS Shiloh CG-67
- USS Laboon DDG-58
- USS Russell DDG-59
- USS Hewitt DD-966
- USS Crommelin FFG-37
- USS Jefferson City SSN-759

Carl Vinson Battle Group participated in Operation Desert Strike

Carrier Air Wing 14 - Tail Code: NK
Squadron	Aircraft	Notes
VF-11 Red Rippers	F-14D Super Tomcat	
VF-31 Tomcatters	F-14D Super Tomcat	
VFA-25 Fist of the Fleet	F/A-18C (N) Hornet	Night Attack Hornet
VFA-113 Stingers	F/A-18C (N) Hornet	Night Attack Hornet
VA-196 Main Battery	A-6E SWIP Intruder	Disestablished 28 Feb 1997 Last Pacific Fleet A-6 Intruder Squadron
VAQ-139 Cougars	EA-6B Prowler	
VS-35 Blue Wolves	S-3B Viking	
VAW-113 Black Eagles	E-2C Hawkeye	
HS-4 Black Knights	SH-60F/HH-60H Oceanhawk	
VQ-5 Sea Shadows Det.D	ES-3A Shadow	

Enterprise Carrier Battle Group (28 June 1996 – 20 December 1996)

- USS Enterprise CVN-65
- USS Gettysburg CG-64

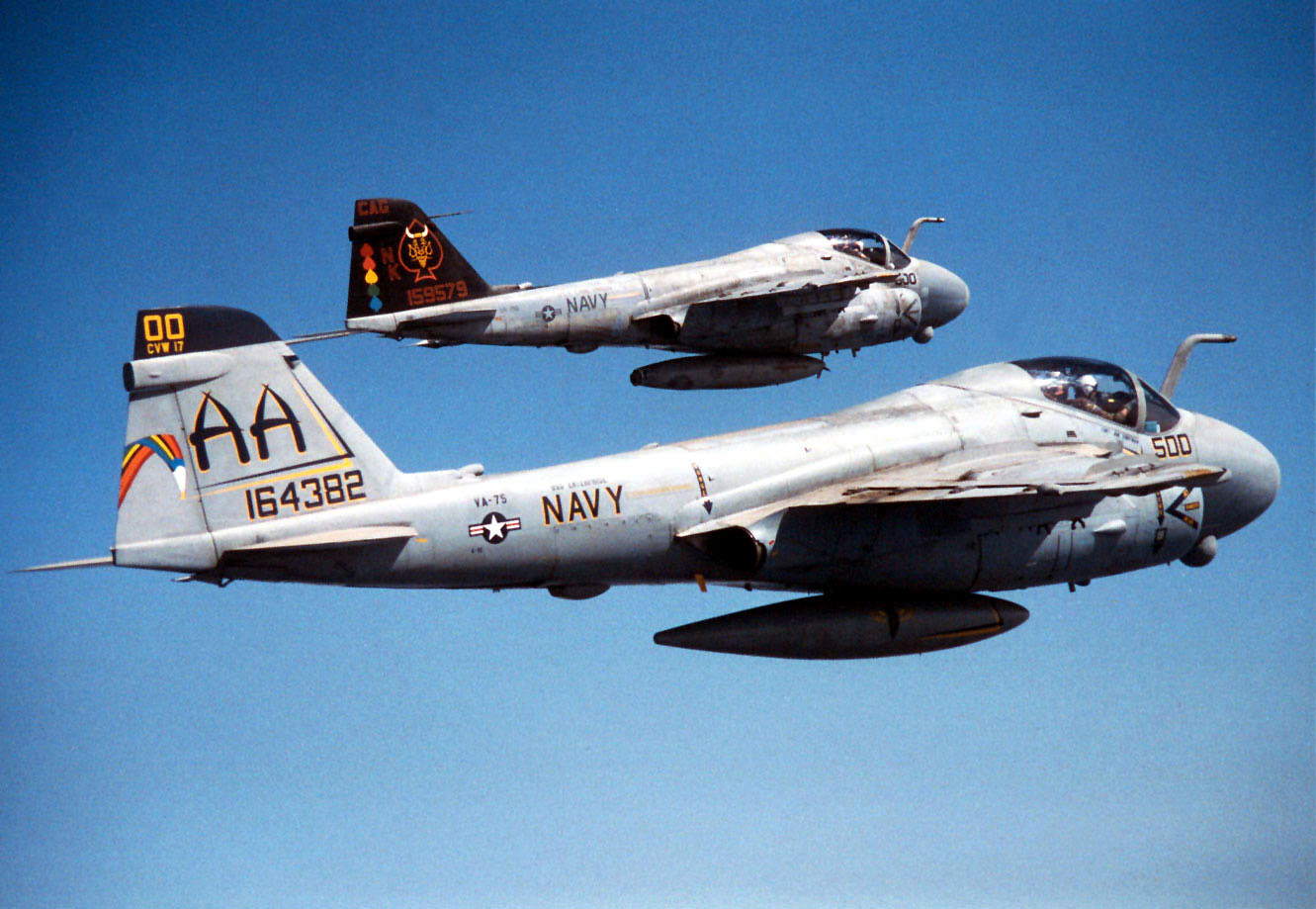
Two A-6E SWIP Intruders painted as CAG Birds for VA-75 and VA-196 in 1996.

Carrier Air Wing 17 - Tail Code: AA
Squadron	Aircraft	Notes
VF-103 Jolly Rogers	F-14B Tomcat	
VFA-81 Sunliners	F/A-18C Hornet	
VFA-83 Rampagers	F/A-18C Hornet	
VA-75 Sunday Punchers	A-6E SWIP Intruder	Disestablished 21 Mar 1997 First and Last A-6 Intruder Squadron
VAQ-132 Scorpions	EA-6B Prowler	
VS-30 Diamondheads	S-3B Viking	
VAW-125 Tigertails/Torchbearers	E-2C Hawkeye	
HS-15 Red Lions	SH-60F/HH-60H Oceanhawk	
VQ-6 Black Ravens Det.C	ES-3A Shadow	

Theodore Roosevelt Carrier Battle Group (25 November 1996 – 22 May 1997)

- USS Theodore Roosevelt CVN-71
- USS Vella Gulf CG-72

Carrier Air Wing 3 - Tail Code: AC
Squadron	Aircraft	Notes
VF-32 Swordsmen	F-14A Tomcat	
VFA-37 Bulls	F/A-18C (N) Hornet	Night Attack Hornet
VFA-105 Gunslingers	F/A-18C (N) Hornet	Night Attack Hornet
VMFA-312 Checkerboards	F/A-18C (N) Hornet	Marine Corps Squadron
VAQ-130 Zappers	EA-6B Prowler	
VS-22 Checkmates	S-3B Viking	
VAW-126 Seahawks	E-2C Hawkeye	
HS-7 Dusty Dogs	SH-60F/HH-60H Oceanhawk	
VQ-6 Black Ravens Det.D	ES-3A Shadow	

=== 1997 ===
Constellation Carrier Battle Group (1 April 1997 – 1 October 1997)

- USS Constellation CV-64
- USS Chosin CG-65
- USS Lake Erie CG-70
- USS John Paul Jones DDG-53
- USS Merrill DD-976

Carrier Air Wing 2 - Tail Code: NE
Squadron	Aircraft	Notes
VF-2 Bounty Hunters	F-14D Super Tomcat	
VFA-151 Viginlantes	F/A-18C (N) Hornet	Night Attack Hornet
VFA-137 Kestrels	F/A-18C (N) Hornet	Night Attack Hornet
VMFA-323 Death Rattlers	F/A-18C (N) Hornet	Marine Corps Squadron
VAQ-131 Lancers	EA-6B Prowler	
VS-38 Red Griffins	S-3B Viking	
VAW-116 Sun Kings	E-2C Hawkeye	
HS-2 Golden Falcons	SH-60F/HH-60H Oceanhawk	
VQ-5 Sea Shadows Det.C	ES-3A Sea Shadow	

John F. Kennedy Carrier Battle Group (29 April 1997 – 28 October 1997)

- USS John F. Kennedy CV-67
- USS Vicksburg CG-69

Carrier Air Wing 8 - Tail Code: AJ
Squadron	Aircraft	Notes
VF-14 Tophatters	F-14A Tomcat	Equipped with LANTIRN
VF-41 Black Aces	F-14A Tomcat	Equipped with TARP
VFA-15 Valions	F/A-18C Hornet	
VFA-87 Golden Warriors	F/A-18C Hornet	
VAQ-141 Shadowhawks	EA-6B Prowler	
VS-24 Scouts	S-3B Viking	
VQ-6 Black Ravens Det A	ES-3A Shadow	
VAW-124 Bear Aces	E-2C Hawkeye	
HS-3 Tridents	SH-60F/HH-60H Oceanhawk	
VRC-40 Rawhides Det 4	C-2A Greyhounds	

Nimitz Carrier Battle Group (1 September 1997 – 1 March 1998)

- USS Nimitz CVN-68
- USS Lake Champlain CG-57
- USS Port Royal CG-73
- USS Kinkaid DD-965
- USS Ford FFG-54

Carrier Air Wing 9 - Tail Code: NG
Squadron	Aircraft	Notes
VF-211 Fighting Checkmates	F-14A Tomcat	
VFA-146 Blue Diamonds	F/A-18C (N) Hornet	Night Attack Hornet
VFA-147 Argonauts	F/A-18C (N) Hornet	Night Attack Hornet
VMFA-314 Black Knights	F/A-18C (N) Hornet	Night Attack Hornet. Marine Corps Squadron
VAQ-138 Yellow Jackets	EA-6B Prowler	
VS-33 Screwbirds	S-3B Viking	
VAW-112 Golden Hawks	E-2C Hawkeye	
HS-8 Eightballers	SH-60F/HH-60H Oceanhawk	
VQ-5 Sea Shadows Det.D	ES-3A Shadow	

George Washington Carrier Battle Group (3 October 1997 – 3 April 1998)

- USS George Washington CVN-73
- USS Normandy CG-60
- USS Carney DDG-64

Carrier Air Wing 1 - Tail Code: AB
Squadron	Aircraft	Notes
VF-102 Diamondbacks	F-14B Tomcat	
VFA-82 Marauders	F/A-18C Hornet	
VFA-86 Sidewinders	F/A-18C Hornet	
VMFA-251 Thunderbolts	F/A-18C Hornet	Marine Corps Squadron
VAQ-137 Rooks	EA-6B Prowler	
VS-32 Maulers	S-3B Viking	
VAW-123 Screwtops	E-2C Hawkeye	
HS-11 Dragon Slayers	SH-60F/HH-60H Oceanhawk	
VQ-6 Black Raven Det.B	ES-3A Shadow	
VRC-40 Rawhides Det 1	C-2A Greyhound	

=== 1998 ===
Independence Carrier Battle Group (23 January 1998 – 6 June 1998)

- USS Independence CV-62
- USS Bunker Hill CG-52
- USS John S. McCain DDG-56

This was the last cruise for USS Independence.

Carrier Air Wing 5 - Tail Code: NF
Squadron	Aircraft	Notes
VF-154 Black Knights	F-14A Tomcat	
VFA-27 Royal Maces	F/A-18C (N) Hornet	Night Attack Hornet
VFA-192 Golden Dragons	F/A-18C Hornet	
VFA-195 Dambusters	F/A-18C Hornet	
VAQ-136 Gauntlets	EA-6B Prowler	
VS-21 Redtails	S-3B Viking	
VAW-115 Liberty Bells	E-2C Hawkeye	
HS-14 Chargers	SH-60F/HH-60H Oceanhawk	
VQ-5 Sea Shadows Det.5	ES-3A Shadow	

John C. Stennis Carrier Battle Group (26 February 1998 – 26 August 1998)

- USS John C. Stennis CVN-74
- USS San Jacinto CG-56
- USS Cole DDG-67

This was the maiden voyage for USS John C. Stennis.

Carrier Air Wing 7 - Tail Code: AG
Squadron	Aircraft	Notes
VF-11 Red Rippers	F-14B Tomcat	
VF-143 Dogs	F-14B Tomcat	
VFA-131 Wildcats	F/A-18C Hornet	
VFA-136 Knighthawks	F/A-18C Hornet	
VAQ-140 Patriots	EA-6B Prowler	
VS-31 Topcats	S-3B Viking	
VAW-121 Bluetails	E-2C Hawkeye	
HS-5 Nightdippers	SH-60F/HH-60H Oceanhawk	
VQ-6 Black Ravens Det.C	ES-3A Shadow	

Dwight D. Eisenhower Carrier Battle Group (10 June 1998 – 10 December 1998)

- USS Dwight D. Eisenhower CVN-69
- USS Anzio CG-68
- USS Cape St. George CG-71
- USS Arleigh Burke DDG-51

Carrier Air Wing 17 - Tail Code: AA
Squadron	Aircraft	Notes
VF-103 Jolly Rogers	F-14B Tomcat	
VFA-34 Blue Blasters	F/A-18C Hornet	
VFA-81 Sunliners	F/A-18C Hornet	
VFA-83 Rampagers	F/A-18C Hornet	
VAQ-132 Scorpions	EA-6B Prowler	
VS-30 Diamondheads	S-3B Viking	
VAW-125 Tigertails/Torchbearers	E-2C Hawkeye	
HS-15 Red Lions	SH-60F/HH-60H Oceanhawk	
VQ-6 Black Ravens Det.D	ES-3A Shadow	

Abraham Lincoln Carrier Battle Group (11 June 1998 – 11 December 1998)

- USS Abraham Lincoln CVN-72
- USS Valley Forge CG-50
- USS Shiloh CG-67
- USS Elliot DD-967
- USS Jarrett FFG-33

Carrier Air Wing 14 - Tail Code: NK
Squadron	Aircraft	Notes
VF-31 Tomcatters	F-14D Super Tomcat	
VFA-25 Fist of the Fleet	F/A-18C (N) Hornet	Night Attack Hornet
VFA-113 Stingers	F/A-18C (N) Hornet	Night Attack Hornet
VFA-115 Eagles	F/A-18C Hornet	
VAQ-139 Cougars	EA-6B Prowler	Changed modex from 620 to 500
VS-35 Blue Wolves	S-3B Viking	
VAW-113 Black Eagles	E-2C Hawkeye	
HS-4 Black Knights	SH-60F/HH-60H Oceanhawk	
VQ-5 Sea Shadows Det.B	ES-3A Shadow	

Enterprise Carrier Battle Group (6 November 1998 – 6 May 1999)

- USS Enterprise CVN-65
- USS Philippine Sea CG-58
- USS Gettysburg CG-64
- USS Stout DDG-55
- USS Nicholson DD-982
- USS Halyer DD-997
- USS Carr FFG-52
- USS Miami SSN-755
- USS Hampton SSN-767
- USS Detroit AOE-4

The Enterprise Battle Group participated in Operation Desert Fox.

Carrier Air Wing 3 - Tail Code: AC
Squadron	Aircraft	Notes
VF-32 Swordsmen	F-14B Tomcat	
VFA-37 Bulls	F/A-18C (N) Hornet	Night Attack Hornet
VFA-105 Gunslingers	F/A-18C (N) Hornet	Night Attack Hornet
VMFA-312 Checkerboards	F/A-18C (N) Hornet	Marine Corps Squadron
VAQ-130 Zappers	EA-6B Prowler	
VS-22 Checkmates	S-3B Viking	
VAW-126 Seahawks	E-2C Hawkeye	
HS-7 Dusty Dogs	SH-60F/HH-60H Oceanhawk	
VQ-6 Black Ravens Det.A	ES-3A Shadow	

Carl Vinson Carrier Battle Group (6 November 1998 – 6 May 1999)

- USS Carl Vinson CVN-70
- USS Antietam CG-54
- USS Princeton CG-59
- USS Fitzgerald DDG-62
- USS Oldendorf DD-972
- USS McClusky FFG-41
- USS Pasadena SSN-752
- USS Columbus SSN-762
- USS Rainier AOE-7

Carl Vinson Battle Group also participated in Operation Desert Fox.

Carrier Air Wing 11 - Tail Code: NH
Squadron	Aircraft	Notes
VF-213 Black Lions	F-14D Super Tomcat	
VFA-22 Fighting Redcocks	F/A-18C (N) Hornet	Night Attack Hornet
VFA-94 Mighty Shrikes	F/A-18C (N) Hornet	Night Attack Hornet
VFA-97 Warhawks	F/A-18A Hornet	
VAQ-135 Black Ravens	EA-6B Prowler	
VS-29 Dragonflies	S-3B Viking	
VAW-117 Wallbangers	E-2C Hawkeye	
HS-6 Indians	SH-60F/HH-60H Oceanhawk	
VQ-5 Sea Shadows Det.C	ES-3A Shadow	

=== 1999 ===
Kitty Hawk Carrier Battle Group (2 March 1999 – 25 August 1999)

- USS Kitty Hawk CV-63
- USS Chancellorsville CG-62
- USS Curtis Wilbur DDG-54

In 1998, Kitty Hawk would replace the Independence as the forward deployed carrier in Japan.

Carrier Air Wing 5 - Tail Code: NF
Squadron	Aircraft	Notes
VF-154 Black Knights	F-14A Tomcat	
VFA-27 Royal Maces	F/A-18C (N) Hornet	Night Attack Hornet
VFA-192 Golden Dragons	F/A-18C (N) Hornet	Night Attack Hornet
VFA-195 Dambusters	F/A-18C (N) Hornet	Night Attack Hornet
VAQ-136 Gauntlets	EA-6B Prowler	
VS-21 Redtails	S-3B Viking	
VAW-115 Liberty Bells	E-2C Hawkeye	
HS-14 Chargers	SH-60F/HH-60H Oceanhawk	

Theodore Roosevelt Carrier Battle Group (26 March 1999 – 22 September 1999)

- USS Theodore Roosevelt CVN-71
- USS Leyte Gulf CG-55

Carrier Air Wing 8 - Tail Code: AJ
Squadron	Aircraft	Notes
VF-14 Tophatters	F-14A Tomcat	
VF-41 Black Aces	F-14A Tomcat	
VFA-15 Valions	F/A-18C (N) Hornet	Night Attack Hornet
VFA-87 Golden Warriors	F/A-18C (N) Hornet	Night Attack Hornet
VAQ-141 Shadowhawks	EA-6B Prowler	
VS-24 Scouts	S-3B Viking	
VAW-124 Bear Aces	E-2C Hawkeye	
HS-3 Tridents	SH-60F/HH-60H Oceanhawk	
VRC-40 Rawhides Det 1	C-2A Greyhounds	

Constellation Carrier Battle Group (18 June 1999 – 17 December 1999)

- USS Constellation CV-64
- USS Chosin CG-65
- USS Lake Erie CG-70
- USS Benfold DDG-65
- USS Kinkaid DD-965
- USCGC Midgett WHEC-726

Carrier Air Wing 2 - Tail Code: NE
Squadron	Aircraft	Notes
VF-2 Bounty Hunters	F-14D Super Tomcat	
VFA-151 Viginlantes	F/A-18C (N) Hornet	Night Attack Hornet
VFA-137 Kestrels	F/A-18C (N) Hornet	Night Attack Hornet
VMFA-323 Death Rattlers	F/A-18C (N) Hornet	Marine Corps Squadron
VAQ-131 Lancers	EA-6B Prowler	VAQ-131 deployed to MCAS Iwakuni in Japan ahead of CVW-2 in June 1999 and rejoined the Air Wing when CV-64 arrived in the Sea of Japan in July.
VS-38 Red Griffins	S-3B Viking	All Six S-3B were given to VS-21 in early December 1999 in Hawaii.
VAW-116 Sun Kings	E-2C Hawkeye	
HS-2 Golden Falcons	SH-60F/HH-60H Oceanhawk	

John F. Kennedy Carrier Battle Group (22 September 1999 – 19 March 2000)

- USS John F. Kennedy CV-67
- USS Monterey CG-61
- USS Carney DDG-64
- USS The Sullivans DDG-68
- USS McFaul DDG-74
- USS Seattle AOE-3

Carrier Air Wing 1 - Tail Code: AB
22 September 1999 – 19 March 2000
Squadron	Aircraft	Notes
VF-102 Diamondbacks	F-14B Tomcat	
VFA-82 Marauders	F/A-18C Hornet	
VFA-86 Sidewinders	F/A-18C Hornet	
VMFA-251 Thunderbolts	F/A-18C Hornet	Marine Corps Squadron
VS-32 Maulers	S-3B Viking	
VAW-123 Screwtops	E-2C Hawkeye	
VAQ-137 Rooks	EA-6B Prowler	
HS-11 Dragon Slayers	SH-60F/HH-60H Oceanhawk	

=== 2000 ===
John C. Stennis Carrier Battle Group (7 January 2000 – 3 July 2000)

- USS John C. Stennis CVN-74
- USS Lake Champlain CG-57
- USS Port Royal CG-73
- USS Russell DDG-59
- USS Elliot DD-967
- USS Rentz FFG-46
- USS Asheville SSN-758
- USS Jefferson City SSN-759
- USS Bridge AOE-10

Carrier Air Wing 9 - Tail Code: NG
Squadron	Aircraft	Notes
VF-211 Fighting Checkmates	F-14A Tomcat	
VFA-146 Blue Diamonds	F/A-18C (N) Hornet	Night Attack Hornet
VFA-147 Argonauts	F/A-18C (N) Hornet	Night Attack Hornet
VMFA-314 Black Knights	F/A-18C (N) Hornet	Night Attack Hornet. Marine Corps Squadron
VAQ-138 Yellow Jackets	EA-6B Prowler	
VS-33 Screwbirds	S-3B Viking	
VAW-112 Golden Hawks	E-2C Hawkeye	
VRC-30 Providers Det 4	C-2A Greyhound	
HS-8 Eightballers	SH-60F/HH-60H Oceanhawk	

=== USS Kitty Hawk CV-63 ===
- USS Kitty Hawk CV-63
- USS Chancellorsville CG-62
- USS Cowpens CG-63
- USS John S. McCain DDG-56
- USS O'Brien DD-975
- USS Cushing DD-985
- USS Gary FFG-51
- USS Vandegrift FFG-48
- USS Bremerton SSN-698

Carrier Air Wing 5 - Tail Code: NF
23 January 2003 – 6 May 2003 (Later Operation Iraqi Freedom)
Squadron	Aircraft	Notes
VF-154 Black Knights	F-14A Tomcat	Renamed VFA-154 in September 2003 Transitioned to F/A-18F
VFA-27 Royal Maces	F/A-18C (N) Hornet	Night Attack Hornet
VFA-192 Golden Dragons	F/A-18C (N) Hornet	Night Attack Hornet
VFA-195 Dambusters	F/A-18C (N) Hornet	Night Attack Hornet
VAQ-136 Gauntlets	EA-6B Prowler	
VS-21 Redtails	S-3B Viking	
VAW-115 Liberty Bells	E-2C Hawkeye	
HS-14 Chargers	SH-60F/HH-60H Oceanhawk	

=== USS Constellation CV-64 ===
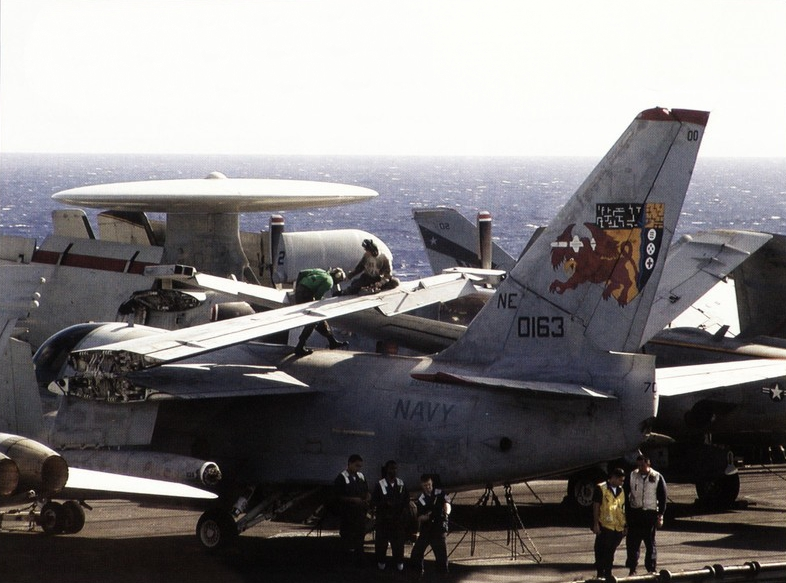
BuNo 160163, An S-3B Viking VS-38 aboard the USS Constellation CV-64 during the deployment to the Western Pacific and the Indian Ocean in 2001.

- USS Constellation CV-64
- USS Chosin CG-65
- USS Benfold DDG-65
- USS Kinkaid DD-965
- USS Thach FFG-43
- HMCS Winnipeg FFH-338
- USS Santa Fe SSN-763
- USS Columbia SSN-771
- USS Rainier AOE-7

Carrier Air Wing 2 - Tail Code: NE
16 March 2001 – 15 September 2001
Squadron	Aircraft	Notes
VF-2 Bounty Hunters	F-14D Super Tomcat	
VFA-151 Viginlantes	F/A-18C (N) Hornet	Night Attack Hornet
VFA-137 Kestrels	F/A-18C (N) Hornet	Night Attack Hornet
VMFA-323 Death Rattlers	F/A-18C (N) Hornet	Marine Corps Squadron
VAQ-131 Lancers	EA-6B Prowler	
VS-38 Red Griffins	S-3B Viking	
VAW-116 Sun Kings	E-2C Hawkeye	
HS-2 Golden Falcons	SH-60F/HH-60H Oceanhawk	
HSL-47 Saberhawks Det. 4	SH-60B Seahawk	

- USS Constellation CV-64
- USS Valley Forge CG-50
- USS Bunker Hill CG-52
- USS Higgins DDG-76
- USS Milius DDG-69
- USS Thach FFG-43
- USS Columbia SSN-771
- USS Rainier AOE-7

Carrier Air Wing 2 - Tail Code: NE
2 November 2002 – 2 June 2003 (Operation Iraqi Freedom)
Squadron	Aircraft	Notes
VF-2 Bounty Hunters	F-14D Super Tomcat	VF-2 redesignated VFA-2 on 1 July 2003.
VFA-151 Viginlantes	F/A-18C (N) Hornet	Night Attack Hornet
VFA-137 Kestrels	F/A-18C (N) Hornet	Night Attack Hornet
VMFA-323 Death Rattlers	F/A-18C (N) Hornet	Marine Corps Squadron
VAQ-131 Lancers	EA-6B Prowler	
VS-38 Red Griffins	S-3B Viking	
VAW-116 Sun Kings	E-2C Hawkeye	
HS-2 Golden Falcons	SH-60F/HH-60H Oceanhawk	
HSL-47 Saberhawks Det. 4	SH-60B Seahawk	

=== USS Enterprise CVN-65 ===
- USS Enterprise CVN-65
- USS Philippine Sea CG-58
- USS Gettysburg CG-64
- USS Stout DDG-55
- USS Gonzales DDG-66
- USS McFaul DDG-74
- USS Nicholson DD-982
- USS Thorn DD-988
- USS Nicholas FFG-47
- USS Jacksonville SSN-699
- USS Providence SSN-719
- USS Arctic AOE-8

Carrier Air Wing 8 - Tail Code: AJ
25 April 2001 – 10 November 2001 (Including Operation Enduring Freedom)
Squadron	Aircraft	Notes
VF-41 Black Aces	F-14A Tomcat	VF-41 redesignated VFA-41 in December 2001
VF-14 Tophatters	F-14A Tomcat	VF-14 redesignated VFA-14 in December 2001
VFA-15 Valions	F/A-18C (N) Hornet	Night Attack Hornet
VFA-87 Golden Warriors	F/A-18C (N) Hornet	Night Attack Hornet
VAQ-141 Shadowhawks	EA-6B Prowler	
VS-24 Scouts	S-3B Viking	
VAW-124 Bear Aces	E-2C Hawkeye	
HS-3 Tridents	SH-60F/HH-60H Oceanhawk	
VRC-40 Rawhides Det 1	C-2A Greyhound	

=== USS Carl Vinson CVN-70 ===
- USS Carl Vinson CVN-70
- USS Antietam CG-54
- USS Princeton CG-59
- USS John Paul Jones DDG-53
- USS O'Kane DDG-77
- USS Ingraham FFG-61
- USS Olympia SSN-717
- USS Key West SSN-722
- USS Sacramento AOE-1
- USNS Niagara Falls T-AFS-3

Carrier Air Wing 11 - Tail Code: NH
July 23, 2001 – January 19, 2002 (Including Operation Enduring Freedom)
Squadron	Aircraft	Notes
VF-213 Black Lions	F-14D Super Tomcat	
VFA-22 Fighting Redcocks	F/A-18C (N) Hornet	Night Attack Hornet
VFA-94 Mighty Shrikes	F/A-18C (N) Hornet	Night Attack Hornet
VFA-97 Warhawks	F/A-18A Hornet	
VAQ-135 Black Ravens	EA-6B Prowler	
VS-29 Dragonflies	S-3B Viking	
VAW-117 Wallbangers	E-2C Hawkeye	
HS-6 Indians	SH-60F/HH-60H Oceanhawk	

=== USS Abraham Lincoln CVN-72 ===
- USS Abraham Lincoln CVN-72
- USS Bunker Hill CG-52
- USS Shiloh CG-67
- USS Paul Hamilton DDG-60
- USS Fletcher DD-992
- USS Crommelin FFG-37
- USS Tucson SSN-770
- USS Cheyenne SSN-773
- USS Camden AOE-2

Carrier Air Wing 14 - Tail Code: NK
17 August 2000 – 12 February 2001
Squadron	Aircraft	Notes
VF-31 Tomcatters	F-14D Super Tomcat	
VFA-25 Fist of the Fleet	F/A-18C (N) Hornet	Night Attack Hornet
VFA-113 Stingers	F/A-18C (N) Hornet	Night Attack Hornet
VFA-115 Eagles	F/A-18C Hornet	
VAQ-139 Cougars	EA-6B Prowler	
VS-35 Blue Wolves	S-3B Viking	
VAW-113 Black Eagles	E-2C Hawkeye	
HS-4 Black Knights	SH-60F/HH-60H Oceanhawk	

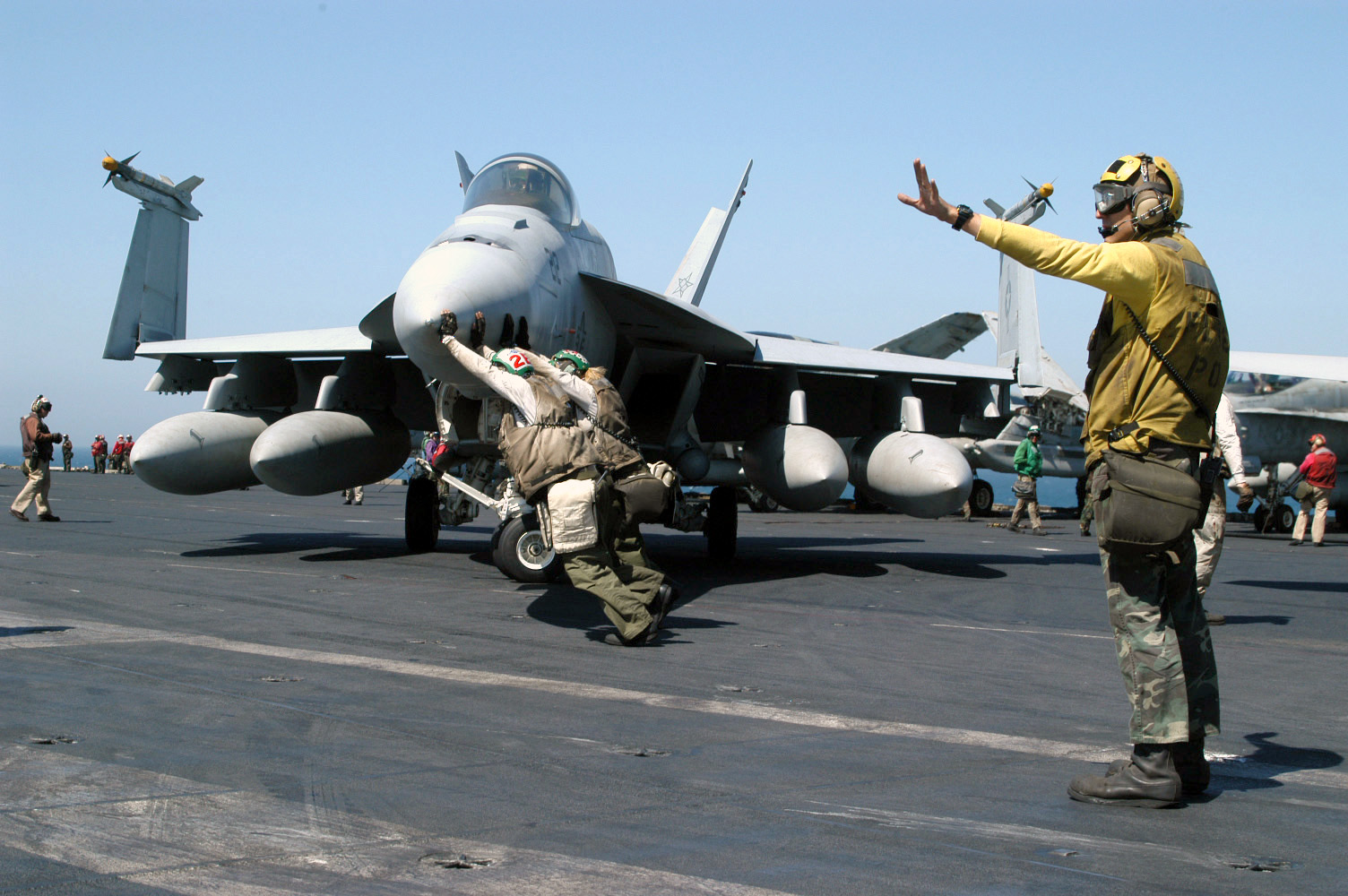
Sailors push an F/A-18E Super Hornet of VFA-115 to aid the handlers in directing it around the flight deck aboard USS Abraham Lincoln CVN-72 on 2 April 2003 during OIF.

- USS Abraham Lincoln CVN-72
- USS Mobile Bay CG-53
- USS Shiloh CG-67
- USS Paul Hamilton DDG-60
- USS Fletcher DD-992
- USS Reuben James FFG-57
- USS Honolulu SSN-718
- USS Camden AOE-2

Carrier Air Wing 14 - Tail Code: NK
20 July 2002 – 6 May 2003 (Later Operation Iraqi Freedom) Longest Carrier deployment since 1973 until 2020
Squadron	Aircraft	Notes
VF-31 Tomcatters	F-14D Super Tomcat	
VFA-25 Fist of the Fleet	F/A-18C (N) Hornet	Night Attack Hornet
VFA-113 Stingers	F/A-18C (N) Hornet	Night Attack Hornet
VFA-115 Eagles	F/A-18E Super Hornet	First deployment of the F/A-18 Super Hornet
VAQ-139 Cougars	EA-6B Prowler	
VS-35 Blue Wolves	S-3B Viking	
VAW-113 Black Eagles	E-2C Hawkeye	
HS-4 Black Knights	SH-60F/HH-60H Oceanhawk	

== Units in Operation Provide Comfort (1991-1996) and Operation Northern Watch (1997-2003) ==
=== USS Forrestal CV-59 ===
This was USS Forrestal's last deployment.

- USS Forrestal CV-59
- USS Deyo DD-989

Carrier Air Wing 6 - Tail Code: AE
30 May 1991 – 21 December 1991
Squadron	Aircraft	Notes
VF-11 Red Rippers	F-14A Tomcat	Moved to CVW-14
VF-31 Tomcatters	F-14A Tomcat	Moved to CVW-14
VFA-132 Privateers	F/A-18A Hornet	Disestablished 1 Jun 1992
VFA-137 Kestrels	F/A-18A Hornet	Moved to CVW-2
VA-176 Thunderbolts	A-6E TRAM Intruder	Disestablished 30 Oct 1992
VAQ-133 Wizards	EA-6B Prowler	
VS-28 Gamblers	S-3B Viking	Disestablished 1 Oct 1992
VAW-122 Steeljaws	E-2C Hawkeye	Disestablished 31 Mar 1996
HS-15 Red Lions	SH-3H Sea King	

=== USS Theodore Roosevelt CVN-71 ===
- USS Theodore Roosevelt CVN-71
- USS Richmond K. Turner CG-20
- USS Leyte Gulf CG-55

Carrier Air Wing 8 - Tail Code: AJ
28 December 1990 – 28 June 1991* (Took part after the Gulf War ended from 22 April)
Squadron	Aircraft	Notes
VF-41 Black Aces	F-14A Tomcat	
VF-84 Jolly Rogers	F-14A Tomcat	
VFA-15 Valions	F/A-18A Hornet	
VFA-87 Golden Warriors	F/A-18A Hornet	
VA-36 Roadrunners	A-6E TRAM Intruder	
VA-65 Tigers	A-6E TRAM Intruder	This was VA-65's last deployment before retirement in 1993.
VAQ-141 Shadowhawks	EA-6B Prowler	
VS-24 Scouts	S-3B Viking	
VAW-124 Bear Aces	E-2C Hawkeye	
HS-9 Sea Griffins	SH-3H Sea King	
VRC-40 Rawhides Detachment D	C-2A Greyhounds	
