= 222 Squadron PN =

222 Squadron
- ۲۲۲ سکواڈرن
- Active: Since 1994
- Country: Pakistan
- Allegiance: Pakistan Navy
- Branch: Pakistan Naval Air Arm
- Type: Squadron
- Role: Anti-submarine warfare & Anti-surface warfare
- Station: PNS Mehran
- Nickname: Stingrays
- Mascot: A Stingray
- Anniversaries: 8 September (Navy day)
- Helicopters: Harbin Z-9EC

Aircraft flown
- Multirole helicopter: Harbin Z-9EC; Westland Lynx

222 ASW Squadron also known as the Stingrays is a helicopter squadron from the Pakistan Naval Air Arm which specializes in Anti-submarine warfare. It is stationed at PNS Mehran in Karachi and flies Harbin Z-9EC helicopters out of its home base and various ships of the Pakistan Navy.

Established in 1994 with three Westland Lynx armed choppers acquired from the UK, the 222 Squadron started flying operations from PNS Mehran but faced problems with its Lynx helicopters due to shortage of spares such that by 2008, the squadron had grounded them. In 2009, the Navy purchased 6 modern Z-9EC multi-purpose choppers which were manufactured by Harbin and allotted them to the 222 Squadron. Equipped with Radars, ESM and Sonar equipment, the induction of Z-9ECs restarted flying operations in the 222 squadron.

== See also ==
- HSC-5
