= VQ-6 =

U.S. Navy's Atlantic Fleet

VQ-6 Black Ravens
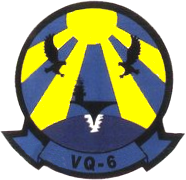
- Active: 5 August 1991 – 30 September 1999
- Country: United States
- Branch: United States Navy
- Engagements: Operation Southern Watch Operation Deny Flight Operation Desert Fox

Fleet Air Reconnaissance Squadron 6 (VQ-6) was a former squadron of the U.S. Navy's Atlantic Fleet. During its short-lived career, it was the second of two squadrons to operate the ES-3A Shadow, an ELINT version of the Lockheed S-3 Viking.

== History ==
=== Early years ===
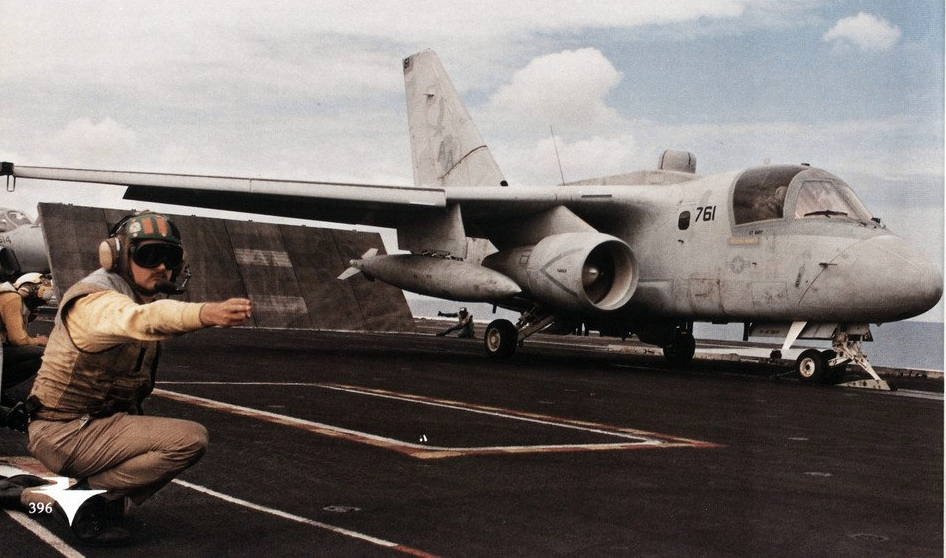
an ES-3A Shadow from VQ-6 Det.A being launched from USS Saratoga CV-60 in 1994 during VQ-6's first cruise.

VQ-6 was founded on 5 August 1991, at NAS Cecil Field in Jacksonville, Florida. This was after the only carrier capable ELINT aircraft at the time, the EA-3B Skywarrior, was retired from service by VQ-2. After VQ-5 received the ES-3A in May 1992, VQ-6 became the second to receive the aircraft on 19 August 1992. A year later between 13 April 1993, and 18 May 1993, the squadron participated in workup trials on the USS America CV-66.

VQ-6 Detachment A made their first deployment on the USS Saratoga CV-60 between 12 January and 24 June 1994, as part of Carrier Air Wing 17 (CVW-17). This would be the only deployment they would make on the carrier. During their thirteen deployments, they participated in Operation Southern Watch as well as NATO operations in Bosnia from the USS Theodore Roosevelt CVN-71 and the America. Other Carriers that VQ-6 deployed onboard included USS Washington CVN-73 (including its maiden cruise in 1994) as part of CVW-7 and CVW-1, USS Dwight D. Eisenhower CVN-69 as part of CVW-3, USS John F. Kennedy CV-67 with CVW-8 and the USS John C. Stennis CVN-74 during a world cruise with CVW-7 in 1998. During workups for that cruise in October 1997, the squadron along with the Stennis was featured in an episode of the Discovery Channel documentary series Extreme Machines.

=== Final Years ===
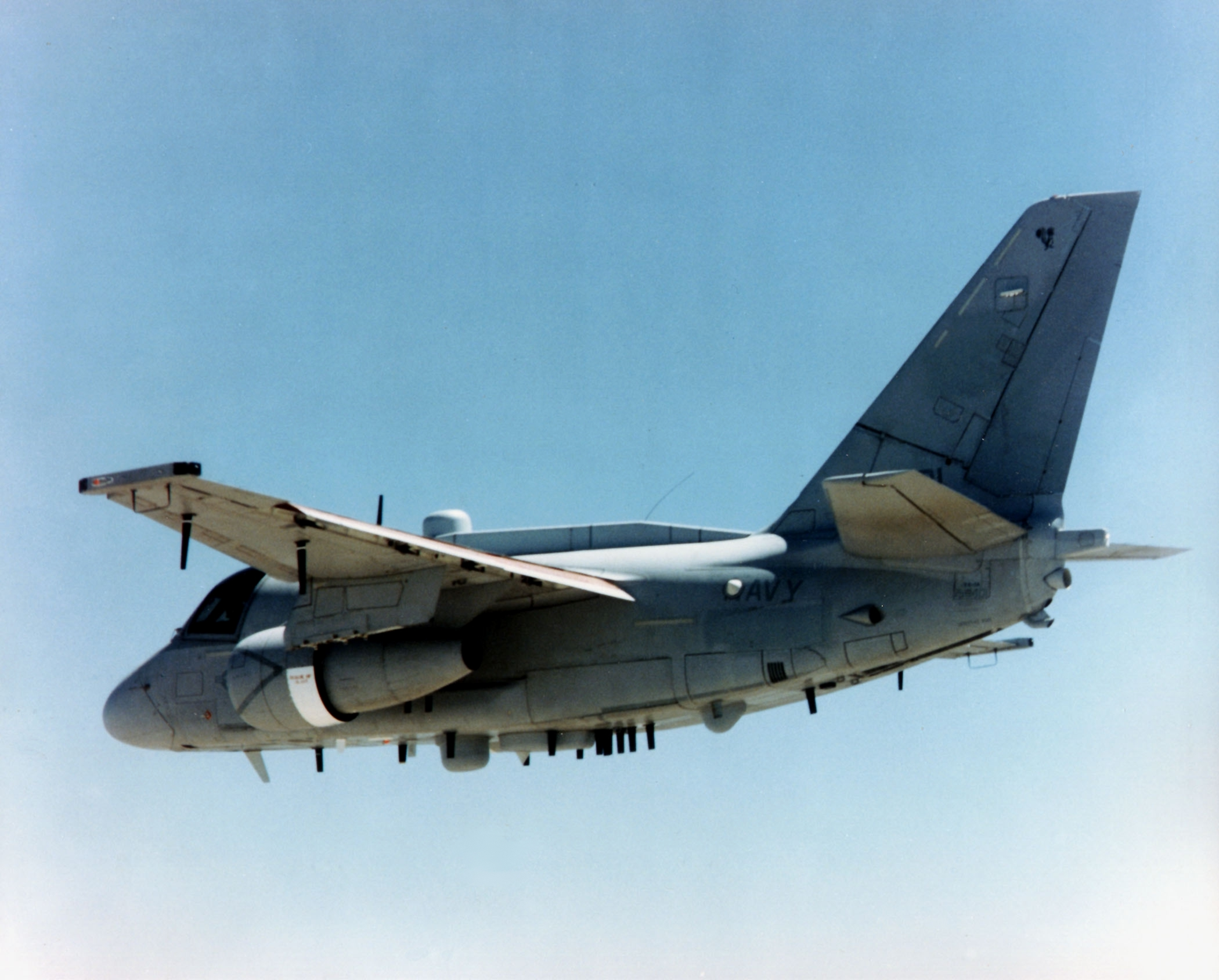
An Lockheed ES-3A Shadow (BuNo 159401) VQ-6 in flight off the Florida coast. This aircraft was retired to the AMARC in Arizona as 2S0036 on 24 February 1999 and scrapped on 8 January 2003.

During their last deployment, the squadron made their last deployment as Detachment A on the USS Enterprise CVN-65 as part of CVW-3, taking part in the strikes conducted in Operation Desert Fox.

On 10 August 1999, the last ES-3A were sent to AMARC at Davis-Monthan AFB in Arizona. After this, on the 26th, a ceremony was held before the squadron was finally decommissioned on 30 September 1999.

== See also ==
- VQ-5 Sea Shadows
- ES-3A Sea Shadow
