= VFA-82 =

Strike Fighter Squadron 82
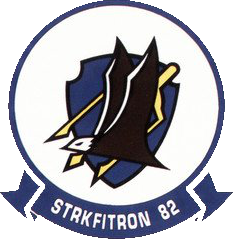
- VFA-82 insignia
- Active: 1 May 1967 – 30 September 2005
- Country: United States
- Branch: United States Navy
- Type: All Weather Attack
- Part of: Inactive
- Nickname: Marauders

Aircraft flown
- Attack: A-7 Corsair II; F/A-18 Hornet

VFA-82, Strike Fighter Squadron 82, known as the Marauders was a U.S. Navy strike fighter squadron formerly based at MCAS Beaufort, South Carolina, established in 1967 and deactivated in 2005. Its radio callsign was Streetcar.

== History ==
Attack Squadron 82 (VA-82) was established on 1 May 1967 as a light attack squadron flying the Vought A-7A Corsair II.

The Marauders made their first deployment aboard USS America during her maiden cruise to the waters off North Vietnam in April 1968. They returned to Southeast Asia in September 1969 aboard USS Coral Sea.

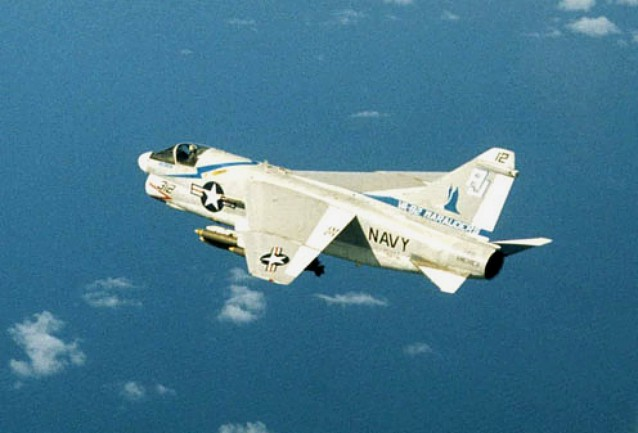
VA-82 A-7C over Vietnam

The Marauders transitioned to the A-7E in August 1970, but in late spring of 1972, VA-82 was forced to revert to the A-7C due to unexpected problems with the A-7E's TF-41 engines. The Marauders then deployed from June 1972 to March 1973 aboard USS America for a ten-month combat cruise.

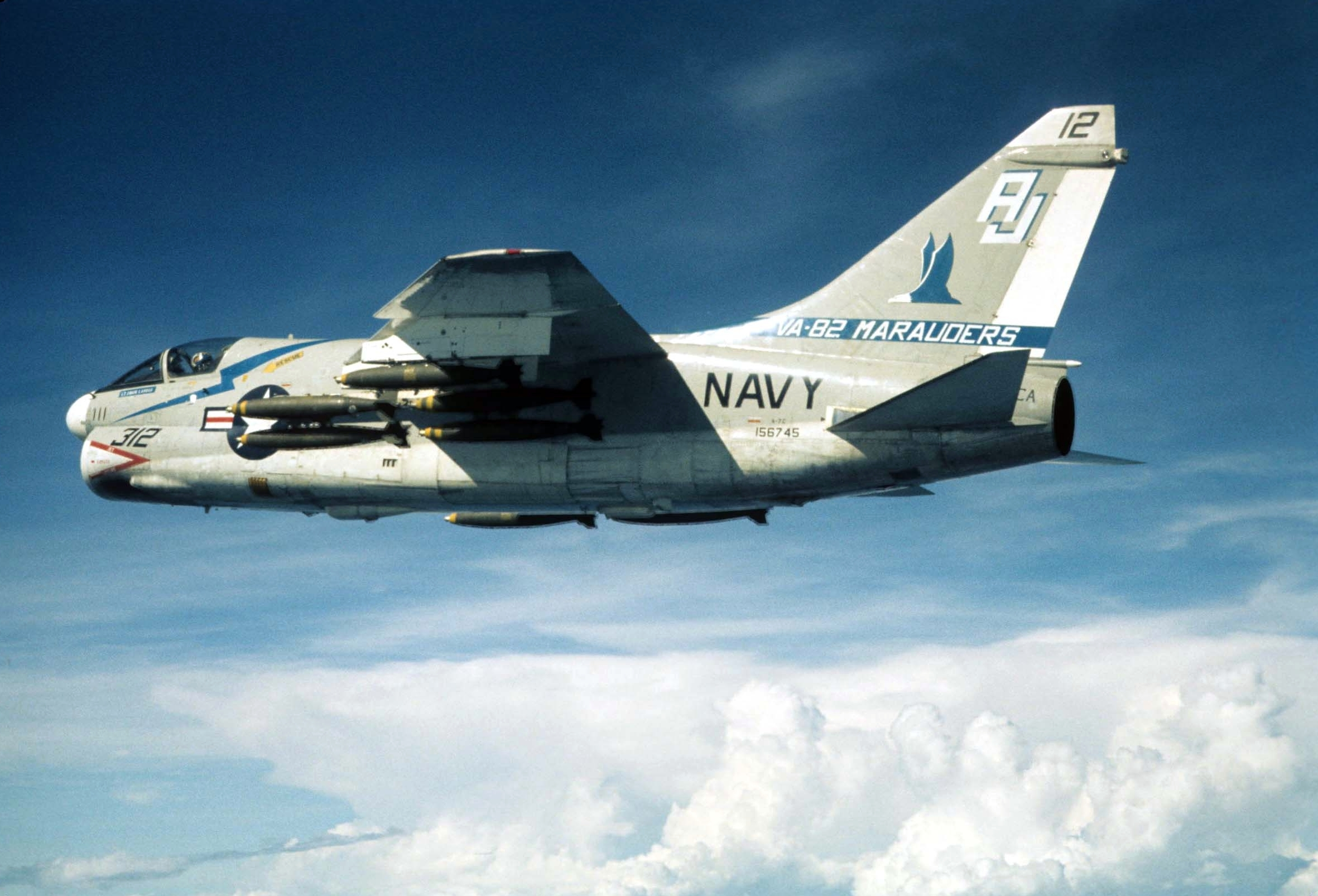
VA-82 A-7C over Vietnam c.1972

On that deployment, VA-82 played a role in the attack that destroyed the Thanh Hoa Bridge, a vital link in the North Vietnamese Army supply lines and a target that seemed indestructible during the Vietnam War. Four A-7Cs from VA-82 successfully delivered 16,000 lb (7,300 kg) of high explosives with two planes carrying two 2,000 lb (910 kg) Walleyes, while two other carried two, 2,000 lb Mk 84 bombs. In a simultaneous attack, the centre piling on the bridge was hit, and the span broke in half. After this, the Thanh Hoa bridge was considered permanently destroyed and removed from the target list.

The squadron made several deployments to the Mediterranean during the 1970s, and while doing so received many of the Navy's most prestigious awards including the Wade McClusky Award as most outstanding attack squadron and Battle "E" in 1976. In 1975 the Marauders deployed aboard USS Nimitz on her maiden cruise.

The squadron completed its last cruise with the A-7E Corsair II in June 1987. On 13 July 1987, VA-82 was redesignated Strike Fighter Squadron 82 (VFA-82). With the delivery of the first aircraft in November 1987, VFA-82 became the first F/A-18C squadron.

In 1990, VFA-82 escorted USS Constellation around the horn of South America on its way to Philadelphia, Pennsylvania for modernization. December 1990 found VFA-82 once again aboard USS America, participating in Operation Desert Shield and Operation Desert Storm. The Marauders flew 597 combat sorties, 1308.9 combat hours and delivered over 1.2 million pounds of ordnance over Iraq. In December 1993, the Marauders returned to USS America for a six-month deployment during which VFA-82 participated in Operation Southern Watch in Iraq, Operation Deny Flight and Operation Sharp Guard in Bosnia and Operation Restore Hope in Somalia.

From August 1995 to February 1996, the Marauders joined USS America for her last cruise. From October 1997 through April 1998, the squadron deployed on board USS George Washington to the Mediterranean Sea and Persian Gulf in support of Operation Southern Watch. During 1998 the Marauders operated from the decks of three U.S. aircraft carriers and visited seven countries. In August 1999, the Marauders bid farewell to NAS Cecil Field and relocated to NAS Jacksonville for the two months prior to deployment. In September 1999, the Marauders deployed on board USS John F. Kennedy in support of Operation Southern Watch. Upon completion of the six-month deployment on board "Big John," the Marauders relocated to their new home, MCAS Beaufort, South Carolina in March 2000.

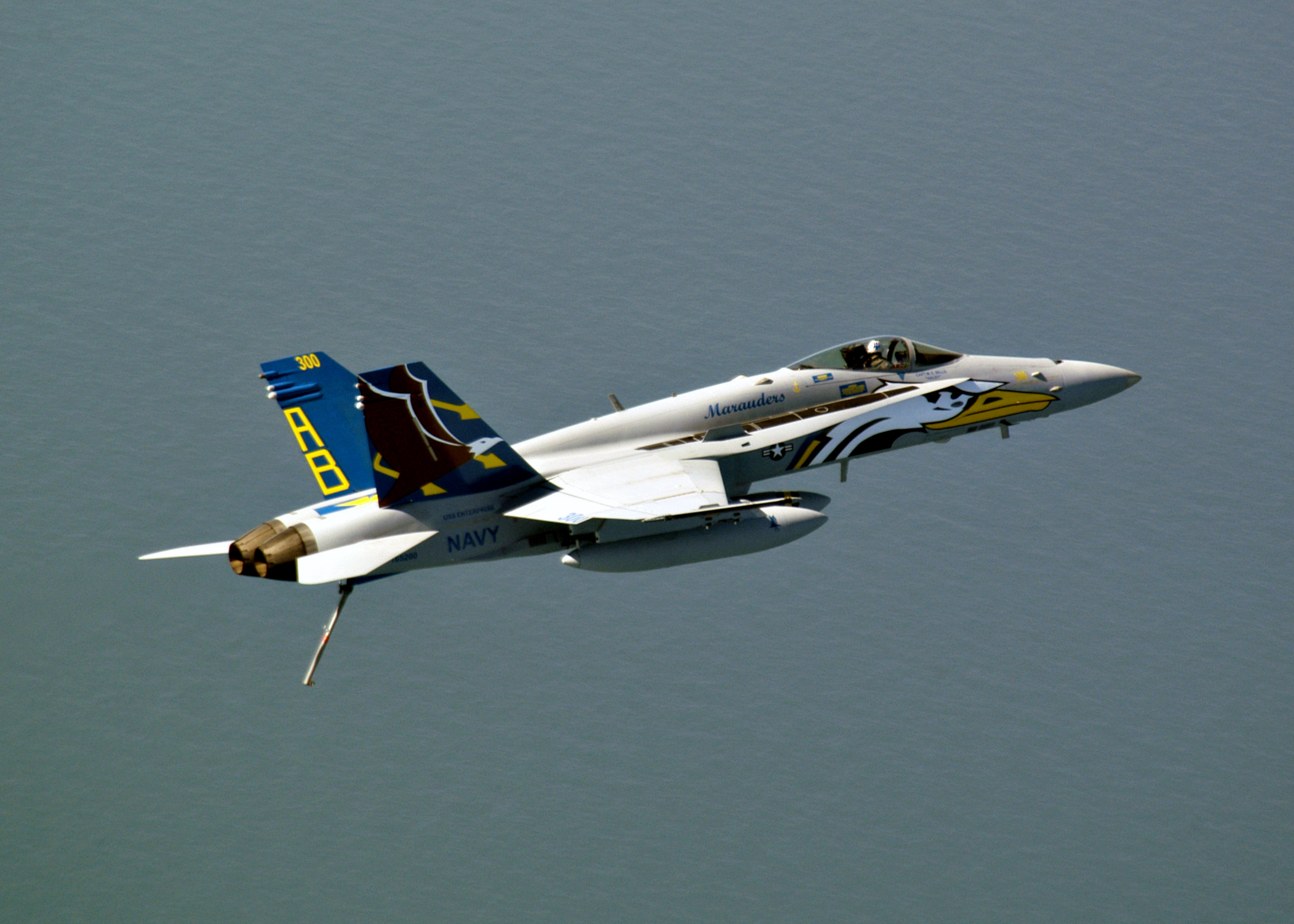
"CAG Bird" F/A-18C from VFA-82 in 2004

Following the September 11, 2001 attacks, the Marauders deployed on 18 September, steaming for the Arabian Sea and Afghanistan. During four months of combat operations, VFA-82 delivered over 440,000 lb (200,000 kg) of ordnance and totaled over 3000 hours in support of Operation Enduring Freedom. The Marauders returned to Beaufort on 28 March 2002. The squadron had logged an unprecedented 159 days continuously deployed, the majority of which were combat operations.

During the latter half of 2002, the squadron trained against F-16 Falcons in Burlington, Vermont, and at one point were detached to Roosevelt Roads Naval Station, Puerto Rico; NAS Fallon; and NAS Key West. During the NAS Key West detachment, Marauders pilots had the opportunity to fly against German Air Force MiG-29s. VFA-82 was disestablished effective 30 September 2005 in accordance with a directive issued on 5 July 2005.

== See also ==
- History of the United States Navy
- List of inactive United States Navy aircraft squadrons
- List of United States Navy aircraft squadrons
