= USS Valley Forge (CG-50) =

Ticonderoga-class cruiser

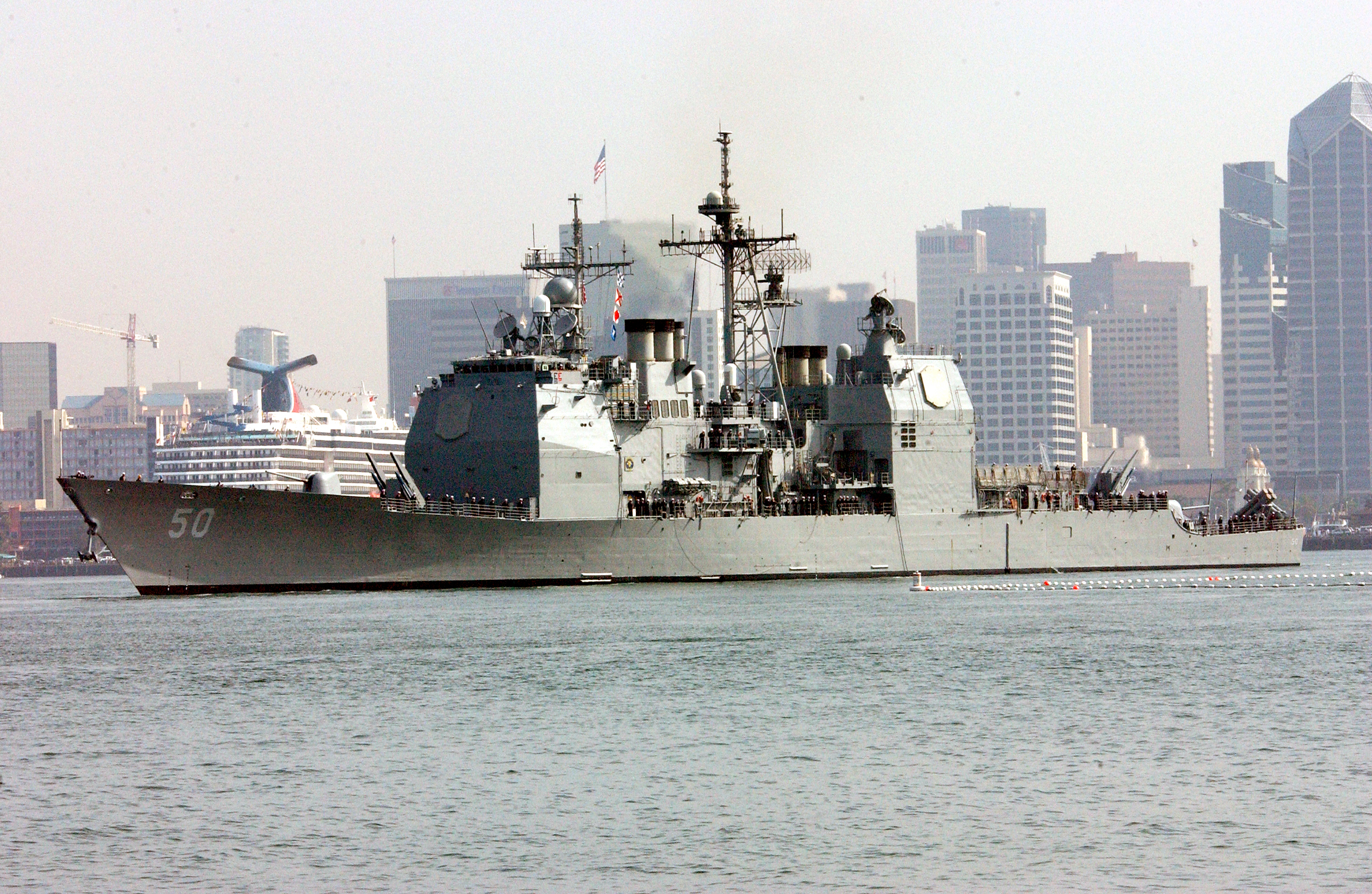
- USS Valley Forge in San Diego on 2 November 2002

History

United States
- Name: Valley Forge
- Namesake: Valley Forge
- Ordered: 28 August 1981
- Builder: Ingalls Shipbuilding
- Laid down: 14 April 1983
- Launched: 23 June 1984
- Christened: 29 September 1984
- Commissioned: 18 January 1986
- Decommissioned: 30 August 2004
- Stricken: 30 August 2004
- Identification: Call sign: NVFP; Pennant number: CG-50
- Motto: First In War - First In Peace
- Fate: Sunk as target, 2 November 2006
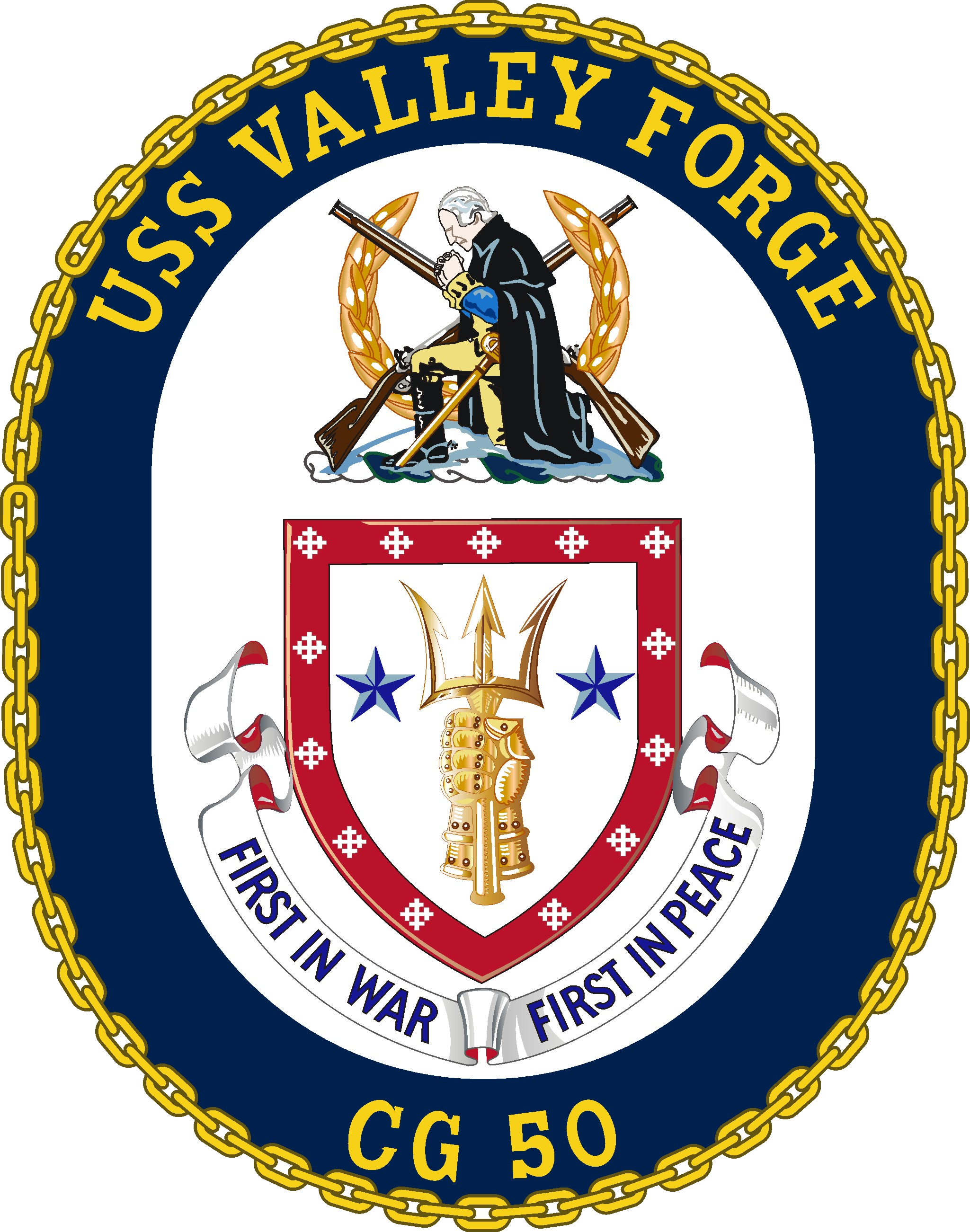
- Badge

General characteristics
- Class & type: Ticonderoga-class cruiser
- Displacement: Approx. 9,600 long tons (9,800 t) full load
- Length: 567 feet (173 m)
- Beam: 55 feet (16.8 meters)
- Draft: 34 feet (10.2 meters)
- Propulsion: 4 × General Electric LM2500 gas turbine engines; 2 × controllable-reversible pitch propellers; 2 × rudders
- Speed: 32.5 knots (60 km/h; 37.4 mph)
- Complement: 30 officers and 300 enlisted
- Sensors & processing systems: AN/SPY-1A/B multi-function radar; AN/SPS-49 air search radar (Removed on some ships); AN/SPG-62 fire control radar; AN/SPS-73 surface search radar; AN/SPQ-9 gun fire control radar; AN/SQQ-89(V)1/3 - A(V)15 Sonar suite, consisting of: AN/SQS-53B/C/D active sonar; AN/SQR-19 TACTAS, AN/SQR-19B ITASS, & MFTA passive sonar; AN/SQQ-28 light airborne multi-purpose system
- Armament: 2 × Mk 26 missile launchers; 68 × RIM-66 SM-2; 20 × RUR-5 ASROC; 8 × RGM-84 Harpoon missiles; 2 × 5 in (127 mm)/54 caliber Mark 45 lightweight gun; 2–4 × .50 in (12.7 mm) cal. machine gun; 2 × Phalanx CIWS; 2 × Mk 32 12.75 in (324 mm) triple torpedo tubes
- Aircraft carried: 2 × MH-60R Seahawk LAMPS Mk III helicopters.

USS Valley Forge (CG-50) was a Ticonderoga-class cruiser in the United States Navy. She was named for Valley Forge, where the Continental Army camped during one winter in the American Revolution.

== Construction and commissioning ==
The ship was built by Ingalls Shipbuilding in Pascagoula, Mississippi, and was launched on 29 September 1984, by her sponsor Julia Vadala Taft, wife of Deputy Secretary of Defense William H. Taft IV.

== Service history ==
During the 1986 RIMPAC naval exercise, she acted as the plane guard for the aircraft carrier USS Ranger.

She saw action during Desert Storm in the USS Ranger battle group and served as the overall Anti-Air warfare commander for the gulf (Bravo Zulu AAWC).

In March 2003, Valley Forge was assigned to Destroyer Squadron 21.

The ship was decommissioned on 31 August 2004, at San Diego Naval Station, the first ship with the Aegis combat system withdrawn from service. Valley Forge was sunk on 2 November 2006, as part of target practice on a test range near Kauai, Hawaii.

=== Awards ===

- Combat Action Ribbon - (16-28 Feb 1991)
- Joint Meritorious Unit Award - (Dec 1992-May 1993)
- Navy Unit Commendation - (Jan-Feb 1991, Jan-May 2003)
- Navy Meritorious Unit Commendation - (Dec 1994-May 1995, Jun-Dec 1998)
- Navy E Ribbon - (1989, 1995, 1998)
- Navy Expeditionary Medal - (Jun-Jul 1987)
- Special Operations Service Ribbon - (Apr-May 1993)
