= VQ-5 =

Inactive US Navy aerial recon squadron

VQ-5 Sea Shadows
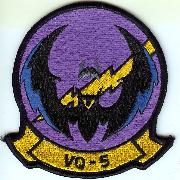
- Active: 15 August 1991 – 31 July 1999
- Country: United States
- Branch: United States Navy
- Type: Fleet Air Reconnaissance
- Garrison/HQ: NAS Agana (1991–1995), NAS North Island (1995–1999)
- Nickname: Seashadows
- Engagements: 1994 North Korean nuclear crisis Third Taiwan Strait Crisis Operation Desert Fox

Aircraft flown
- Electronic warfare: ES-3A Shadow

Fleet Air Reconnaissance Squadron 5 (VQ-5) was a former squadron of the U.S. Navy that was established on 15 August 1991. During its short-lived career, it was one of two squadrons assigned in the U.S. Navy to operate the ES-3A Shadow, which was a specialised version of the S-3 Viking used for over-horizon tracking and electronic intelligence.

== History ==
=== Early years ===
In 1991, with the retirement of the EA-3B Skywarrior after 40 years of flying the US Navy, the Navy prepared for the delivery of their new ES-3As. Before this, VQ-5 was established on 15 August of that year at NAS Agana, Guam, receiving their first 2 S-3A Vikings for pilot and crew training on 10 November 1991. On 8 May 1992, the first ES-3A was delivered to VQ-5, with ES-3A's VQ-5 Det. A, on board the USS Independence, becoming the first ES-3A unit to deploy on a carrier.

=== Detachments to carrier air wings ===
Starting in 1994, VQ-5 operated in detachments were deployed to numerous carrier air wings. As part of a 7th Fleet directive that year, it assigned a two-plane permanently attached detachment (VQ-5 Detachment 5) to Carrier Air Wing 5 based in Japan with the Independence. Unlike CVW-5 which was based at NAF Atsugi, VQ-5 Det. 5 was based in NAF Misawa. During that same year, they participated in operations in the Western Pacific during the tensions in the Korean Peninsula. VQ-5 also deployed to CVW-15 on board the Kitty Hawk during 1994 before their disestablishment in 1995.

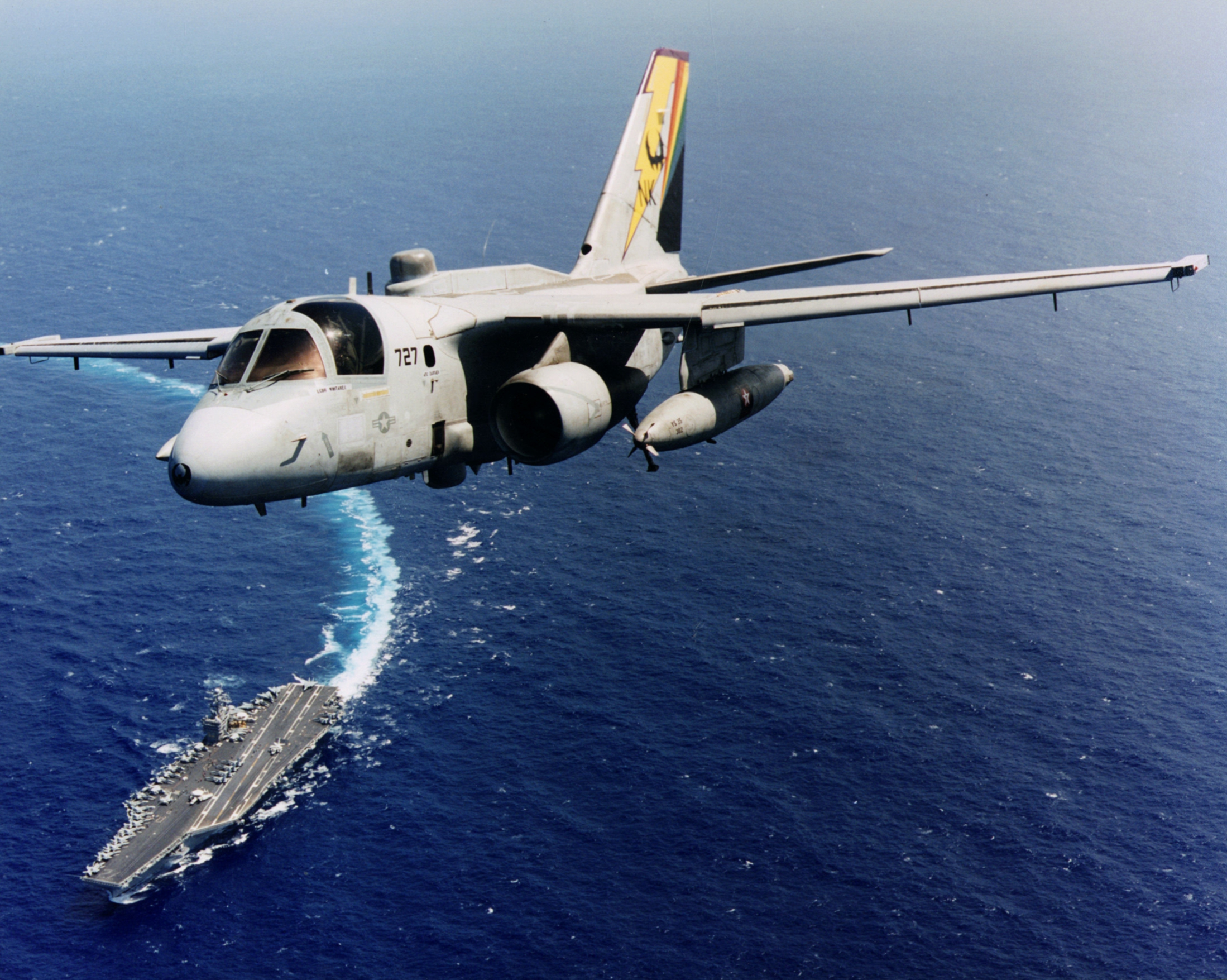
The C.A.G. bird of VQ-5 as part of CVW-14 over the Abraham Lincoln in 1998.

In 1995, with the impending closure of NAS Agana in Guam, the Sea Shadows moved to NAS North Island in San Diego. During the 1996 Taiwan Strait Crisis, VQ-5 was deployed on two carriers in the region, the USS Nimitz as well as the USS Independence. Other deployments to carriers in the following years included CVW-14 and CVW-11 on board the Carl Vinson, Nimitz as part of CVW-9, Abraham Lincoln with CVW-11 and CVW-14 and the Constellation with CVW-2.

=== Final cruise and retirement ===
In 1998, VQ-5 made their last cruise ever as Detachment C deployed with the Carl Vinson and CVW-11 during Operation Desert Fox before returning in May 1999. VQ-5 never deployed again and remained back in North Island. In June 1999, a ceremony was held for the decommissioning of the squadron although they were officially inactivated on 31 July 1999.
