= HSC-5 =

Helicopter Sea Combat Squadron 5 (HSC-5)
- HSC-5 Nightdippers Insignia
- Active: 3 January 1956 - present
- Country: United States
- Branch: United States Navy
- Type: Navy Helicopter Squadron
- Part of: CVW-7
- Garrison/HQ: NS Norfolk
- Nickname: "Nightdippers"
- Mottos: "We Rescue, We Protect, We Deliver"

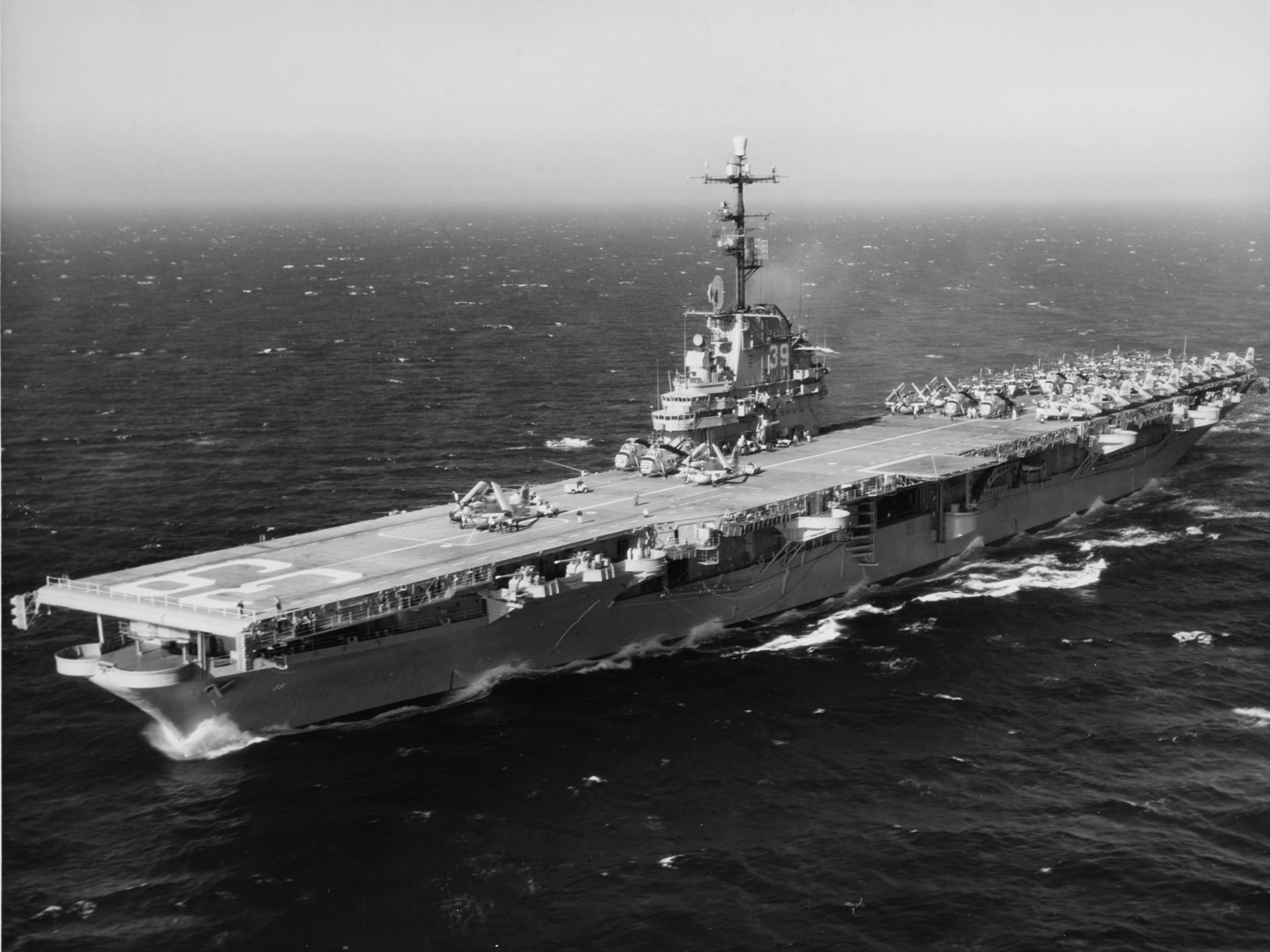
HSS Seabats from HS-5 on USS Lake Champlain, 1960.

Helicopter Sea Combat Squadron 5 (HSC-5) (previously Helicopter Anti-Submarine Squadron FIVE (HS-5)), also known as the Nightdippers, is a helicopter squadron of the United States Navy based at Naval Station Norfolk operating the Sikorsky MH-60S Seahawk. The Nightdippers are a part of Carrier Air Wing Seven and deploy aboard USS George H. W. Bush (CVN-77) to provide anti-surface warfare, search and rescue, vertical replenishment, Combat Search and Rescue and Naval Special Warfare Support capabilities to the carrier strike group.

== History ==
Helicopter Antisubmarine Squadron Five was established at Naval Air Station Key West, Florida, on 3 January 1956 flying the Sikorsky HSS-1N Seabat. Its primary mission was denying the enemy effective use of submarines. Assigned to Carrier Antisubmarine Air Group Fifty-Four in 1959, HS-5 moved to NAS Quonset Point, RI where the squadron completed several ASW deployments and participated in two Mercury spacecraft recoveries including America’s first astronaut, CDR Allen B. Shepard.

1960s

In 1962 the squadron's aircraft were re-designated to SH-34J Seabat in compliance with the 1962 United States Tri-Service aircraft designation system. In 1963, HS-5 transitioned to the Sikorsky SH-3A Sea King the first twin jet-turbine helicopter, and was assigned to Carrier Air Wing SEVEN (CVW-7) deploying aboard USS Independence (CV-62). By the end of the decade the Nightdippers had transitioned to the SH-3D Sea King.

1970s

In 1978, HS-5 and CVW-7 were assigned to USS Dwight D. Eisenhower (CVN-69), at the time the Navy's newest nuclear-powered aircraft carrier. Following an extended deployment to the Mediterranean Sea which ended in 1979, HS-5 transitioned to the SH-3H Sea King, which incorporated the latest in anti-submarine warfare (ASW) technological advances.

1980s

In 1986, an extended turnaround-training involved operations on four aircraft carriers: USS Coral Sea (CV-43), USS Saratoga (CV-60), USS Nimitz (CVN-68), and USS Theodore Roosevelt (CVN-71). Subsequently, An extensive work-up cycle prepared HS-5 and Eisenhower for a 1988 Mediterranean deployment. With a single helicopter embarked in USS Peterson (DD 969), the community had its first-ever six-month detachment of a single SH-3H for ASW. The venerable "Sea King" again proved its mettle during numerous multi-national exercises and sensitive Black Sea operations. Well-recognized for its outstanding performance in 1988, the squadron received its fourth Captain Arnold Jay Isbell Trophy, sixth CNO Safely Award, and a Meritorious Unit Commendation.

1990s

Following a successful turnaround cycle highlighted by two successive HSWING ONE Maintenance Trophies, HS-5 deployed to the Mediterranean Sea in March 1990, once again aboard Eisenhower. Referred to as the "Centennial Cruise" in honor of the 100th anniversary of the birth of President Dwight D. Eisenhower, this deployment included an unusual mid-deployment journey to the English Channel for participation in ceremonies in remembrance of the D-Day invasion of Normandy. In August 1990, IKE left the Mediterranean again, transiting the Suez Canal and taking position in the Red Sea to deter possible Iraqi aggression against Saudi Arabia at the beginning of Operation Desert Shield.

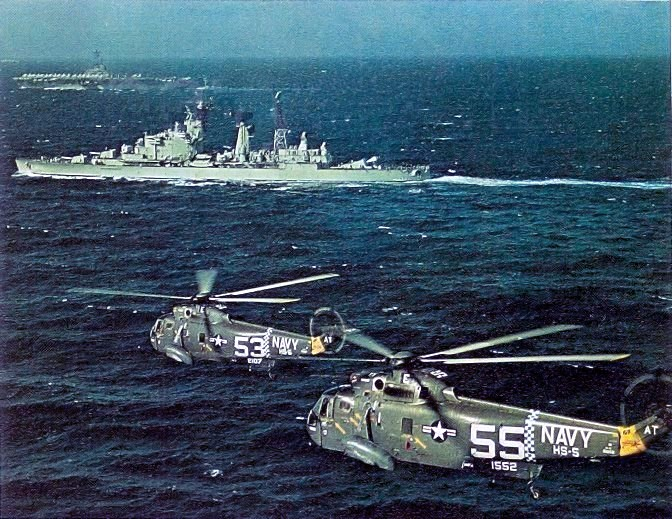
HS-5 SH-3As from USS Essex operating with HNLMS De Zeven Provinciën, in 1967

In July 1992, HS-5 and CVW-7 were assigned to USS George Washington (CVN-73) and transited through the Suez Canal to the Persian Gulf twice, first to participate in Operation SOUTHERN WATCH and again to counter Iraqi aggression near the Kuwaiti border in Operation VIGILANT WARRIOR. During the deployment, HS-5 surpassed 14 years and 44,000 hours of mishap-free flying.

The Nightdippers marked the end of an era when the last of their SH-3H Sea King helicopters was transferred from NAS Jacksonville in January 1995. Although the Sea Kings were older than the personnel maintaining them, several upgrades, modifications, and service life extensions had kept the H-3 up-to-date with the latest technological advances in ASW, electronics, and power plant systems. The squadron kept their vintage helicopters aloft for a total of 108,661 hours and in ready-to-launch, around-the-clock status for over three decades. The Sea Kings were flown to different parts of the country and one is displayed at the Quonset Point Air Museum in Rhode Island.

February 1995 began a new chapter in Nightdipper history when the squadron transitioned to the SH-60F and HH-60H Seahawk helicopters. Faced with completing a demanding transition during a compressed thirteen-month turnaround cycle, the men and women of HS-5 completed the transition three months ahead of schedule and met every operational commitment during their pre-deployment work-up schedule. Also at this time, HS-5 added yet another facet to their repertoire of warfare missions. While detached to NAS Fallon, Nevada, the Nightdippers perfected Combat Search and Rescue (CSAR) procedures in preparation for deployment. HS-5 rejoined Carrier Air Wing SEVEN in support of NATO's Operation DECISIVE ENDEAVOR.

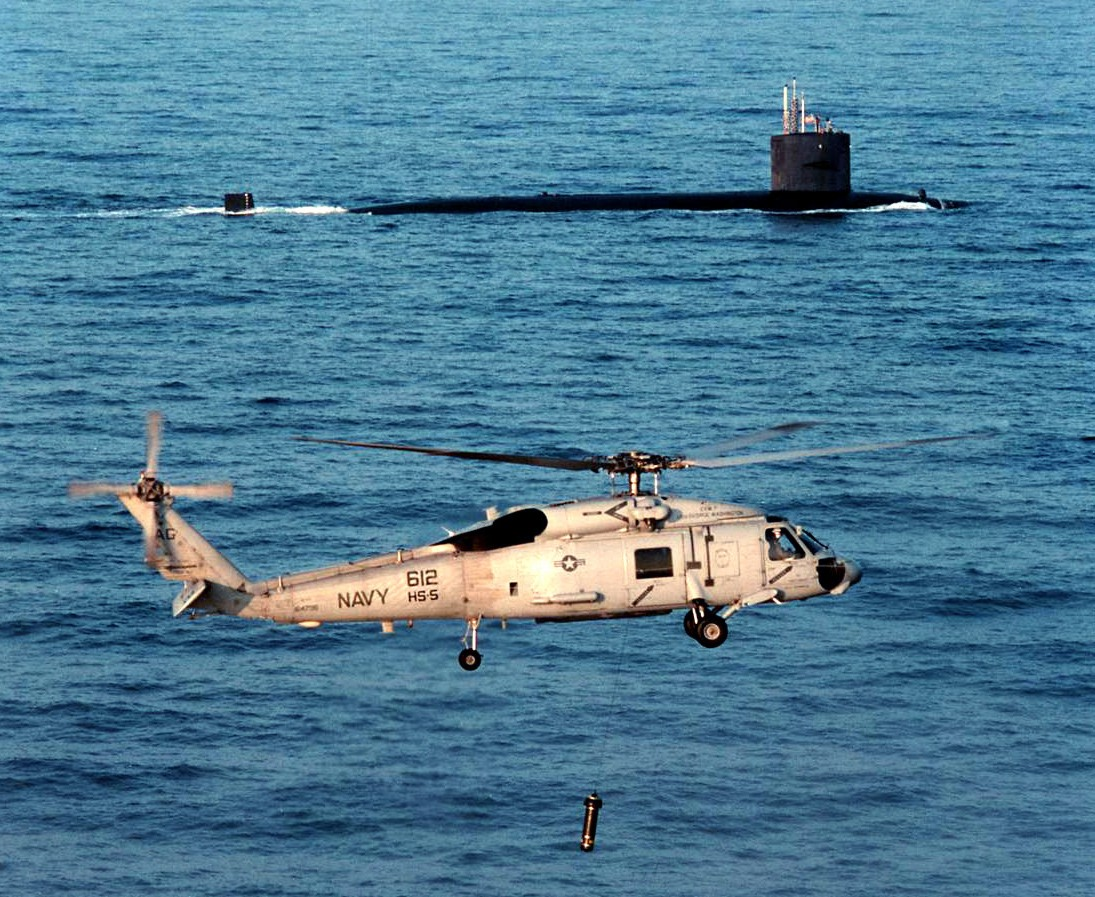
An SH-60F from HS-5 with USS Grayling, in 1996

21st Century

In 2002 HS-5 Joined the JFKBATGRU Joint Task Group 02-1 and CVW-7 in support of Operation ENDURING FREEDOM from February 2002 to August 2002. HS-5’s prowess and hard work was again rewarded as the year culminated with the squadron again being awarded both the Thach award as well as the Battle "E" for 2002. Following a well deserved, but short rest, the Nightdippers were back at it again in 2003 to prepare for an upcoming 2004 cruise. In August 2004, having switched carriers to the USS GEORGE WASHINGTON, CVW-7 and the Nightdippers went to Fallon, NV for a combined Airwing Detachment to kick-off the Interdeployment Readiness Cycle. Between then and December The NIGHTDIPPERS, with GW Strike Group, completed two at sea periods to wrap up the IDRC. After a Holiday break it was off to the Persian Gulf in support of Operation IRAQI FREEDOM. With new missions accomplished, a 99% sortie completion rate, over 70 Warfare Qualifiers, and establishing, once again, the Nightdippers as the premier helicopter squadron in the Navy it could be said that everyone did their parts plus a little more. Once back home the Nightdippers did not let up with the "press" by completing a Surge Sustainment at sea period and two Carrier Qualifications for Training Command and Fleet Replacement Squadrons. All the while maintaining a high level of combat readiness ‘til the end of the Surge Cycle in December 2004.

In 2005, HS-5 provided two aircraft and 37 personnel to participate in the massive Hurricane Katrina relief effort. The Nightdippers logged more than 93.6 flight hours, rescued 41 people in distress and delivered 14,860 pounds of food and water to hurricane victims. Also that summer approximately thirty maintainers, aircrew, and pilots were deployed for six months to an Expanded Maritime Interdiction Operation (EMIO) operating site. The Nightdippers effectively executed the Navy’s EMIO mission operating as part of the maritime component fighting the global war on terrorism by deterring, delaying, and disrupting the movement of terrorists and terrorist-related materials at sea. The Nightdippers operated with United States Marine Corps Fleet Anti-Terrorism Security Team (FAST) companies and Mobile Security Squadron Seven (MSS-7), as well as with forces from various allied nations.

From January to July 2009, HS-5 deployed in support of Operation ENDURING FREEDOM. Seven months later, HS-5 again deployed aboard Eisenhower and on the first night aboard launched the alert aircraft to conduct a long-range open ocean rescue in perilous weather conditions; the squadron also later recovered three survivors from an E-2C Hawkeye forced to ditch in the North Arabian Sea. In June 2012, HS-5 and CVW-7 deployed with Carrier Strike Group EIGHT (CSG-8) again aboard Eisenhower. Twelve days into the deployment, HS-5 successfully rescued a French Rafale pilot who ejected in the Mediterranean Sea and returned him to the French aircraft carrier, Charles de Gaulle. HS-5 returned home for two months before deploying again aboard Eisenhower until July 2013. Two months into that second deployment, HS-5 successfully rescued two American Naval Aviators who ejected from their F/A-18F in the Persian Gulf. While deployed the squadron’s homeport officially changed to NS Norfolk, VA in anticipation of the upcoming transition to the MH-60S Seahawk.

On 24 January 2014, Helicopter Antisubmarine Squadron Five (HS-5) completed its transition to the MH-60S and was re-designated Helicopter Sea Combat Squadron Five (HSC-5) during a ceremony at Naval Station Norfolk.

HSC-5 is currently attached to Carrier Air Wing SEVEN (CVW-7) and deploys onboard USS George H.W. Bush (CVN-77)

In January 2023, while the Bush carrier strike group was in the Mediterranean Sea, HSC-5 conducted training with the Albanian Armed Forces, using a range at Bizë in central Albania.

In late April 2026, HSC-5, as part of CVW 7 onboard the George H. W. Bush entered the CENTCOM AOR. HSC’s MH-60S began combat operations against Iran and undertook naval blockade sorties within Operation Epic Fury.

On 1 July 2026 3:30 AM EST, an MH-60S Seahawk of HSC-5 ditched in the Arabian Sea. Three of the four crewmembers aboard were safely rescued, but after approximately 4 days of continuous searching, the search for the 4th crewmember was terminated. On 7 July 2026, the missing Sailor was identified as the CO (commanding officer) of HSC-5, CDR Gabriel Edwards. Edwards was posthumously promoted to captain.

== Squadron Awards ==
Between 1992 and 2013, HS-5 received the Admiral Thach Award five times and the COMNAVAIRLANT Battle "E" in 1992, 1995, 2000, 2002, 2005-2010 and 2013. They also received the Isbell Trophy for ASW Excellence in 2006, 2011, and 2012.

== See also ==
- History of the United States Navy
- List of United States Navy aircraft squadrons
