= VS-35 (1990–2005) =

Sea Control Squadron 35
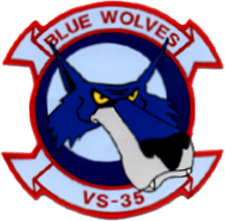
- VS-35 Insignia
- Active: 3 October 1990 – 31 March 2005
- Country: United States of America
- Branch: United States Navy
- Role: In-flight refueling Anti-surface warfare
- Homeport: NAS North Island
- Nickname: "Blue Wolves"
- Aircraft: Lockheed S-3A/B Viking

VS-35, Sea Control Squadron 35, known as the Blue Wolves was a carrier-based United States Navy squadron based out of Naval Air Station North Island in California. The squadron flew the Lockheed S-3B Viking and their mission was mining, undersea and surface warfare, electronic reconnaissance and analysis, over the horizon targeting, and aerial refueling. The squadron was last attached to Carrier Air Wing Fourteen (CVW-14). VS-35 was deactivated in a ceremony at NAS North Island on 24 March 2005, and officially on 31 March 2005.

== History ==
=== Previous VS-35 squadrons ===
The squadron was the fourth squadron to be designated as VS-35. The first VS-35 was established on 3 January 1961 and disestablished on 30 June 1973. In October 1976, preparations were made to reestablish VS-35 to fly the new turbine-powered S-3A, but fiscal constraints prevented completion of this plan and the second VS-35 was disestablished on 30 March 1977. On 10 September 1986, a pre-establishment detachment was set up and the third VS-35 were officially established on 3 March 1987, they were assigned to the newly created CVW-10, after one brief sea period on board the USS Enterprise, VS-35 was disestablished for the third time on 1 June 1988 and fiscal constraints led to the disestablishment of CVW-10 on 30 September 1988.

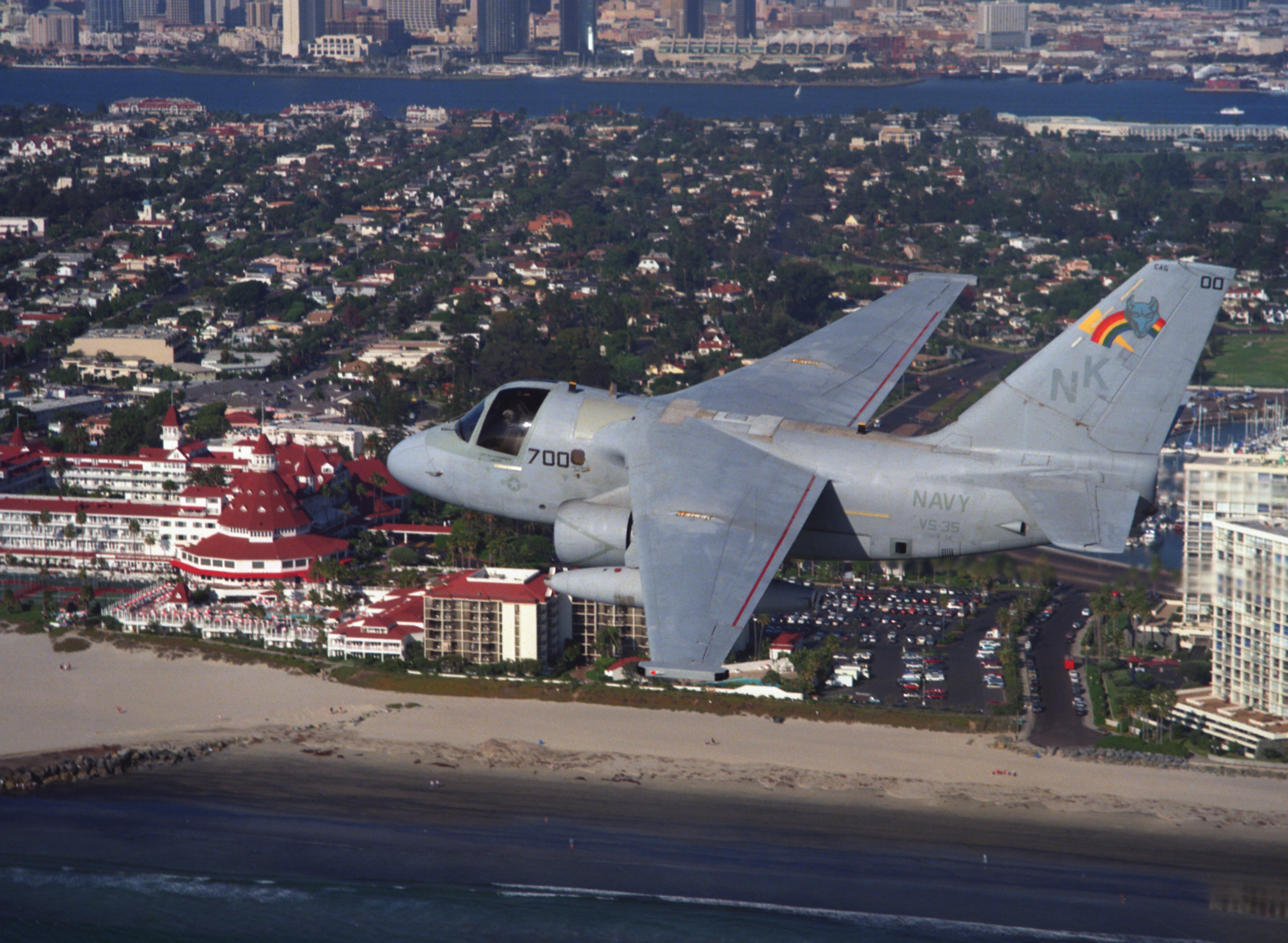
NK-700, an S-3B Viking assigned to VS-35 off the coast of Coronado, CA on 23 January 1995. Note, that the CAG bird colors are from 1994.

=== Last VS-35's early years (1990-1996) ===
The fourth VS-35 began its existence on 3 October 1990, as a pre-establishment detachment with the official establishment on 4 April 1991. The fourth VS-35 adopted the nickname "Blue Wolves", flew the S-3A, and were assigned to CVW-14 on board USS Carl Vinson on 10 October 1991. The Blue Wolves transitioned to the S-3B in December 1992.

For the first time since 1972, the Blue Wolves deployed to sea on 17 February 1994, on board USS Carl Vinson to the western Pacific in support of Operation Southern Watch. During the deployment, the squadron was featured in the 1995 Discovery Channel documentary Carrier: Fortress at Sea. In 1996, the squadron deployed again on board Carl Vinson and in support of Operation Southern Watch.

=== Abraham Lincoln years (1997-2003) ===
In June 1998, Carrier Air Wing Fourteen was reattached to USS Abraham Lincoln and deployed in June 1998 to the Persian Gulf in support of Operation Southern Watch and again in 2000.

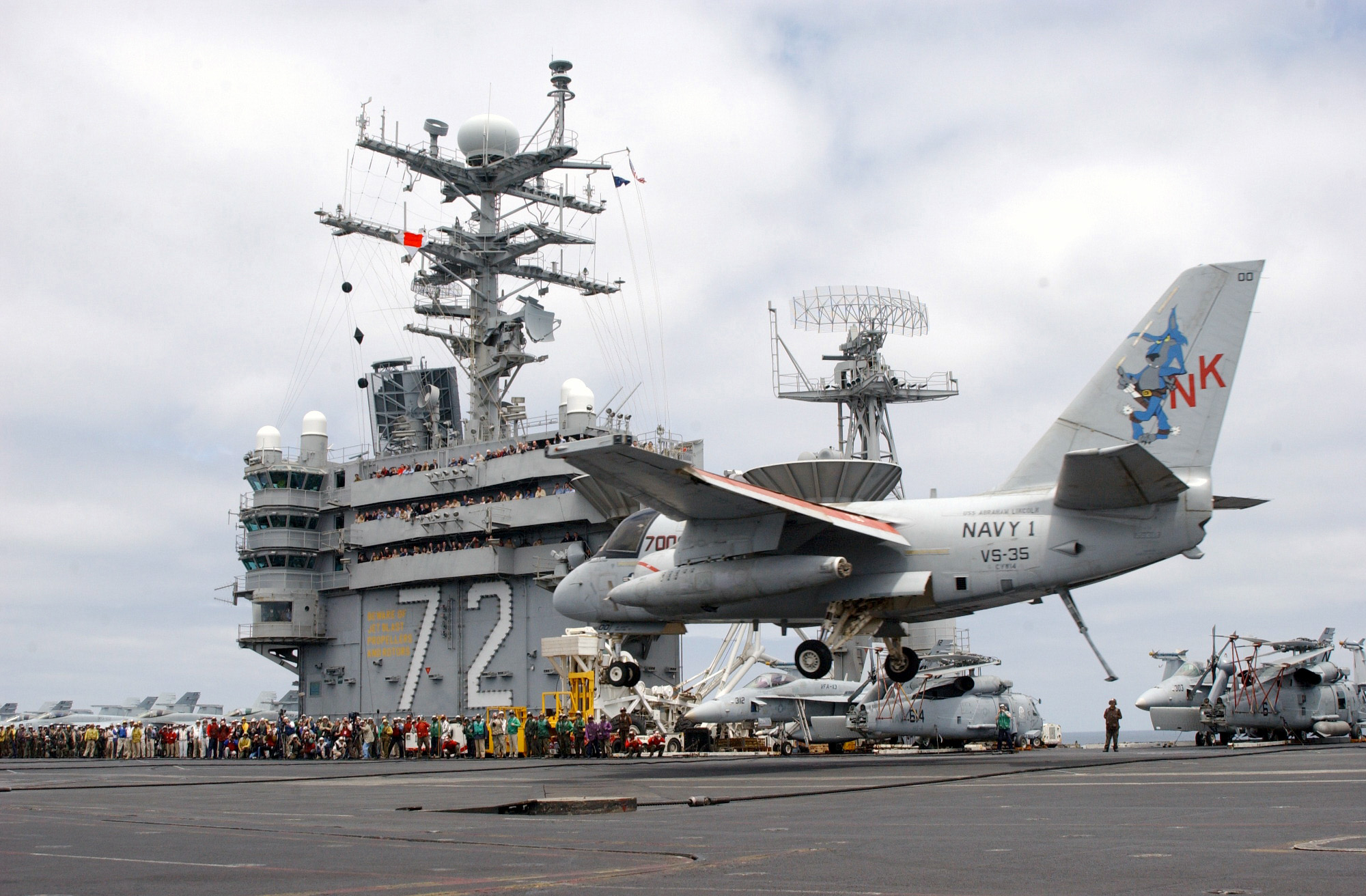
VS-35 Navy One lands on USS Abraham Lincoln on 1 May 2003

In July 2002, the squadron deployed on board USS Abraham Lincoln in support of Operation Enduring Freedom and Southern Watch. After an overall period in Perth, Australia, for Abraham Lincoln, the Blue Wolves returned to the Persian Gulf to commence combat operations in support of Operation Iraqi Freedom.

The squadron returned home on 2 May 2003, after nearly ten months away, the longest for a United States aircraft carrier since the Vietnam War.

Upon returning from Operation Iraqi Freedom, on 1 May 2003, the squadron flew President George W. Bush on board USS Abraham Lincoln for his "Mission Accomplished" speech. The Blue Wolves have the distinction of being the only Navy squadron with the designator Navy One.

=== Final Years (2004-2005) ===
In May 2004, VS-35 departed for their final deployment on board USS John C. Stennis. During a naval exercise on 10 August 2004, one of their S-3B Viking aircraft crashed into North Iwo Jima, an uninhabited island, killing the four members on board. Upon returning in October 2004, the squadron began preparations for deactivation. Official deactivation occurred on 31 March 2005.

== Mission ==
Over land employ the LANTIRN Targeting System to localize enemies and track them until given the authority to kill them. Use laser guided maverick missiles or buddy laze in order for others to use laser guided weapons on enemies. Pass precise coordinates to allied forces on the ground or in the air to deliver precision guided munitions to bear. Over the sea, use Automated Information System, Data Link, ESM, Radar, ISAR, NVDs, and Infrared systems to find ships. Pass their position to surface ships who will board and detain the enemy. Overhead the ship, use refueling stores. The maintenance team will get the Vikings airborne and the aircrew will put the jets in position for expeditious rendezvous in the tanker pattern.

== See also ==
- History of the United States Navy
- List of inactive United States Navy aircraft squadrons
- List of United States Navy aircraft squadrons
