= Navy One =

US Navy aircraft carrying the US president

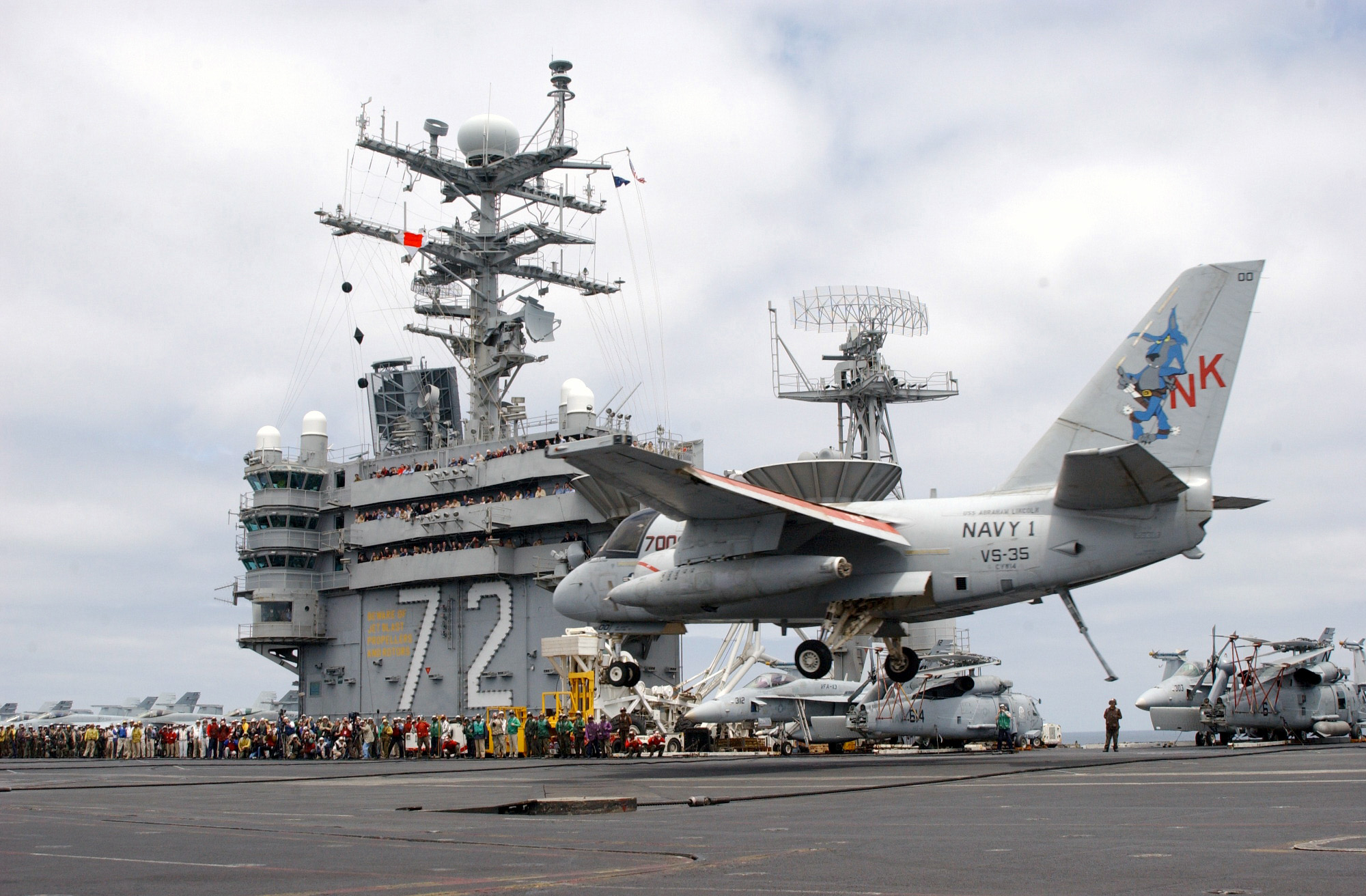
- Navy One landing on the USS Abraham Lincoln with President George W. Bush

General information
- Type: S-3 Viking
- Manufacturer: Lockheed
- Serial: BuNo 159387

History
- Preserved at: National Naval Aviation Museum

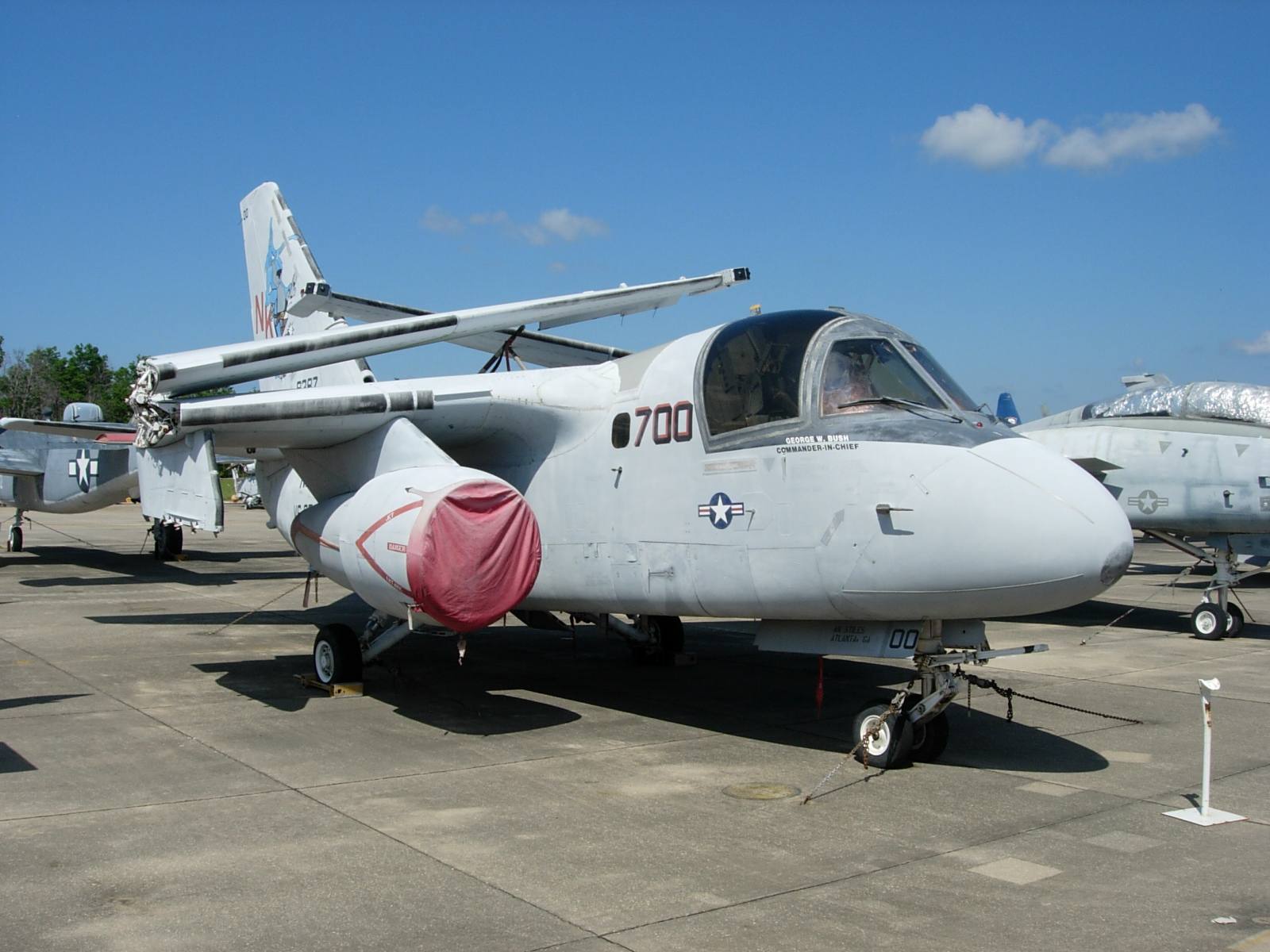
S-3B Viking "Navy One" at the National Naval Aviation Museum.

Navy One is the call sign of any United States Navy aircraft carrying the president of the United States.

There has only been one aircraft designated as Navy One: a Lockheed S-3 Viking, BuNo 159387, assigned to the "Blue Wolves" of VS-35, which transported President George W. Bush to the aircraft carrier USS Abraham Lincoln off the coast of San Diego, California, on 1 May 2003. The pilot was Commander John "Skip" Lussier, then VS-35's executive officer; and the flight officer was Lieutenant Ryan "Wilson" Phillips. The S-3 used for the flight was retired from service and placed on display at the National Naval Aviation Museum in Pensacola, Florida, on 17 July 2003.

A Navy aircraft carrying the vice president would be designated Navy Two.

== See also ==
- Transportation of the president of the United States
- 2003 Mission Accomplished speech
