= Carrier Air Wing Ten =

Carrier Air Wing 10
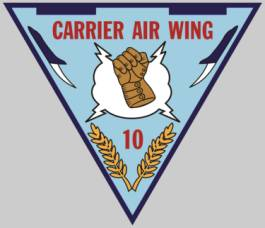
- Active: 1 May 1950 – 20 November 1969 (first CVW-10); 1 November 1986 – 30 September 1988 (second CVW-10)
- Country: United States
- Branch: United States Navy
- Type: Carrier air wing
- Engagements: Vietnam War; Cold War

Carrier Air Wing Ten (CVW-10) were two separate carrier air wings of the United States Navy that existed during the Cold War. The first CVW-10 was originally known as CVG-10 and was established in 1950 before being disestablished in November 1969. The second and much shorter lived one was established in 1986 but due to budgets after one workups cruise, it was disestablished in 1988 along with all of its squadrons.

== History ==
=== Early years (1950–1964) ===
Carrier Air Group 10 was established on 1 May 1950, but did not see a deployment until 1952 on board the USS Lake Champlain. Although CVG-10 didn't take part in the Korean War, it still did see more deployments in years to come, taking part in nine more deployments before the decade's end, including on board the U.S. Navy's first super carrier, the USS Forrestal during the Lebanon crisis in 1958 before moving to the smaller Essex in mid-1959. As part of the Navy-wide renaming scheme, CVG-10 became Carrier Air Wing 10 on 20 December 1963. During that time, the air group was still on deployment on the USS Shangri-La and returned home from the Mediterranean under the new name.

=== Vietnam and end of first CVW-10 (1965–1969) ===
CVW-10 made another deployment on Shangri-La in 1965 as well as minor deployment on board USS Intrepid (CVS-11) in early 1966 before in April being deployed to the Gulf of Tonkin on board Intrepid again to take part in the Vietnam War. After leaving in November of that year, CVW-10 returned to Vietnam two more times in 1967 and 1968 before returning in February 1969 before being decommissioned on 29 November.

First Carrier Air Wing Ten (1968 to 1969 Vietnam Cruise)
Cruise Date	Carrier	Squadron	Aircraft
4 June 1968 – 8 February 1969	USS Intrepid CVS-11	VF-111 Sundowners Detachment 11	F-8C Crusader
4 June 1968 – 8 February 1969	USS Intrepid CVS-11	VA-36 Roadrunners	A-4C Skyhawk
4 June 1968 – 8 February 1969	USS Intrepid CVS-11	VA-66 Waldos	A-4C Skyhawk
4 June 1968 – 8 February 1969	USS Intrepid CVS-11	VA-106 Gladiators	A-4E Skyhawk
4 June 1968 – 8 February 1969	USS Intrepid CVS-11	VFP-63 Eyes of the Fleet Detachment 11	RF-8G Crusader
4 June 1968 – 8 February 1969	USS Intrepid CVS-11	VAQ-33 Nigh Hawks Detachment 11	EA-1F Skyraider
4 June 1968 – 8 February 1969	USS Intrepid CVS-11	VAW-121 Griffins Detachment 11	E-1B Tracer
4 June 1968 – 8 February 1969	USS Intrepid CVS-11	HC-2 Fleet Angels Detachment 11	UH-2B Seasprite

=== Second CVW-10 (1986–1988) ===
As part of Ronald Reagan's plan to build a 600-ship Navy, CVW-13 and CVW-10 were reestablished in the 1980s, with CVW-10 becoming a west coast CVW on 1 November 1986 (CVW-13 took the old tail code of CVW-10 which was AK). Originally VFA-195 flying the F/A-18A Hornet was to join CVW-10 as the VFA (Strike Fighter) squadron based on images with VFA-195 with the NM tail code in 1986. VFA-161 and VFA-195 would, however, switch places at NAS Fallon with photographic evidence showing both squadrons at there. VFA-161 was later removed from CVW-5 and would not return to Japan after transition training was completed on Hornet and would be placed in to inactive status joining CVW-10 while VFA-195 went to NAF Atusgi to join CVW-5.

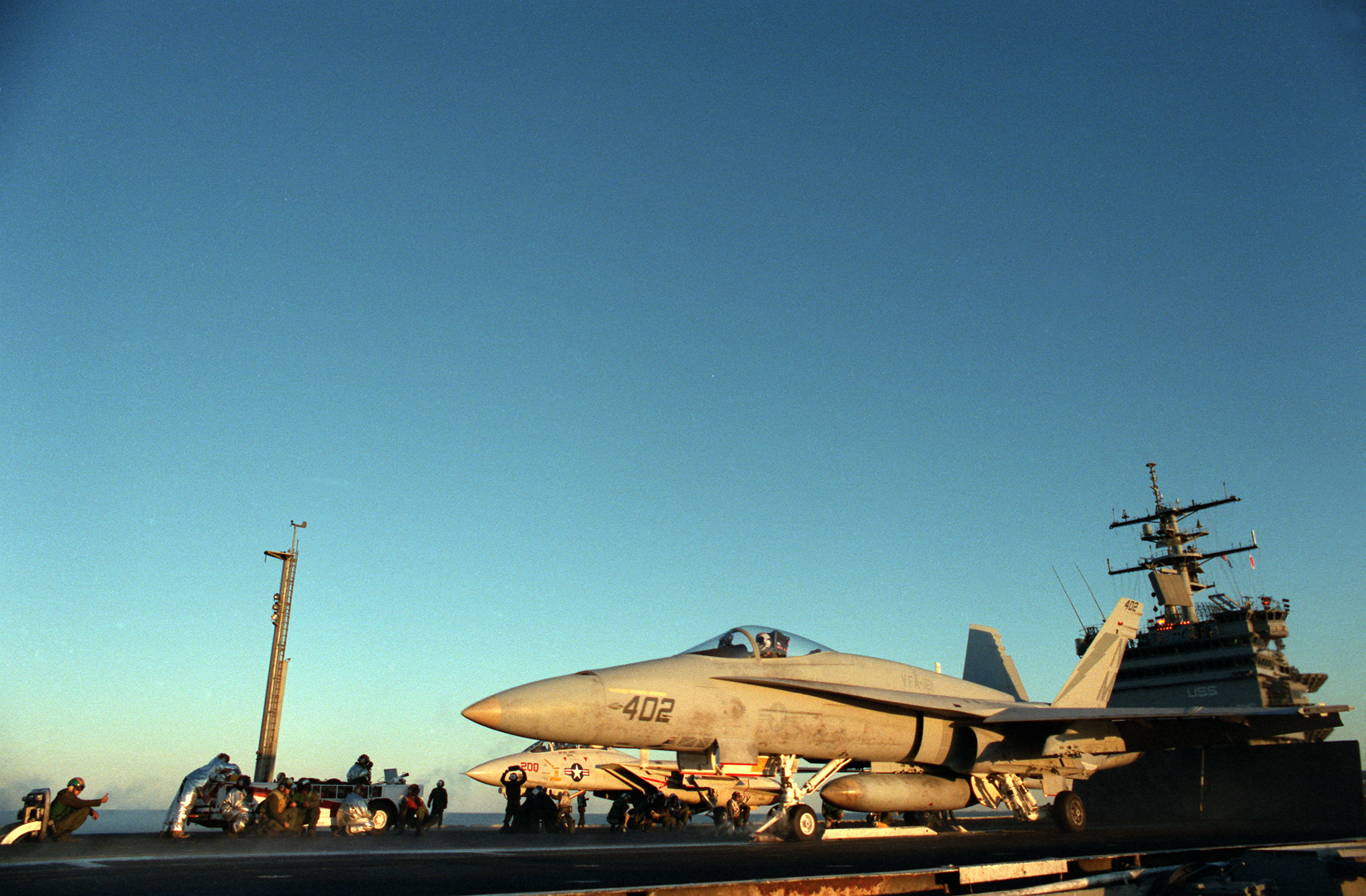
An F/A-18A Hornet of VFA-161 prepares to launch from USS Enterprise while an F-14A waits behind. CVW-10 was on board Enterprise in 1987.

After not deploying with USS Independence as planned in 1986, CVW-10 deployed aboard USS Enterprise CVN-65 from 24 July – 5 August 1987, in the East Pacific. After, this due to the warming relations between the Soviet Union and the United States as well as budget cuts, CVW-10 was decommissioned for the final time on 30 September 1988. All of CVW-10's squadrons also were decommissioned including VS-35, which would be reestablished again for the fourth time in the 1990 under a new nickname.

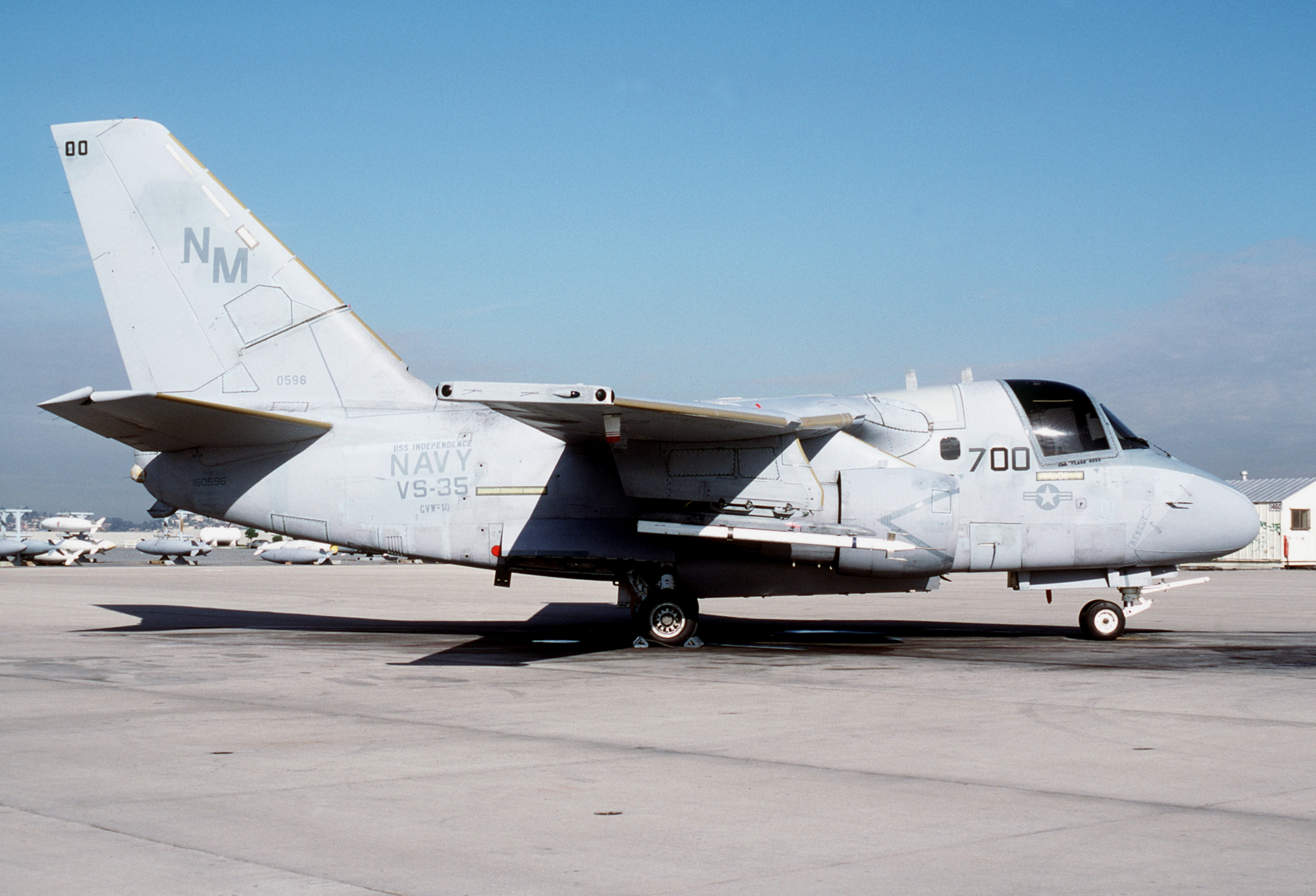
VS-35's C.A.G. S-3A Viking as part of CVW-10 in 1986. VS-35 would be reestablished again in 1990.

Final Carrier Air Wing Ten (1988)
Carriers	Squadrons	Aircraft	Decommissioned
USS Independence (CV-62) (Planned, not deployed) USS Enterprise CVN-65 (Deployed)	VF-191 Satan's Kitties	F-14A Tomcat	30 April 1988
USS Independence (CV-62) (Planned, not deployed) USS Enterprise CVN-65 (Deployed)	VF-194 Hellfires	F-14A Tomcat	30 April 1988
USS Independence (CV-62) (Planned, not deployed) USS Enterprise CVN-65 (Deployed)	VFA-161 Chargers	F/A-18A Hornet	1 April 1988
USS Independence (CV-62) (Planned, not deployed) USS Enterprise CVN-65 (Deployed)	VS-35 Boomerangs	S-3A Viking	1 June 1988
USS Independence (CV-62) (Planned, not deployed) USS Enterprise CVN-65 (Deployed)	VAW-111 Grey Berets	E-2C Hawkeye	30 April 1988
USS Independence (CV-62) (Planned, not deployed) USS Enterprise CVN-65 (Deployed)	HS-16 Nighthawks	SH-3H Sea King	1 June 1988
