= VFA-161 =

Strike Fighter Squadron 161
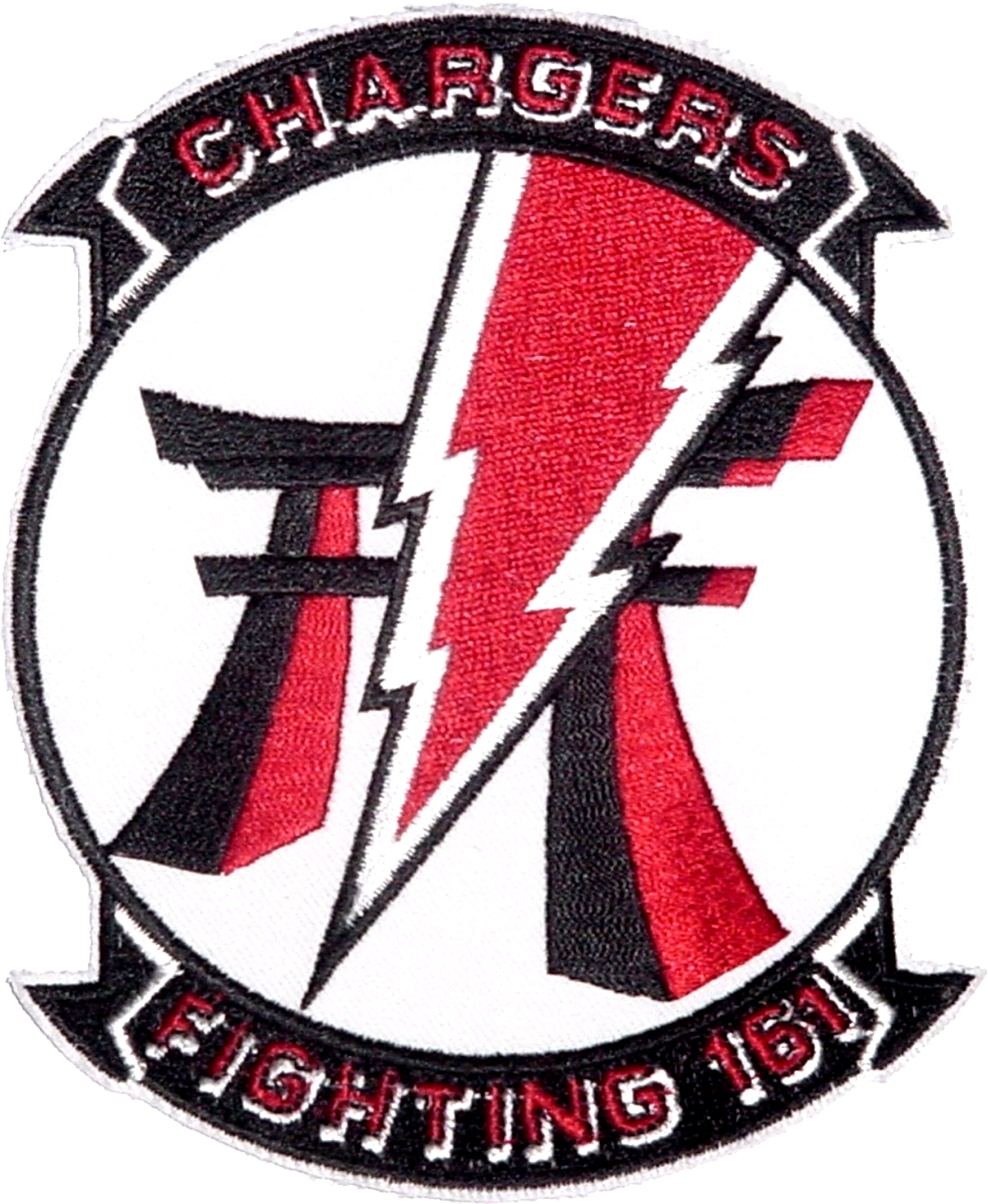
- VFA-161 squadron insignia
- Active: 1 September 1960-1 April 1988
- Country: United States
- Branch: United States Navy
- Role: Strike Fighter
- Part of: Inactive
- Nickname: Chargers

Aircraft flown
- Fighter: F3H Demon; F-4B/N/J/S Phantom; F/A-18A Hornet

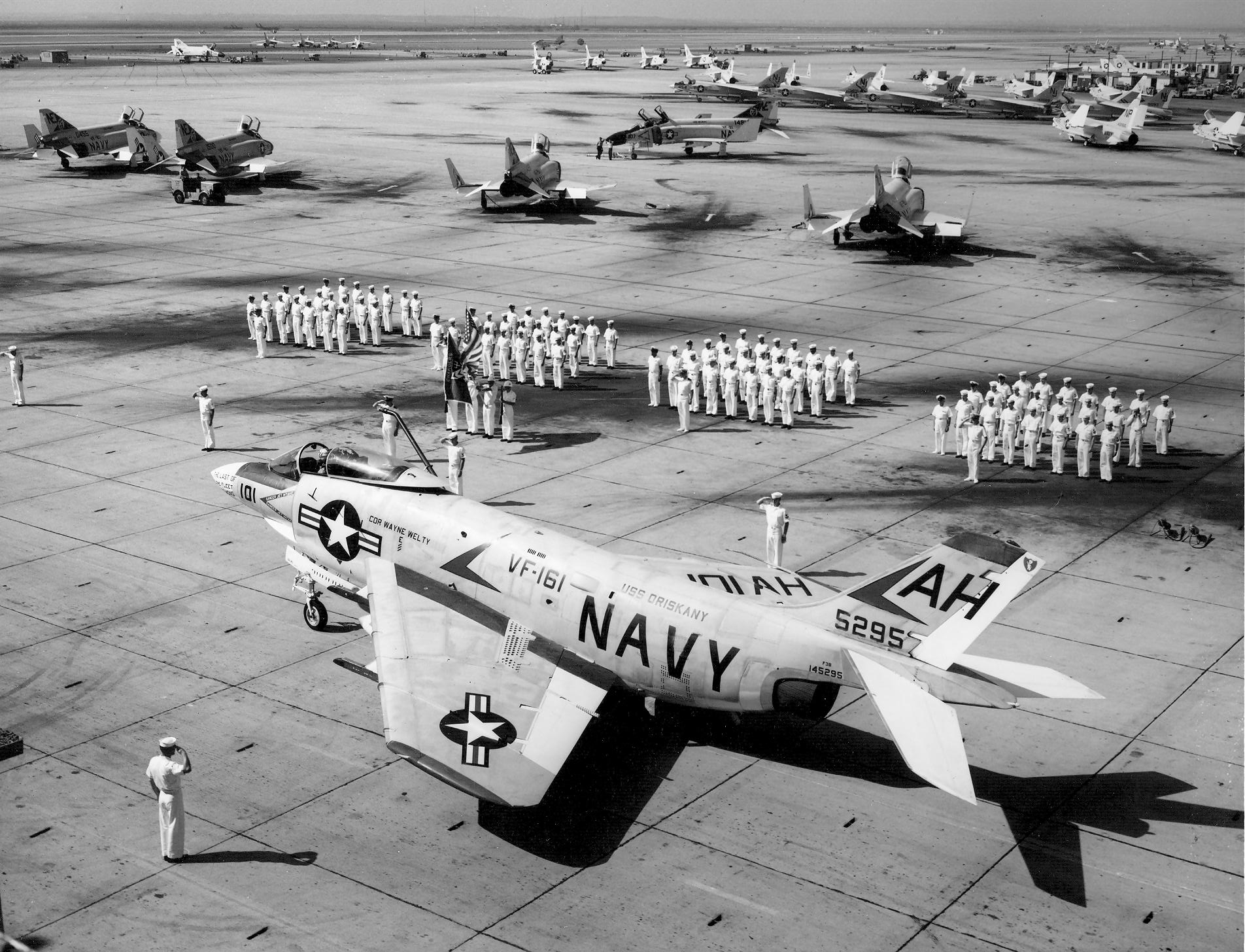
Retirement of the last F3H Demon at NAS Miramar in September 1964

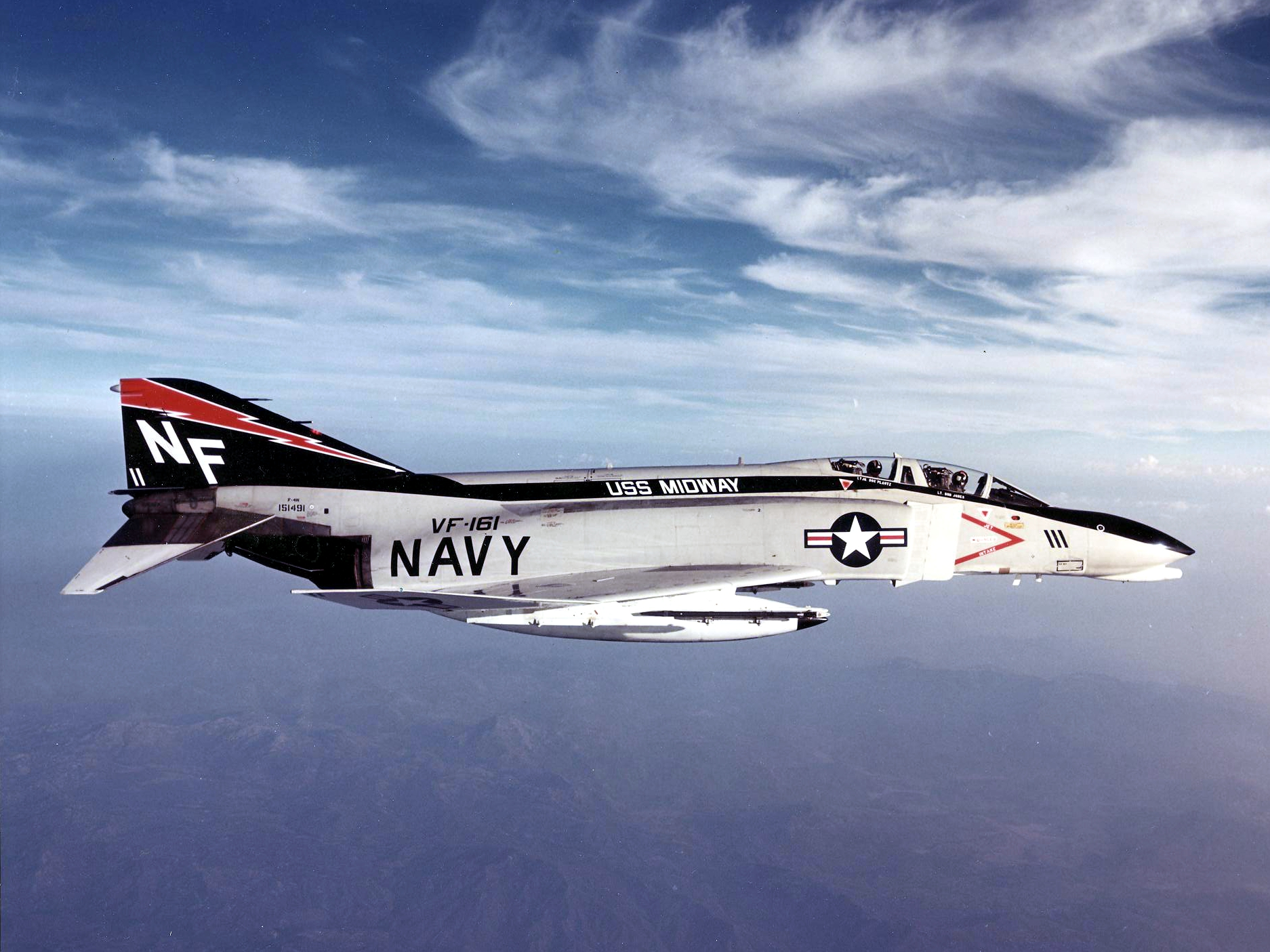
VF-161 F-4N c.1975

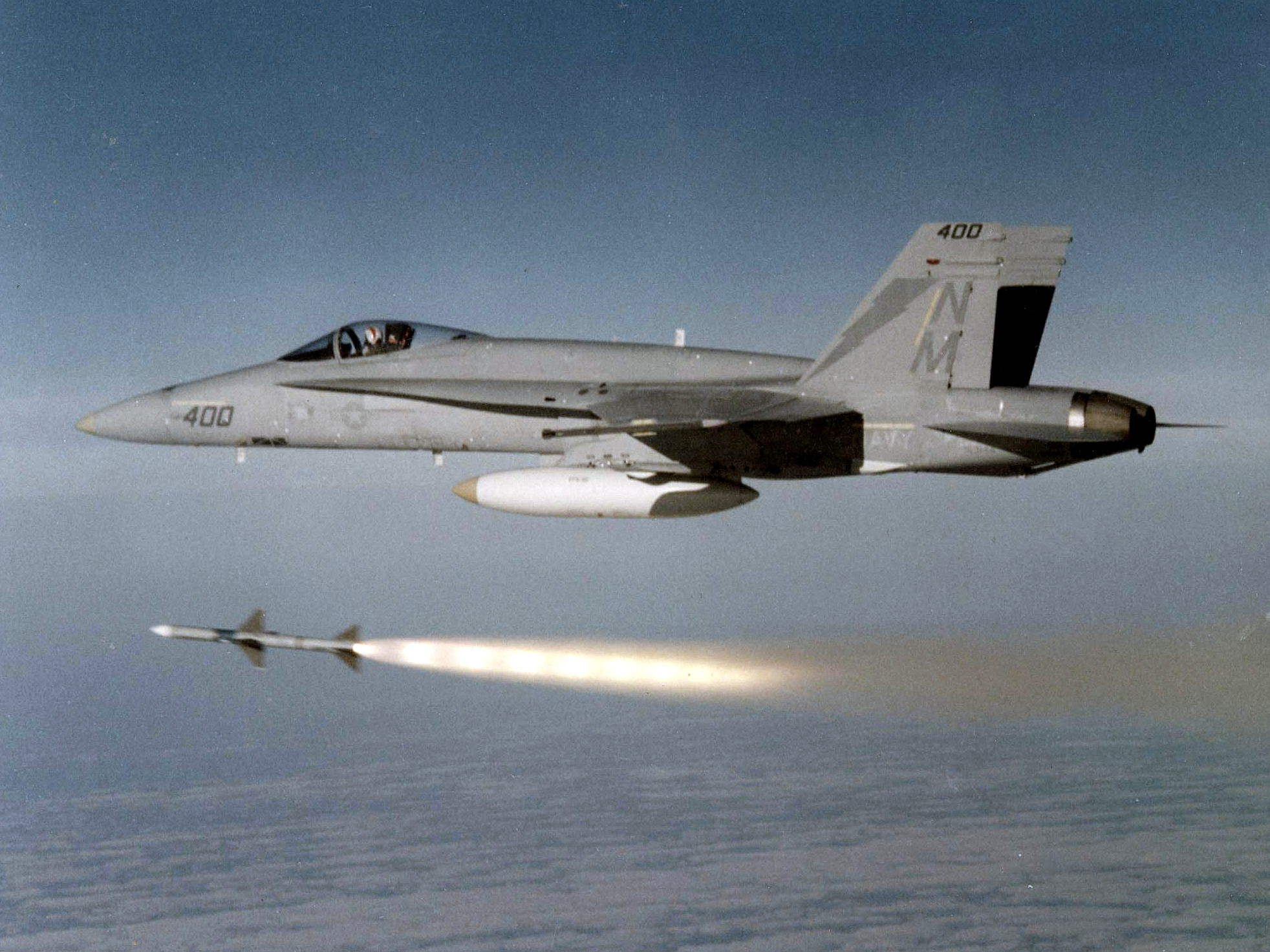
VFA-161 F/A-18A launches an AIM-7 Sparrow missile in 1987

VFA-161, nicknamed the Chargers, was a Strike Fighter Squadron of the U.S. Navy. It was established at NAS Cecil Field as Fighter Squadron VF-161 on 1 September 1960. It moved to NAS Miramar on 19 September 1961, and to Naval Station Yokosuka, Japan. On 1 April 1986, the squadron was redesignated VFA-161. It was disestablished on 1 April 1988.

== Operational history ==
=== Vietnam War ===
The squadron made 9 deployments during the Vietnam War.

From 1 August 1963 to 10 March 1964, VF-161 equipped with F-3Bs was embarked on USS Oriskany.

From 12 May to 3 December 1966, VF-161 equipped with F-4Bs was embarked on USS Constellation with Carrier Air Wing 15. On 13 July, four of the squadron's aircraft engaged six of the Vietnam People's Air Force (VPAF) MiG-17. Using a Sidewinder missile, LT William 'Squeaky' McGuigan and LT (jg) Robert Fowler shot down one of the MiG-17s.

On 22 October F-4B #151009 was hit by antiaircraft fire, the pilot LTCDR Earl McBride was killed in action body not recovered; the radar intercept officer ejected successfully and was rescued.

From 29 July 1967 to 6 April 1968, VF-161 was deployed on USS Coral Sea. On 28 December F-4B #150449 was hit by antiaircraft fire near Haiphong both crewmen ejected successfully and were rescued. In March USS Coral Sea left Yankee Station to operate off the coast of Korea following the capture of USS Pueblo.

From 7 September 1968 to 18 April 1969, VF-161 was deployed on USS Coral Sea.

From 23 September 1969 to 1 July 1970, VF-161 was deployed on USS Coral Sea. On 25 February F-4B #152286 was lost due to fuel exhaustion, both crewmen ejected successfully and were rescued. On 17 May F-4B #152239 crashed on launch the pilot Lt Norman Westwood was killed in action, body not recovered while the radar intercept officer ejected successfully and was rescued.

From 16 April to 6 November 1971, VF-161 was deployed on USS Midway.

From 10 April 1972 to 3 March 1973, VF-161 was deployed on USS Midway. From May to October 1972, the squadron participated in air strikes against targets in North Vietnam to interdict the flow of supplies and to reduce North Vietnam's ability to continue the war effort in South Vietnam. On 18 May squadron aircraft shot down two VPAF MiG-19s, a further two MiG-17s were shot down on 23 May. On 12 January 1973, squadron aviators shot down another MiG-17, this was the last MiG to be shot down during the Vietnam War.

From 11 September to 31 December 1973, VF-161 equipped with F-4Ns was deployed on USS Midway. From this deployment USS Midway and Carrier Air Wing Five were permanently homeported in Yokosuka.

In April and May 1975, squadron aircraft provided air cover for Operation Frequent Wind, the evacuation of American personnel from Saigon, South Vietnam, as the country fell to the communists.

=== 1970s ===
In August 1976, embarked on USS Midway, the squadron conducted flight operations near the Korean Peninsula following the Axe murder incident. In 1979, USS Midway, with VF-161 embarked, deployed to the Gulf of Aden to relieve USS Constellation and maintain a U.S. carrier presence following the outbreak of fighting between North and South Yemen and the fall of the Shah of Iran. Following the Iranian seizure of the American Embassy in Teheran and the taking of American hostages on 4 November 1979, USS Midway, with VF-161 embarked, proceeded to the Gulf of Oman and remained on station until relieved in early February 1980.

=== 1980s ===
From May–June 1980, USS Midway, with VF-161 embarked, operated off the coast of Korea due to the civil unrest in South Korea and the Kwangju massacre. In December 1981 due to tensions in Korea the squadron operated from USS Midway off the coast of Korea until the tensions subsided.

On 4 June 1983 LTjg Steve Martone's F-4S struck the ramp of the USS Midway on WESTPAC cruise. The RIO ejected and survived (source needed) but LTjg Martone was killed.

From May to October 1986, the squadron relocated to NAS Lemoore for transition training in the F/A-18A Hornet and redesignation as a Strike Fighter Squadron. VF-161 was one of only two F-4 fighter squadrons to be assigned the VFA designation.

From October 1986 to June 1987, following the transfer of the squadron from CVW-5 and awaiting transfer to a newly established air wing, the squadron was in an inactive status at NAS Lemoore. The squadron was then briefly assigned to the newly re-established Carrier Air Wing Ten (CVW-10, Tailcode NM). VFA-161 conducted work-ups on USS Enterprise and was scheduled to deploy on board USS Independence. Following budget cuts, CVW-10 was disestablished. VFA-161 was disestablished on 1 April 1988.

== Aircraft assigned ==
The squadron operated the following aircraft, with the dates received as shown:

- McDonnell F3H Demon (1960)
- McDonnell Douglas F-4 Phantom II variants F-4B (1964), F-4N (1973), F-4J (1977), and F-4S (1981)
- McDonnell Douglas F/A-18A Hornet (1986).

== See also ==
- History of the United States Navy
- List of inactive United States Navy aircraft squadrons
