= VS-35 (1986–1988) =

Air Anti-Submarine Squadron 35
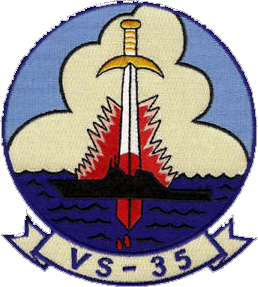
- Active: 10 September 1986 – 1 June 1988
- Country: United States of America
- Branch: United States Navy
- Role: Anti-Submarine Warfare
- Nickname(s): "Boomerangers"
- Equipment: S-3A Viking
- Engagements: Cold War

Air Anti-Submarine Squadron 35 known as the Boomerangs was reestablished in 1986 as the Anti-Submarine Warfare squadron of CVW-10 which was also created that same year. During its short active service, it flew the Lockheed S-3A Viking before CVW-10 along with it were disestablished in 1988.

== History ==
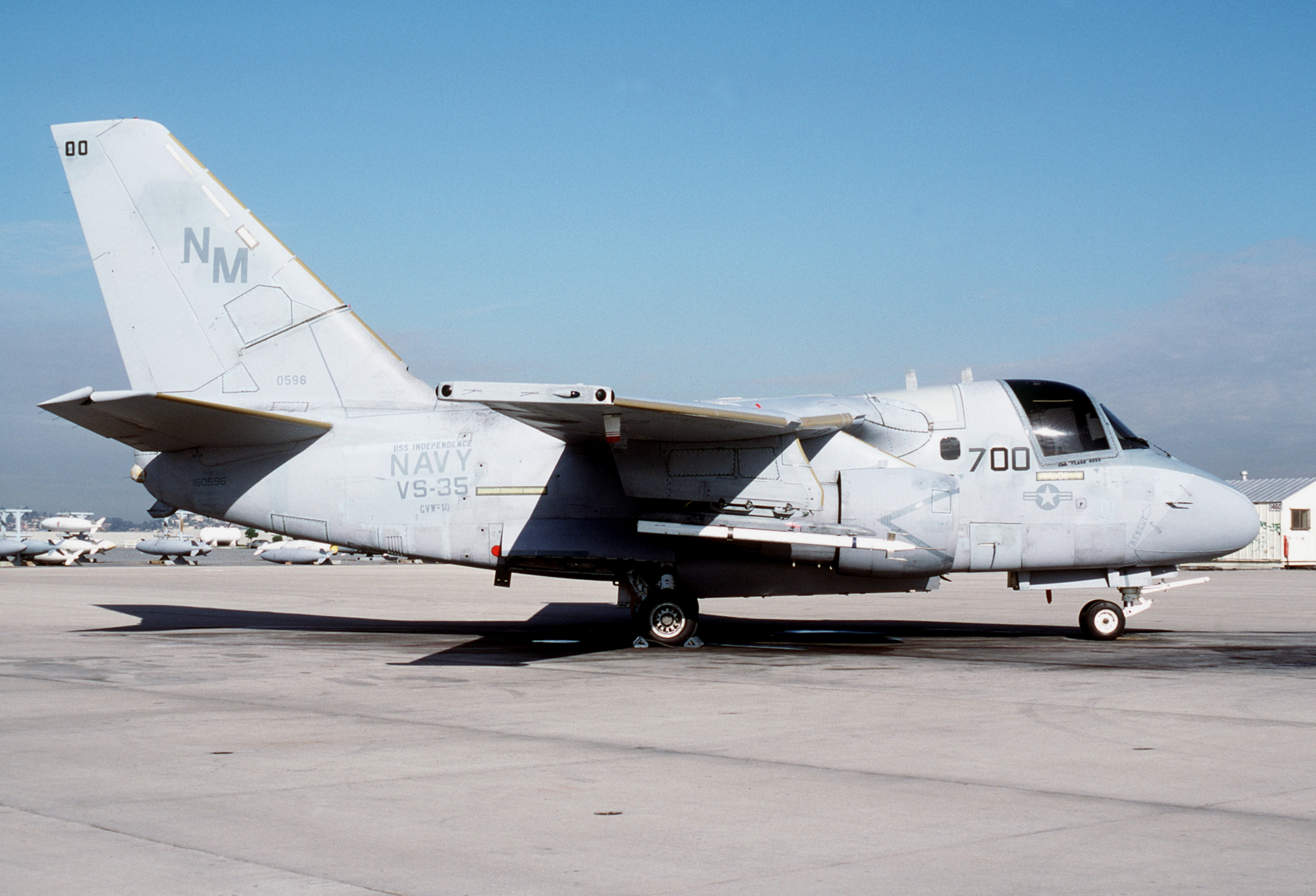
An S-3A Viking of VS-35 at NAS North Island in 1986.

VS-35 was reestablished as a pre-establishment detachment on 10 September 1986. During this time, VS-35 was soon assigned to CVW-10 and given the tail code "NM". VS-35 was originally supposed to deploy with USS Independence in 1986 but did this not happen. Between 24 July 1987, to 5 August 1987, VS-35 deployed onboard USS Enterprise along the west coast. After this deployment, it was still planned that CVW-10 would deploy with Independence, but by the time Independence completed her SLEP-life upgrade, VS-35 was decommissioned on 1 June 1988. According to a U.S. Navy document, VS-35 was only equipped with 7 S-3A Vikings compared to other VS squadrons which had 9 to 11 aircraft.

VS-35 would be reestablished again in 1990 under the new name "Blue Wolves".
