= Carrier air wing =

Group of aircraft units operating from an aircraft carrier

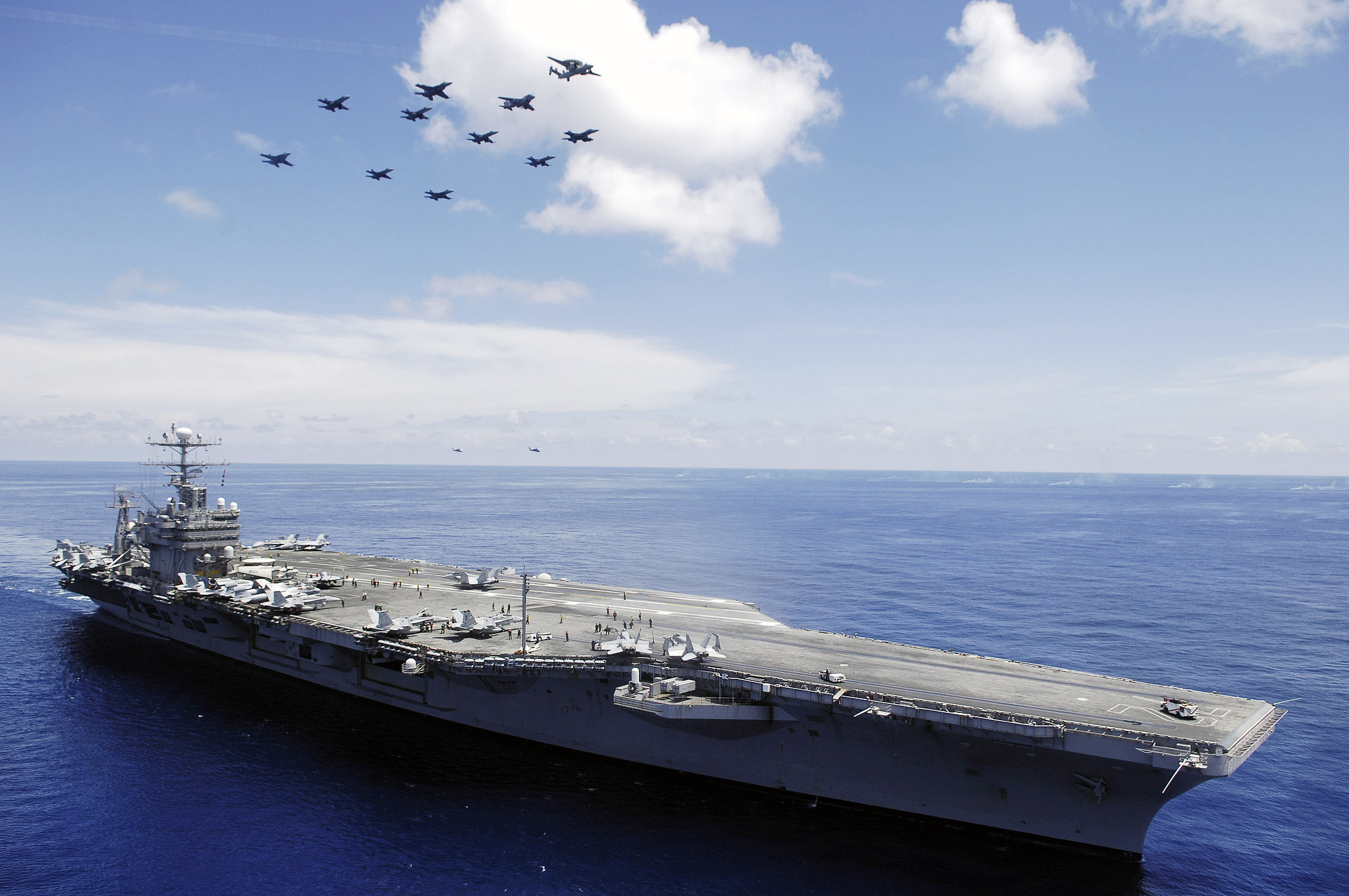
Diverse aircraft from Carrier Air Wing Two fly in formation above the USS Abraham Lincoln.

A carrier air wing (abbreviated CVW) is an operational naval aviation organization composed of several aircraft squadrons and detachments of various types of fixed-wing and rotary-wing aircraft. Organized, equipped and trained to conduct modern US Navy carrier air operations while embarked aboard aircraft carriers, the various squadrons in an air wing have different but complementary (and sometimes overlapping) missions, and provide most of the striking power and electronic warfare capabilities of a carrier battle group (CVBG). While the CVBG term is still used by other nations, the CVBG in US parlance is now known as a carrier strike group (CSG).

Until 1963, Carrier Air Wings were known as Carrier Air Groups (CVGs). Carrier Air Wings are what the United States Air Force would call "composite" wings, and should not be confused with U.S. Navy Type Wings (such as Strike Fighter Wing Atlantic), which are primarily administrative and training commands composed of squadrons of the same type of carrier-based aircraft when not deployed. The United States Marine Corps equivalent command-level organization to a CVW is the Marine Aircraft Group (MAG). However, MAGs are shore-based (with sea-based capability) and may contain any combination of aircraft squadrons and aviation support units. Carrier Air Wings integrate closely with their assigned aircraft carriers, forming a "carrier/air wing team" that trains and deploys together. There are currently nine U.S. Navy Carrier Air Wings; four of the wing commanders and their staffs are based at Naval Air Station Oceana, Virginia, four are based at Naval Air Station Lemoore, California, and one is aboard Marine Corps Air Station Iwakuni, Japan. The squadrons which make up each wing are based at various bases in the U.S. with their respective Type Wing Commanders with the exception of those squadrons assigned to the Japan based airwing which are based at Marine Corps Air Station Iwakuni (fixed wing squadrons) and Naval Air Facility Atsugi, Japan (helicopters).

In addition to the squadrons which happen to be based at NAS Oceana and NAS Lemoore with the wing staffs the CONUS-based air wings also have squadrons based at NAS Whidbey Island, Washington; NAS Point Mugu, NAS North Island, and MCAS Miramar in California; NAS Jacksonville, Florida; MCAS Beaufort, South Carolina; MCAS Cherry Point, North Carolina; and NS Norfolk/Chambers Field, Virginia. These air wings are occasionally reassigned to different aircraft carriers based on carrier maintenance schedules. A modern air wing consists of roughly 1,500 personnel and 74–78 aircraft.

== Origins ==
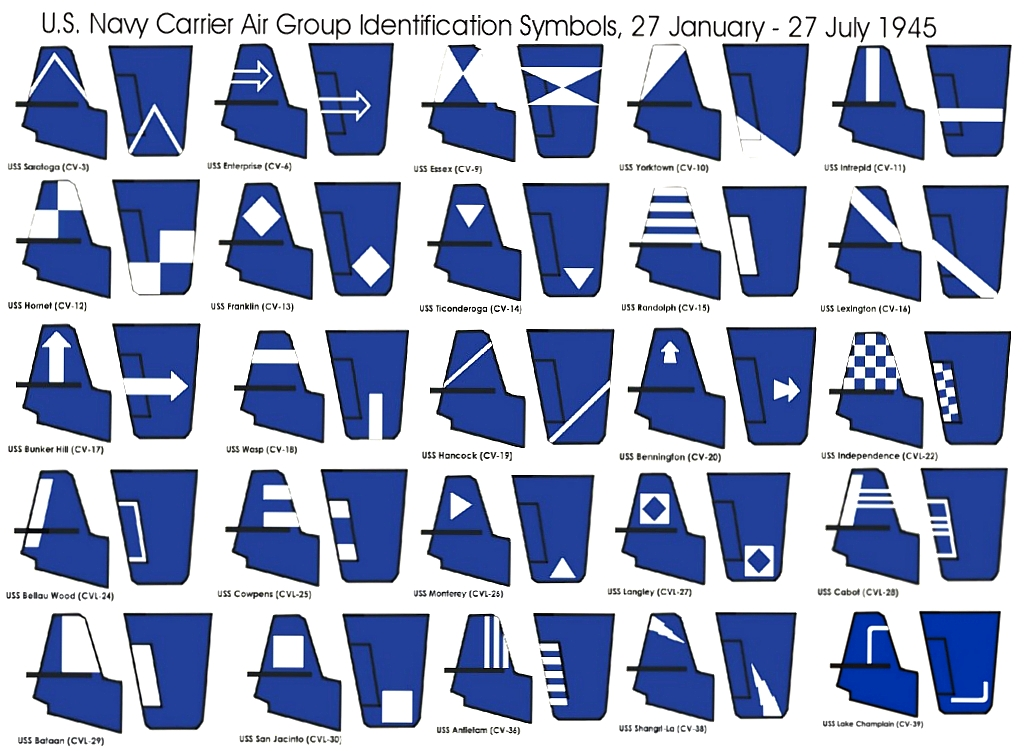
The 1945 Visual Identification System.

Carrier Air Groups (as they were then called) first appeared on 1 July 1937. Prior to this, squadrons were not grouped together, were not permanently assigned to a specific aircraft carrier and were designated serially within each squadron type. On 1 July 1937 for the first time, specific squadrons were grouped together, permanently assigned to a specific aircraft carrier and redesignated with the hull number of that carrier. A year later, on 1 July 1938 authorization for Air Group Commander billets became effective. With that action, the squadrons on board acquired the unity of a formal command and the carrier air group as such first took form. 1 July 1938 is the date recognized by the Navy as the establishment date of it first Carrier Air Groups.

From July 1937 to mid-1942, Carrier Air Groups were permanently assigned to and identified by their parent aircraft carrier, and group squadrons were numbered according to the carrier's hull number. For example, the Enterprise Air Group, assigned to USS Enterprise (CV-6), were all numbered "6": Fighting Squadron (VF) 6, Bombing Squadron (VB) 6, etc. From 1942, numerical designation of carrier air groups began, the first being Carrier Air Group 9 (CVG-9), established on 1 March 1942. For a while, they were given unique numbers according to their assigned carriers' hull number (i.e., the Saratoga Air Group became CVG-3). This numbering scheme was also soon scrapped as carrier air groups (now abbreviated CVGs) frequently moved from carrier to carrier. At this point, the carrier air groups simply retained their number designation regardless of the carrier assigned.

The first formal system for air group identification (Visual Identification System for Naval Aircraft) was established in January 1945. This consisted of geometric symbols that identified the parent carrier, not the air group. As there were just too many carriers and the symbols were hard to remember or to describe over the radio, a single or double letter system was introduced in July 1945. The letters, however, still identified the carrier, not the carrier air group. The following identifications are known:

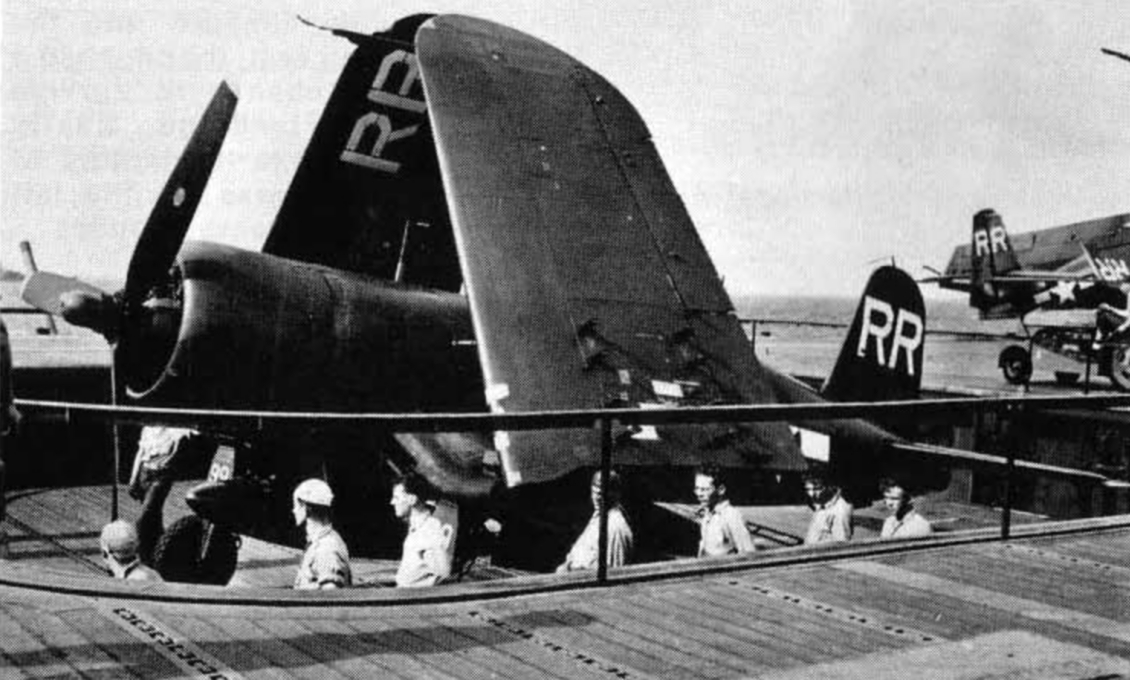
A VBF-88 Goodyear FG-1D Corsair showing the letter code introduced in July 1945.

- USS Saratoga (CV-3): CC
- USS Enterprise (CV-6): M
- USS Essex (CV-9): A
- USS Yorktown (CV-10): RR
- USS Intrepid (CV-11): AF
- USS Hornet (CV-12): S
- USS Ticonderoga (CV-14): V
- USS Randolph (CV-15): L
- USS Lexington (CV-16): H
- USS Wasp (CV-18): X
- USS Hancock (CV-19): U
- USS Bennington (CV-20): TT
- USS Monterey (CVL-26): C
- USS Bon Homme Richard (CV-31): SS
- USS Shangri-La (CV-38): Z

Shangri-La is known to have had her Lightning Bolt on the flight deck forward and aft replaced by her air group identification letter "Z", as the slight remaining Lightning Bolt can be seen painted on the deck beneath the Z on the victory photos of the carrier. Due to the ongoing combat and the end of the war, a mix of identification codes was used in late 1945. Starting in late 1946, the letters identified the carrier air group, and not the carrier. The use of single letters was discontinued in 1957.

On 15 November 1946, to correct the results of demobilization which had left squadron numbers all out of sequence, sweeping changes were made in air unit designations. Carrier Air Groups of four types were designated according to their assigned ship, as CVBG for Battle Carrier, CVG for Attack Carrier, CVLG for Light Carrier and CVEG for Escort Carrier. Two years later, on 1 September 1948, all carrier air groups became CVG regardless of their carrier affiliation.

On 20 December 1963, Carrier Air Groups were retitled Wings, and the acronym CVG became CVW. Replacement Air Groups, which were set up in 1958, became Combat Readiness Air Groups on 1 April 1963. Often known by the short titles RAG and CRAG in the respective periods, their designation throughout was RCVG. When Groups became Wings, CRAG became CRAW and RCVG became RCVW.

From 1960 to 1974, the U.S. Navy also operated Carrier Anti-Submarine Air Groups (CVSG). These typically consisted of two fixed-wing anti-submarine squadrons (VS), a helicopter anti-submarine squadron (HS), and two smaller squadrons or squadron detachments of 3–4 aircraft for airborne early warning (VAW) and self-defense (VA, VMA, VSF, VF).

== Carrier Air Group/Carrier Air Wing Commander ==
The position of Carrier Air Group Commander was officially established in 1938. (Note: Very little official info exists on organization prior to that date. In his recollections book Admiral Joseph.J. Clark mentions he held the newly created position of "Carrier representative" in 1936, with a coordination role, especially when the squadrons were ashore, while he was assistant air officer onboard USS Lexington. Reference : Carrier Admiral by J. J. Clark (1893–1971) with Clark G. Reynolds. (1967). Robert Lawson mentions that a similar position existed - as a collateral duty - onboard the Ranger during the same period but these assignments do not appear in official Navy Department documents (Lawson, 2000 p 39-40)) The CAG was expected to personally lead all major strike operations, co-ordinating the attacks of the carrier's fighter, bomber, and torpedo planes in combat. (Note: There were a few exceptions, either because the CAG preferred to remain on board the carrier or because he was ordered to do so (Lawson, 2000 p. 49).)

The first CAGs were mostly lieutenant-commanders and this practice continued during the first years of World War II (for example, during the Battle of Midway, two of the three Air Groups involved were commanded by lieutenant-commanders) but commander-CAGs gradually became the norm for the large attack carriers.

In 1963 when Carrier Air Groups were retitled Wings, the commander retained the legacy title of "CAG" which continues to this day.

Until 1986, CAGs were typically post-squadron command aviators in the rank of commander. Though the CAG was in command of the air wing, he functioned as a department head reporting to the carrier's commanding officer once the wing embarked. The CAG would typically be promoted to captain after their tour and - if selected - could subsequently command a deep draft support vessel, then an aircraft carrier as a senior captain. (Note: A CAG tour was one of the possible paths to conventional carrier command. Command of nuclear-powered carriers was almost impossible for former CAGs as it required too many steps (nuclear school, executive officier of a nuclear carrier, then deep-draft command) for an aviator to hold a CAG position in between - see Lawson p. 56) In 1986, Secretary of the Navy John Lehman elevated the CAG position to a captain's billet and on-par with aircraft carrier's commander while embarked, both officers reporting directly to the Carrier Battle Group commander. During this transition period some air wings were commanded by commanders, others by captains; these new captain CAGs were dubbed "Super CAGs" or "Senior CAGs" until all air wings transitioned. A deputy CAG (DCAG) position was also created in 1986. Initially filled by a junior captain who had recently completed his (or her) squadron command tour, the position is now filled by a senior captain who "fleets up" and replaces the out-going CAG after about 18 months for a total DCAG-CAG tour duration of 36 months.

A modern carrier air wing has a small command staff consisting of 16–20 officers and approximately 20 enlisted personnel. It is headed by the CAG, who is a navy captain with an aeronautical designation as a Naval Aviator or Naval Flight Officer. In the decade of the 2000s, the Navy and Marine Corps "cross pollinated" Carrier Air Wings and Marine Aircraft Groups by assigning a Marine Corps colonel as the commander of one carrier air wing and a Navy captain as the commander of one Marine aircraft group. That practice ceased before the end of the decade.

The CAG staff includes an operations officer (typically a commander), a number of warfare specialists (typically lieutenant commanders or lieutenants), two wing landing signal officers, an intelligence officer, a weapons officer and a maintenance officer. The air wing staff is often supplemented with squadron personnel, such as the squadron intelligence officers. The CAG reports to a rear admiral in the position of commander, Carrier Strike Group and is equal with the commanding officer of the aircraft carrier as well as the embarked Destroyer Squadron (DESRON) commander and the attached guided missile cruiser commanding officer. The CAG serves as the Strike Group's strike warfare commander, responsible for all offensive strike operations (including Tomahawk missiles). CAGs are typically qualified to fly at least two types of aircraft in the Carrier Air Wing inventory.

== Carrier Air Group/Wing composition ==
=== World War II ===
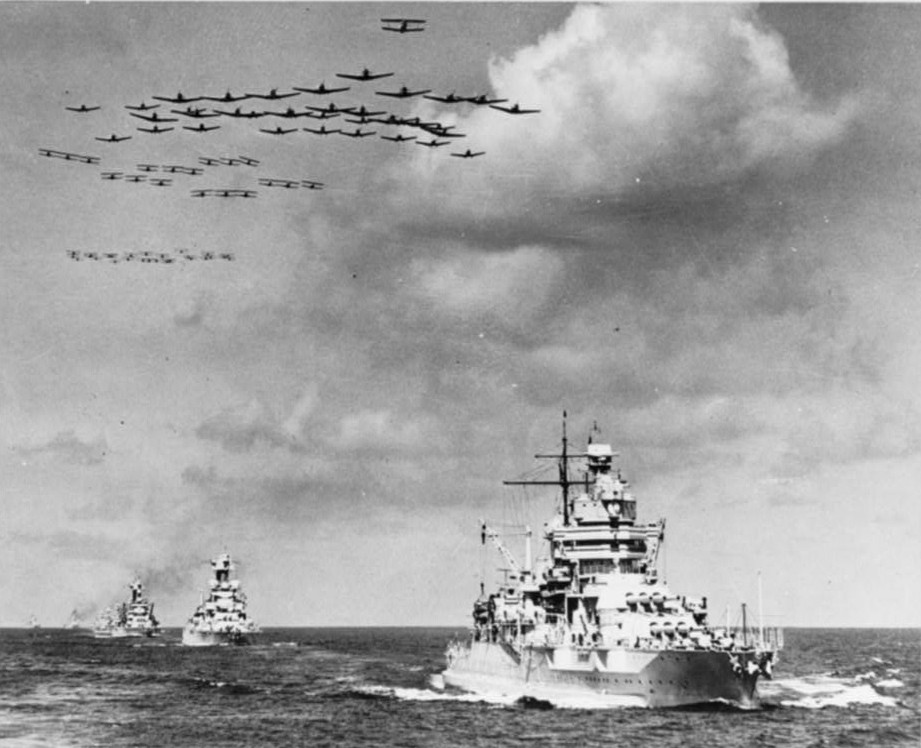
A Carrier Air Group over battleships in 1940.

Typical air group composition aboard the Yorktown-class carriers, at the beginning of World War II, consisted of approximately 72 aircraft:

- 1 fighter squadron (VF) composed of 18 Grumman F4F Wildcats
- 1 bombing squadron (VB) composed of 18 Douglas SBD Dauntless dive bombers
- 1 scouting squadron (VS) composed of 18 Douglas SBD Dauntless dive bombers
- 1 torpedo squadron (VT) composed of 18 Douglas TBD Devastator or Grumman TBF/TBM Avenger torpedo bombers

During the course of the war in the Pacific, the compositions of the air groups changed drastically. The scouting squadrons were disestablished by early 1943 and the number of fighter planes was increased continuously. Typically in 1943 an Essex class carrier carried 36 fighters, 36 bombers and 18 torpedo planes.

By early 1945, a typical Essex air group was over 100 aircraft, consisting of :

- 2 large fighter squadrons with up to 36 Grumman F6F Hellcat or Vought F4U Corsair each. One was officially a fighter squadron (VF) and the other a fighter-bomber squadron (VBF) but the planes (and the missions) of the 2 squadrons were identical
- about 8 night-fighting and photo-reconnaissance F6F Hellcats (included in the F6F-equipped squadrons or as separate detachments in the air groups formed of F4U squadrons)
- 1 squadron of 15 Grumman TBM Avenger torpedo bombers
- 1 squadron of 15 Curtiss SB2C Helldiver dive bombers

There were numerous variations, with some air group entirely discarding the dive bombers and a few dedicated night air groups composed exclusively of night fighters and night bombers

=== Korea and Cold War (1950–1953) ===
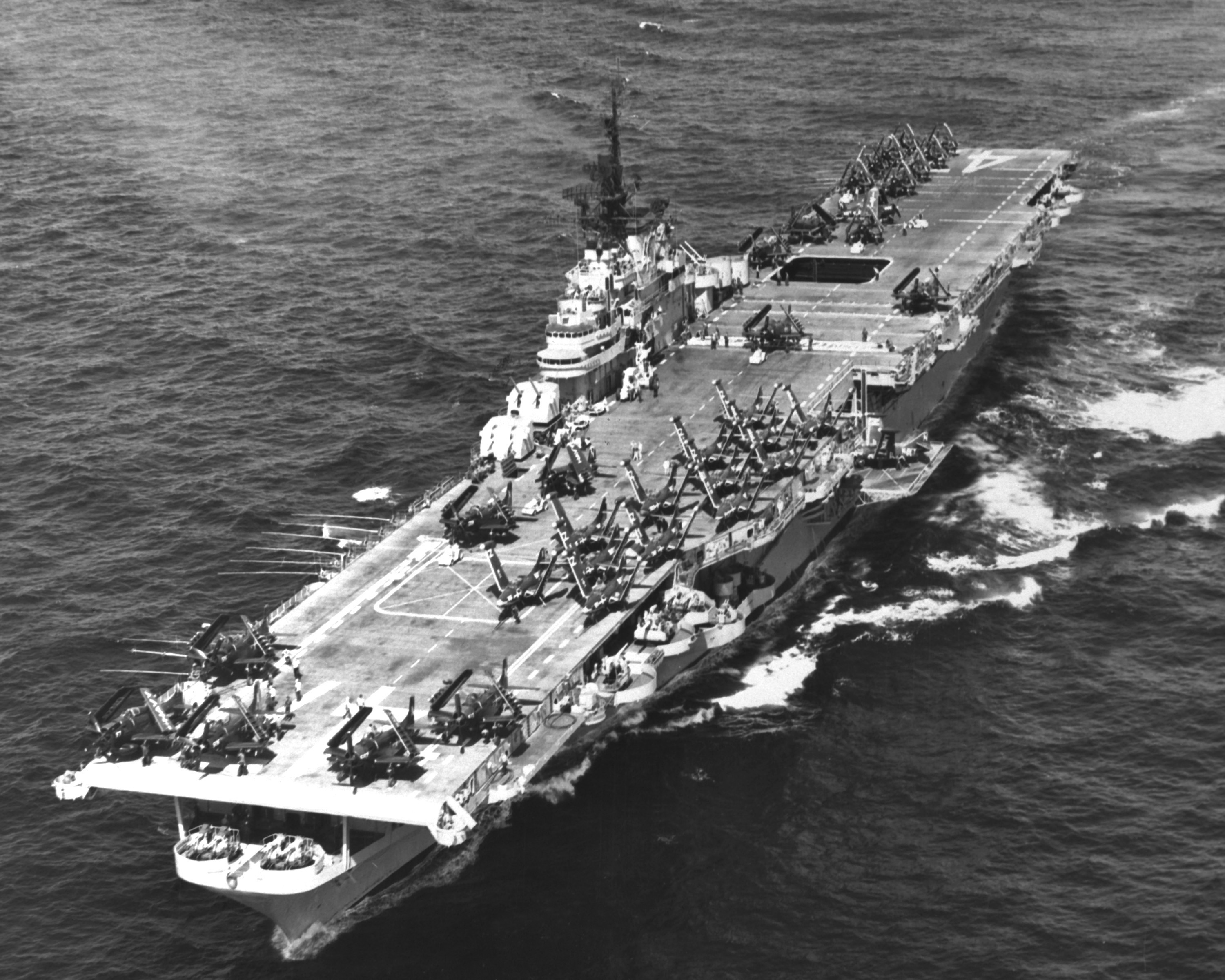
CVG-9 aboard USS Philippine Sea, 1953.

Carrier Air Groups typically had four fighter squadrons with 58 planes and an attack squadron of 14 planes.

- 2–3 jet fighter/fighter bomber squadrons flying the Grumman F9F Panther or the McDonnell F2H Banshee
- 1–2 piston fighter squadrons flying Vought F4U Corsairs
- 1 attack squadron flying Douglas AD Skyraiders
- various detachments flying photo-reconnaissance versions of the Panther or Banshee jets, night fighters and HO3S rescue helicopters

New to the air wings in the Cold War period after Korea and just prior to Vietnam were specialized squadrons or detachments of aircraft for heavy attack/nuclear strike (VAH), photographic reconnaissance (VAP/VFP, RVAH), airborne early warning (VAW), all-weather medium attack (VA), advanced twin-seat fighters (VF), electronic countermeasures (VAQ), and rescue and plane guard helicopters (HU).

=== Cold War (1955–1960) ===
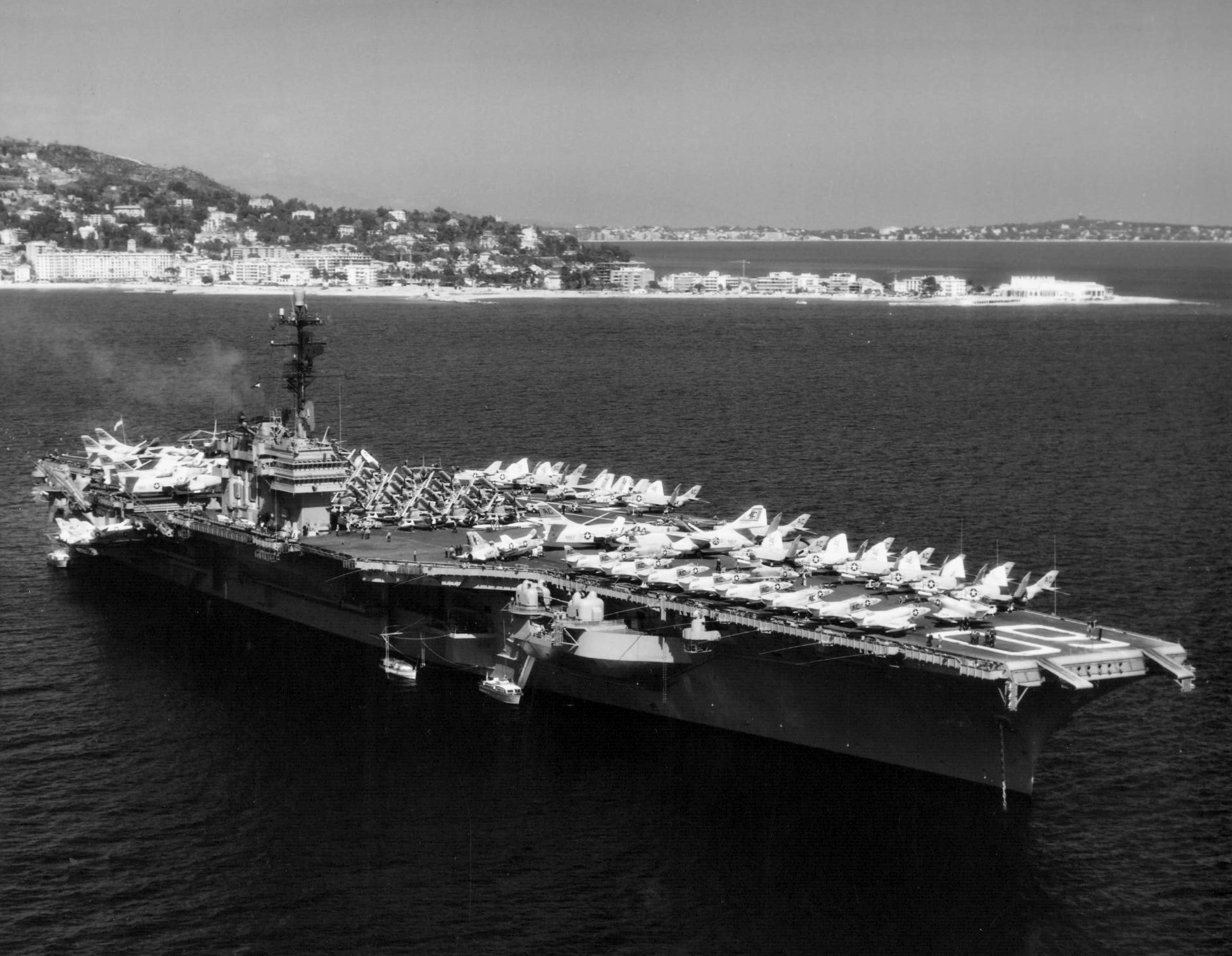
USS Saratoga (CV-60) underway 1958 off the shores of Cannes

Typical carrier air group of a Forrestal-class aircraft carrier during the second half of the 1950's.

- 1 fighter squadron (VF) flying 12 McDonnell F3H-2N Demons or Douglas F4D Skyrays
- 1 fighter squadron (VF) flying 12 North American FJ-2/-3 Furys or Vought F8U-1 Crusaders
- 1 attack squadron (VA) flying 10 Grumman F9F-8B Cougars and later 2 attack squadrons of Douglas A-4 Skyhawks
- 1 attack squadron (VA) flying 10 Douglas AD-6 (A-1H) Skyraiders
- 1 heavy attack squadron (VAH) flying 10 Douglas A3D Skywarriors
- 1 detachment of all weather attack squadron (VAAW) flying 3 Douglas AD-5N (A-1G) Skyraiders
- 1 carrier airborne early warning (VAW) squadron detachment of 3 Douglas AD-5W (EA-1E) or Douglas AD-5Q (EA-1F) Skyraider airborne early warning aircraft
- various detachments flying photo-reconnaissance (VFP/Det) versions of the Grumman F9H Panther or McDonnell Banshee and later Vought F8U-1P Crusader jets (3-4 jets/detachment), and Piasecki HUP Retriever (HU) rescue helicopters

=== Vietnam (1964–1973) and Cold War (1959–1973) ===
During the Vietnam War, Attack Carrier Air Wings typically consisted of approximately 70 aircraft, including two fighter squadrons and three attack squadrons, plus the special squadrons and detachments (VAW, VAQ, RVAH or VFP, VQ, HC or HS).

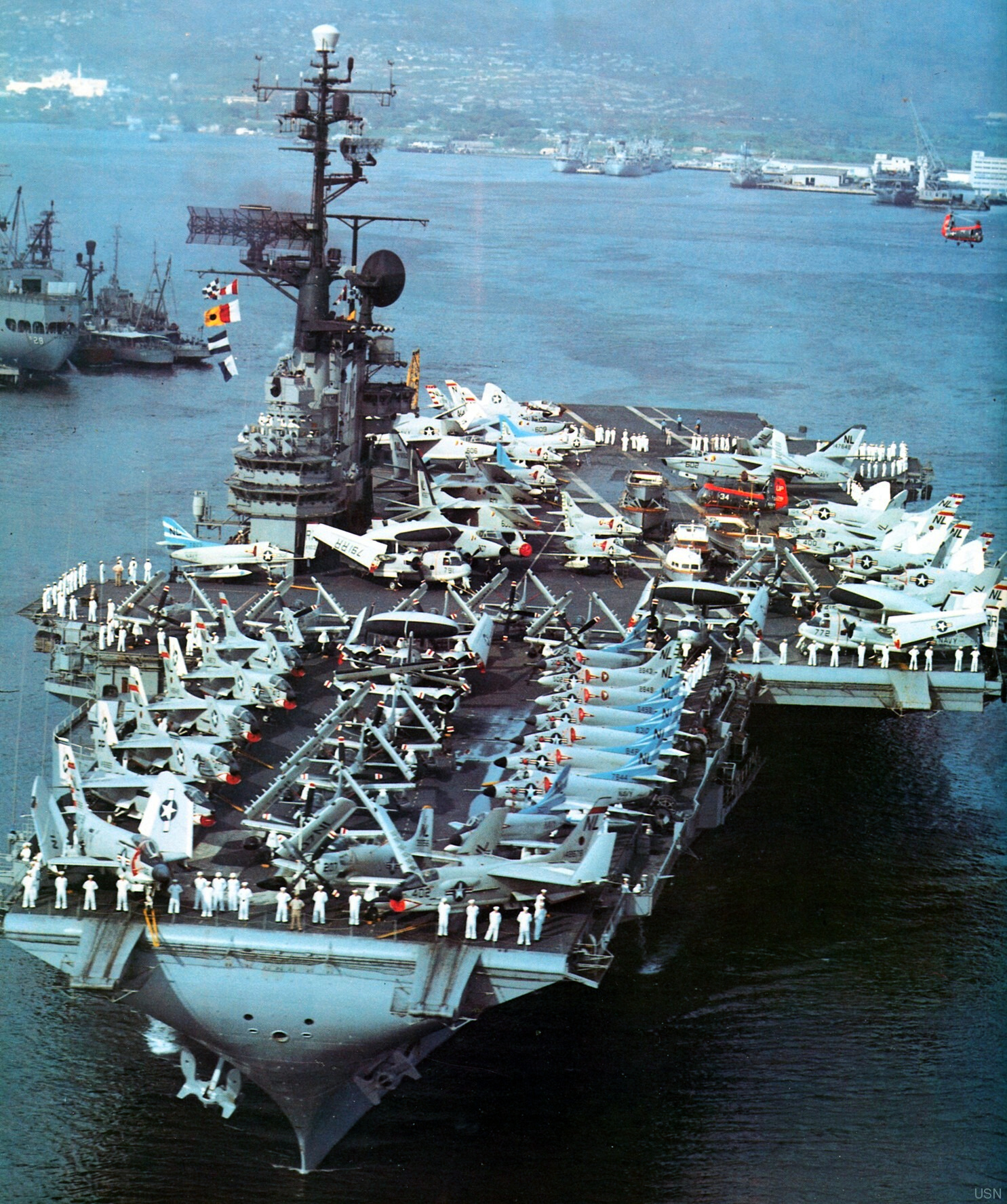
CVG-15 aboard USS Coral Sea, 1963.

In 1965, a typical Carrier Air Wing consisted of:

- 2 fighter squadrons (VF) flying Vought F-8 Crusaders or McDonnell-Douglas F-4 Phantom IIs
- 2 light attack squadrons (VA) flying Douglas A-4 Skyhawks
- 1 attack squadron (VA) flying Douglas A-1 Skyraiders or Grumman A-6 Intruders
- 1 heavy attack squadron (VAH) flying Douglas A-3 Skywarriors or North American A-5 Vigilantes
- 1 light photographic squadron (VFP) detachment flying Vought RF-8 Crusaders or 1 reconnaissance attack squadron (RVAH) flying North American RA-5C Vigilantes
- 1 carrier airborne early warning (VAW) squadron detachment of 2–3 Grumman E-1 Tracer airborne early warning aircraft

By the end of the Vietnam War in 1973, a typical air wing consisted of ~90 aircraft:

- 2 fighter squadrons (VF) flying McDonnell-Douglas F-4 Phantom IIs or Vought F-8 Crusaders (the latter on Essex class carriers)
- 2 light attack squadrons (VA) flying LTV A-7 Corsair IIs or Douglas A-4 Skyhawks
- 1 medium/all weather attack squadron (VA) flying Grumman A-6 Intruders
- 1 electronic warfare squadron (VAQ) flying Douglas EKA-3B Skywarriors (also served as aerial refueling tankers) or Grumman EA-6B Prowlers
- 1 airborne early warning squadron (VAW) flying 3–4 Northrop Grumman E-2 Hawkeye aircraft
- 1 reconnaissance attack squadron (RVAH) flying 3–6 North American RA-5C Vigilantes on Forrestal class and larger carriers, or a detachment of RF-8G Crusaders from a light photographic reconnaissance squadron (VFP)
- Detachments of Sikorsky SH-3 Sea Kings or Kaman UH-2 Seasprites from a helicopter combat support squadron (HC)

Between 1960 and 1973 anti-submarine air groups (CVSG) aboard the Essex-class anti-submarine carriers (CVS) operated up to five squadrons and two detachments:

- 2 or 3 anti-submarine squadrons (VS) flying Grumman S-2 Trackers
- 1 or 2 helicopter anti-submarine squadron (HS) flying Sikorsky SH-3A Sea Kings
- 1 early warning squadron (VAW) detachment of 4 Grumman E-1 Tracers
- a detachment of 4 Douglas A-4 Skyhawks for self-defense from various Navy or Marine Corps squadrons (VSF, VA, VMA, H&MS)

From 1969 to 1977, a number of carrier air wings were disestablished in the post-Vietnam drawdown: Carrier Air Wing 10 on 20 November 1969, (Note: The original CVG 10 during the war was established on 16 Apr 1942 and disestablished 16 Nov 1945. CVG-10 was established on 1 May 1952. CVG-10 was redesignated CVW-10 on 20 December 1963. CVW 10 made one deployment aboard USS Shangri-La in the Mediterranean, and three deployments off Vietnam aboard USS Intrepid.) Readiness Carrier Air Wing 12 on 1 June 1970, Readiness Carrier Air Wing 4 on 1 July 1970, Carrier Air Wing 16 on 30 June 1971, Carrier Air Wing 21 on 12 December 1975, and Carrier Air Wing 19 on 30 June 1977 along with all of the Anti-Submarine Air Groups which were disestablished by 1974.

=== Cold War (1974–1990) and the 1983 Invasion of Grenada ===
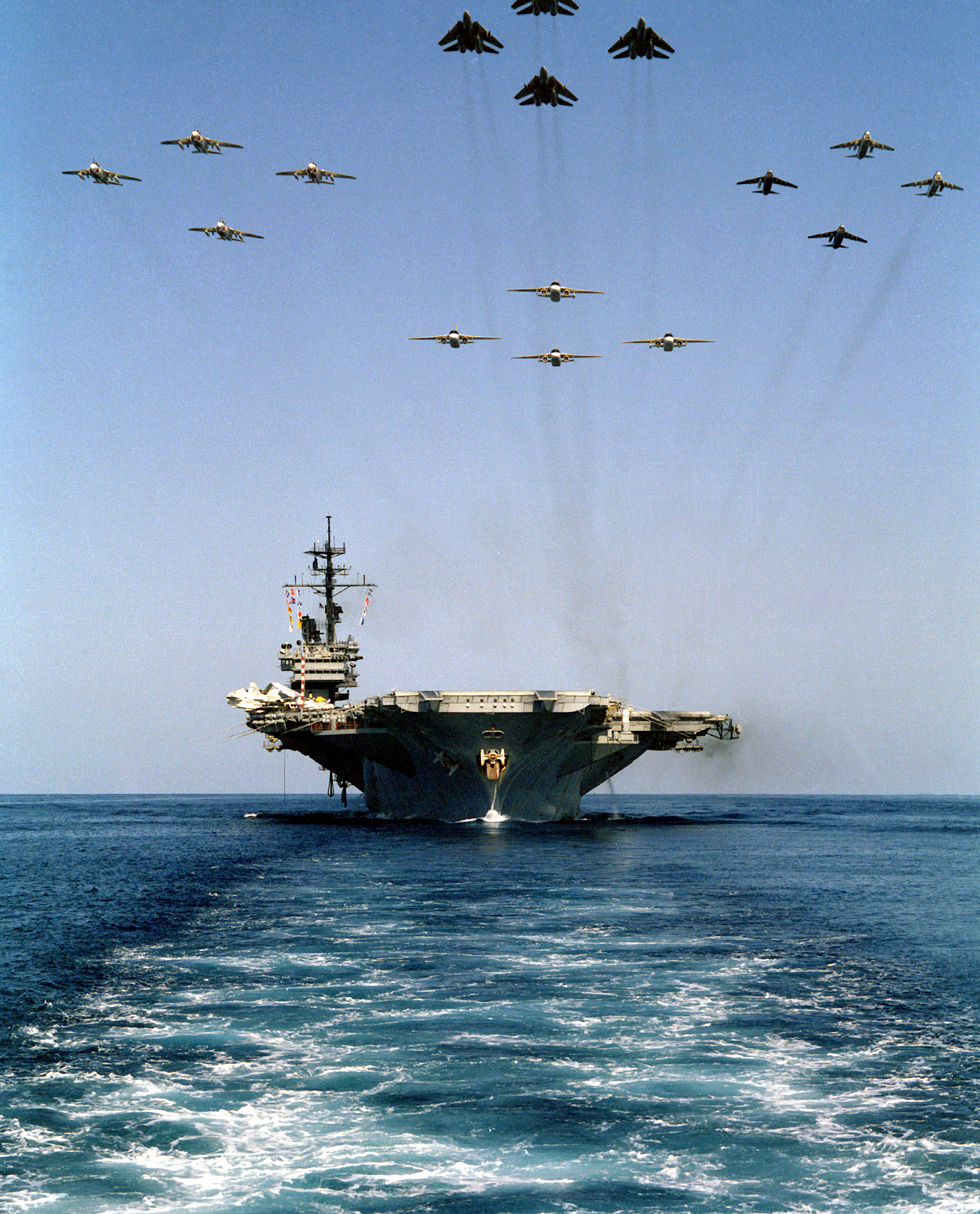
CVW-1 over USS America in 1983.

In the mid 1970s the Navy decommissioned its Anti-Submarine Aircraft Carriers (CVS) and its Attack Carriers (CVA) were re-designated CV. The VS and HS squadrons of the former Anti-Submarine Air Groups joined the Carrier Air Wings and the HS squadrons, in addition to their Anti-Submarine role, assumed the search and rescue (SAR) and plane guard roles formerly filled by the HC detachments. By the early 1980s, typical air wings were replacing F-4 Phantom IIs with Grumman F-14 Tomcats on Forrestal, Kitty Hawk, Enterprise and Nimitz class carriers and with F/A-18 Hornets onboard Midway class carriers. LTV A-7 Corsair IIs were also being replaced with F/A-18s, while Grumman KA-6D Intruder tankers and A-6E bombers with aerial refueling pods had replaced A-3s as tankers. EA-6B Prowlers had largely replaced EA-3s in the VAQ mission, although detachments of EA-3s from fleet air reconnaissance squadrons (VQ) soldiered on through the late 1980s as ELINT aircraft until replaced by the Lockheed ES-3A Shadow in the carrier-based VQ mission. The North American RA-5C Vigilante was also phased out in January 1980, replaced by F-14 Tomcats with Tactical Air Reconnaissance Pods (TARPS). The typical Carrier Air Wing of this period consisted of the following.

- 2 fighter squadrons (VF) of 12 F-4s or F-14s, or 2 strike fighter squadrons (VFA) of 12 F/A-18As on Midway class carriers
  - Marine fighter attack squadrons (VMFA) with F-4s or F/A-18As could occasionally substitute for a VF or VFA squadron
- 2 attack squadrons (VA) of 12 A-7Es or 2 to 1 strike fighter squadrons of 12 F/A-18s
- 1–2 all-weather attack squadron (VA) 10–12 A-6E (including 2–4 KA-6D tankers)
  - Marine medium attack – all-weather squadron (VMA(AW)) with A-6Es could occasionally substitute for a medium VA squadron
- 1 early warning squadron (VAW) of 4–6 E-2Cs
- 1 tactical electronic warfare squadron (VAQ) or Marine tactical electronic warfare squadron (VMAQ) of 4 EA-6Bs
- 1 anti-submarine squadron (VS) of 10 Lockheed S-3A Vikings
- 1 helicopter anti-submarine squadron (HS) of 6 SH-3H Sea Kings
- 1 reconnaissance attack squadron (RVAH) flying North American RA-5C Vigilantes (until Jan 1980) or 1 detachment of RF-8Gs from a light photographic reconnaissance squadron (VFP) or RF-4s from a Marine photographic reconnaissance squadron (VMFP)
  - If one of the F-14 squadrons was Tactical Air Reconnaissance Pod Systems (TARPS)-capable, the VFP detachment or VMFP detachment would be deleted
- 1 detachment of EA-3B ELINT aircraft from a fleet air reconnaissance squadron (VQ)

On 1 March 1984, Carrier Air Wing 13 was established. Between 1 October 1985 and 30 September 1989 the wing made three deployments aboard Coral Sea. A new Carrier Air Wing 10 was established on 1 November 1986 for eighteen months, but it was then disestablished in March 1988.

=== 1991 Gulf War and Post-Cold War (1992–2000) ===
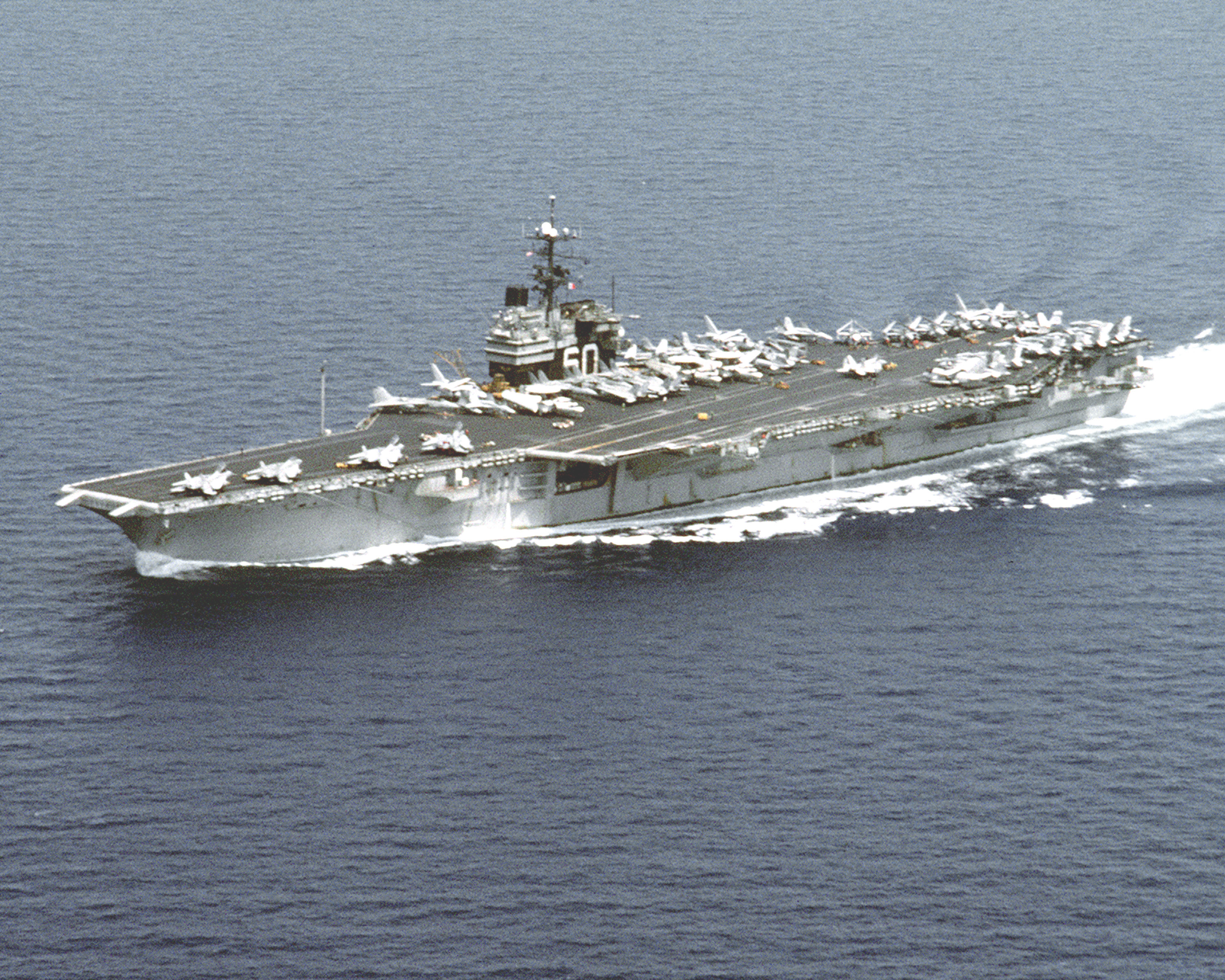
CVW-17 aboard USS Saratoga in 1992.

The Gulf War marked the largest concentrated use of carrier air wings since World War II. All F-4s had been retired and A-7Es had largely been replaced with F/A-18 Hornets.

- 2 fighter squadrons (VF) of 10–12 F-14 Tomcats, including TARPS photo reconnaissance aircraft
- 2 strike fighter squadrons (VFA) of 12 F/A-18 Hornets
- 1 medium attack squadron (VA) 16 A-6E SWIP/TRAM intruders (including 4 KA-6D tankers).
- 1 early warning squadron (VAW) of 4–6 E-2Cs
- 1 tactical electronic warfare squadron (VAQ) of 4–6 EA-6Bs (renamed "electronic attack squadron" in 1998)
- 1 anti-submarine squadron (VS) of 8 S-3A/B Vikings (All S-3As had been retired by 1993)
- 1 helicopter anti-submarine squadron (HS) of 6 SH-3H Sea Kings or 6 SH-60F and 2 HH-60H Seahawks (Sea Kings had all been replaced by Seahawks by 1995)
- 1 Detachment of ES-3A Shadow ELINT aircraft from a fleet air reconnaissance squadron (VQ)
- 1 detachment of C-2A Greyhound aircraft for Carrier Onboard Delivery (COD)

From 1991 to 1995, several Type/Model/Series (T/M/S) aircraft were phased out of the active inventory (e.g., Regular Navy and Naval Air Reserve), to include the RF-8G Crusader, the A-7E Corsair II, ES-3A Shadow, SH-3H Sea King and the A-6E and KA-6D Intruder. While some of these retirements were due to obsolescence (RF-8G) or succession by newer aircraft (A-7Es replaced by F/A-18s), others were due strictly to post-Cold War perceived "Peace Dividend" budget measures on the part of certain Secretaries of Defense and the U.S. Congress (e.g., A-6 Intruder), with aircraft that still had useful remaining life being prematurely relegated to retirement. Other T/M/S aircraft saw the number of operational squadrons significantly reduced (e.g., F-14 Tomcat, E-2 Hawkeye) for similar budgetary reasons. During the same period, three more carrier air wings were disestablished: the Atlantic Fleet's Carrier Air Wing 13 on 1 January 1991, (Note: VFA-136 first deployed in September 1987 with CVW-13 on board the USS Coral Sea.) followed by Carrier Air Wing 6 on 1 April 1992, and the Pacific Fleet's Carrier Air Wing 15 on 31 March 1995. In addition, the U.S. Naval Reserve's Carrier Air Wing Reserve 30 (CVWR-30) was disestablished on 31 December 1994.

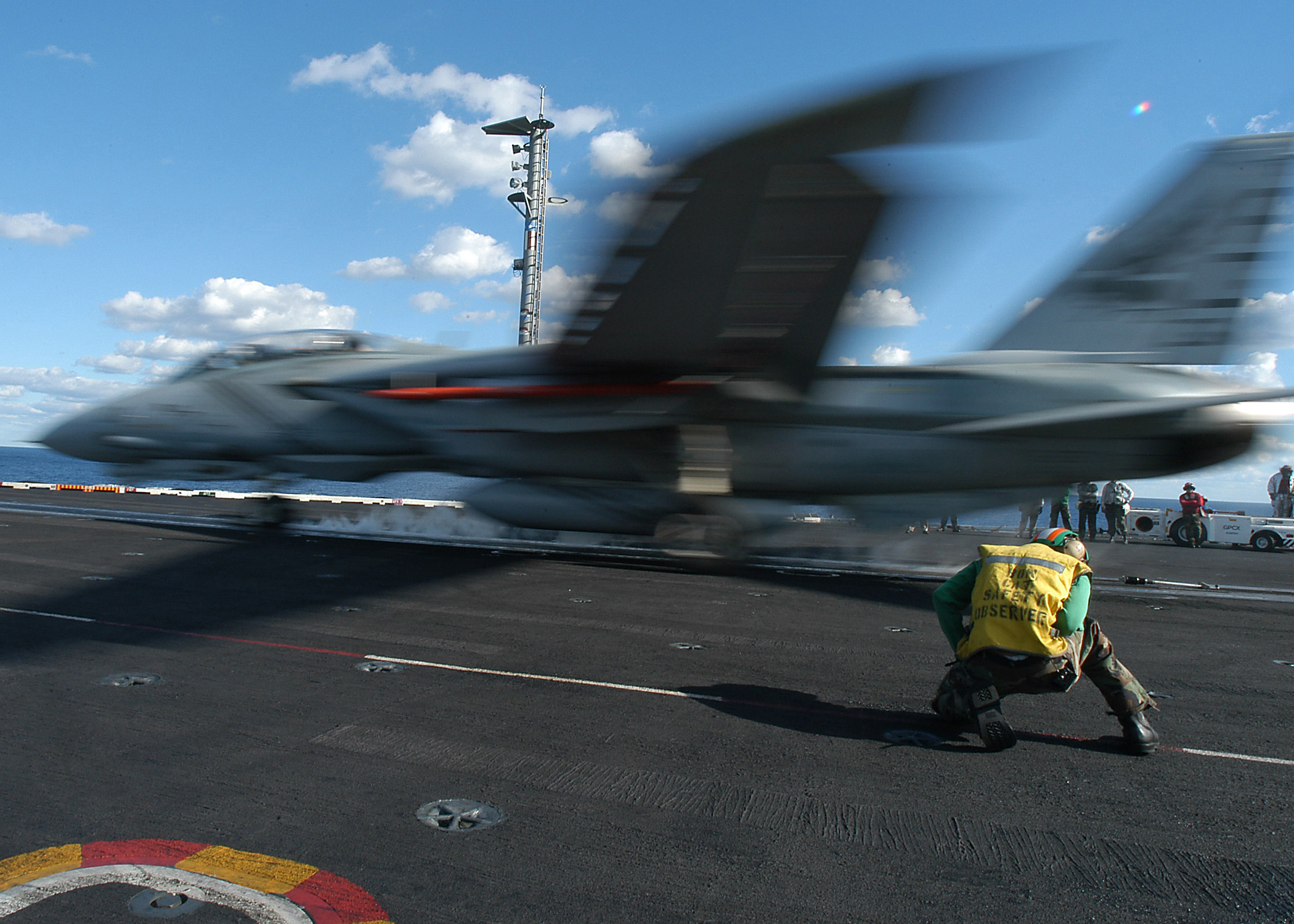
At sea aboard USS George Washington (CVN 73), 21 Nov. 2003. Flight Deck Safety Observer, Aviation Boatswain's Mate 3rd Class Harrison Brookes braces himself as an F-14B Tomcat, assigned to Carrier Air Wing Seven (CVW-7) is launched from one of four steam driven catapults on the ship's flight deck.

In 1992, a program named CV Integration began with Marine Corps EA-6B and F-18 squadrons augmenting Carrier Airwings due to the shortage of EA-6Bs and F-18 aircraft in the inventory. In 1996, the last Marine Corps EA-6B squadron completed their CV Integration aboard the USS America which was making its final cruise. Marine Corps F-18 squadrons continued to augment Navy carrier airwings on both East and West Coast Airwings.

=== 2003 Iraq War ===
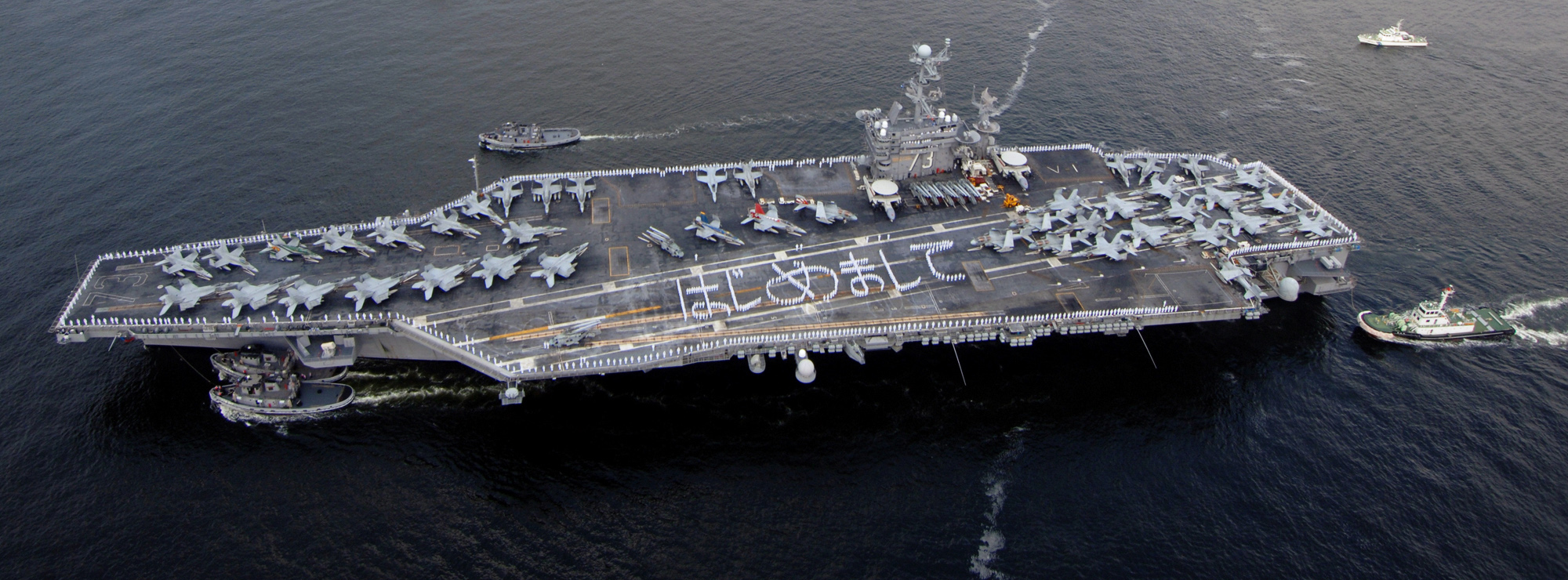
CVW-5 aboard USS George Washington, 2008.

By 2003, A-6s had been retired with their tanking duties being assumed by S-3s, ES-3s had been retired, and older F-14s were being phased out by the FA-18 E/F Super Hornets.

- 1 fighter squadron (VF) of 10 F-14A/B/Ds or 1 strike fighter squadron (VFA) of 12 F/A-18F Super Hornets
- 1 strike fighter squadron (VFA) of 12 F/A-18C Hornets or 12 F/A-18E Super Hornets
- 2 strike fighter squadrons (VFA) or Marine fighter attack squadrons (VMFA) of 12 F/A-18C Hornets
- 1 early warning squadron (VAW) of 4 E-2Cs (renamed "airborne command and control squadron" in 2019)
- 1 electronic attack squadron (VAQ) of 4–5 EA-6Bs
- 1 sea control squadron (VS) of 8 S-3Bs (primary aerial tankers)
- 1 helicopter anti-submarine squadron (HS) of 6 SH-60F and 2 HH-60H
- 1 detachment of C-2A Greyhound aircraft for Carrier Onboard Delivery (COD)

=== Current carrier air wing ===
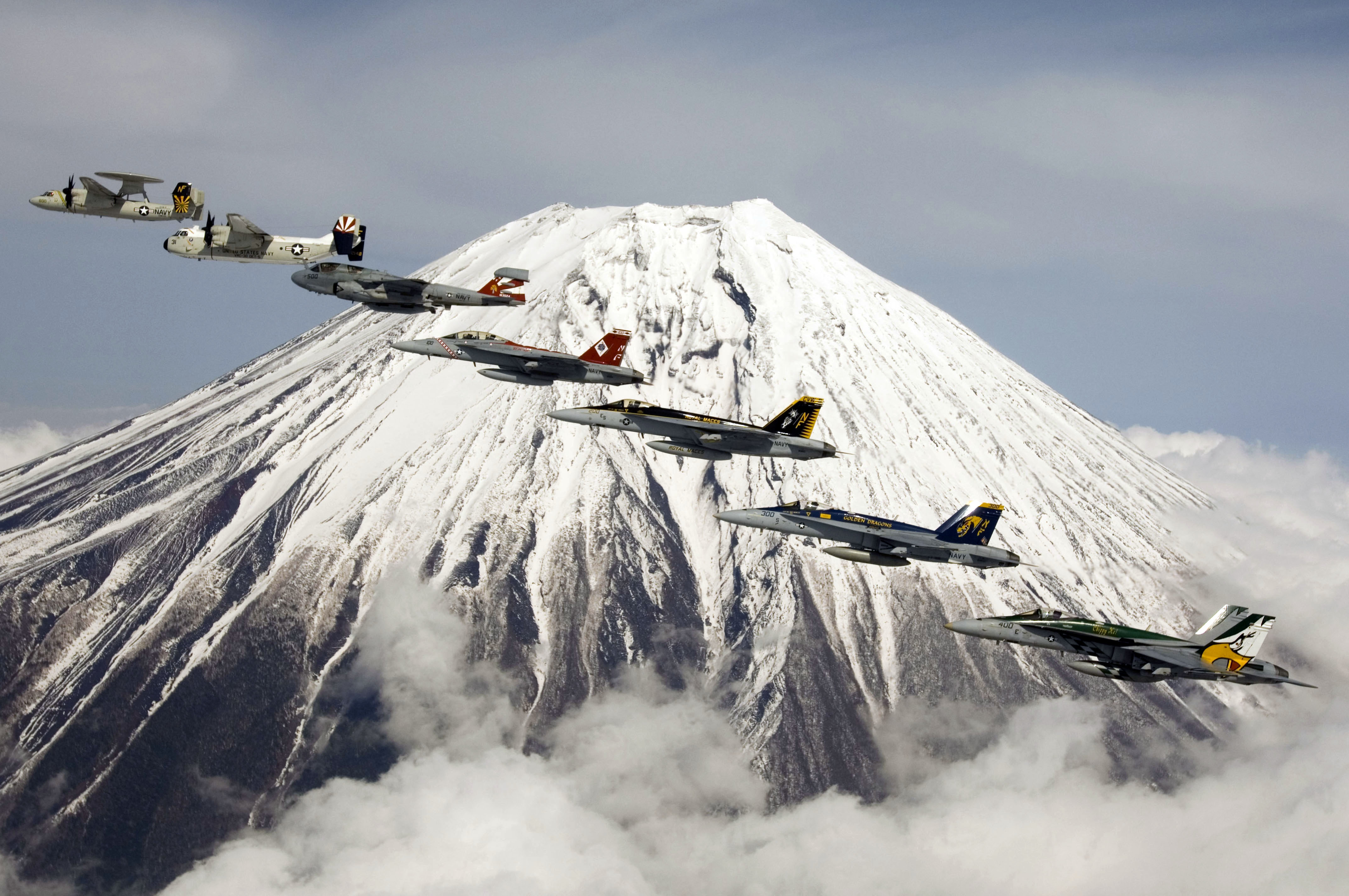
Carrier Air Wing Five aircraft in 2007.

By 2008, the S-3B Vikings had been retired and the VS squadrons deactivated, the HS squadrons were beginning a transition from their Anti-Submarine SH-60F helicopter to the new MH-60S Naval Special Warfare support, Combat Search and Rescue, and Logistics support helicopter and were being re-designated Helicopter Sea Combat (HSC) squadrons. The Navy's other new helicopter at the time, the MH-60R combined and improved the Anti-Submarine and Anti-Surface Warfare capabilities of the old SH-60F and the old SH-60B surface ship based Light Airborne Multi-Purpose System (LAMPS) helicopter and were equipping a new carrier based helicopter squadron called the Helicopter Maritime Strike squadron (HSM). The HSM squadrons ultimately replaced the VS and HS squadrons as the carrier air wing's Anti-Submarine and Anti-Surface Warfare squadron and the VS tanking role was assumed by the air wing's Super Hornet squadrons. By the beginning of the 2010s the VAQ squadrons began their transition from the EA-6B to the new EA-18G Growler.

Today's air wing composition is designed to allow for broad striking power hundreds of miles from the carrier's position, while providing defense in depth of the battle group through early warning and detection of airborne, surface and subsurface targets. The current U.S. Navy carrier air wing consists of:

- Four strike fighter (VFA) squadrons with ten or twelve F/A-18E/F Super Hornets each, or three Super Hornet squadrons and one ten-aircraft squadron of F-35C Lightning IIs to be adjusted up to fourteen per squadron as the Navy continues to receive new aircraft (over forty strike fighters total). The first deployment of an F-35C squadron was in 2021. 2021 was also the year of the last deployment of an F/A-18C Hornet squadron (VMFA-323). The typical mix is one F/A-18F (two-seat) Super Hornet squadron (though some air wings have two F/A-18F squadrons) and three single-seat F/A-18E Super Hornet squadrons. As the F-35C continues to come on line, it will replace one of the F/A-18E squadrons in each air wing. In up to four air wings, the F-35C Lightning II squadron could be a U.S. Marine Corps fighter attack (VMFA) squadron as the Marine Corps is transitioning six of its active component squadrons to the F-35C. The current USN–USMC agreement is for the USMC to provide a VMFA squadron for two air wings.
- One electronic attack (VAQ) squadron, made up of seven EA-18G Growlers. Prior to the early 2020s, the VAQ squadrons were composed of five aircraft.
- One airborne command and control (VAW) squadron with four E-2C Hawkeyes or five E-2D "Advanced" Hawkeyes.
- One helicopter sea combat (HSC) squadron of eight MH-60S Seahawks. HSC squadrons were reduced to five MH-60S Seahawks in 2023.
- One helicopter maritime strike (HSM) squadron of eleven MH-60R Seahawks, six of which are in detachments based on other ships of the carrier strike group.
- In 2021 the new CMV-22B Osprey of newly established fleet logistics multi-mission (VRM) squadron detachments of three aircraft began to replace fleet logistics support (VRC) squadron detachments of two C-2A Greyhounds. That replacement was completed in 2026.

== Active Carrier Air Wings and identification ==
Atlantic Fleet air wings have an "A" as the first letter of their tail code identification, while those of the Pacific Fleet have an "N". The "A" or "N" is followed by a letter that uniquely identifies the air wing (e.g., CVW-1 aircraft, part of the Atlantic Fleet, have a tail code of "AB").

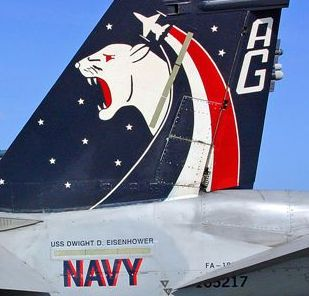
"AG" on tail indicates it is an Atlantic Fleet CVW-7 aircraft. The ship assigned is also indicated below the tail.

Air wing	Insignia	Tail code	Home port (Note: This is the home port of the Wing Commander and staff. The wing's squadrons are all home ported with their Type Wings except for the squadrons of CVW-5 which are all home ported in either MCAS Iwakuni (fixed wing squadrons) or NAF Atsugi (rotary wing squadrons))	Assigned aircraft carrier
CVW-1		AB	NAS Oceana	USS Harry S. Truman
CVW-2		NE	NAS Lemoore	USS Carl Vinson
CVW-3		AC	NAS Oceana	USS Dwight D. Eisenhower
CVW-5		NF	MCAS Iwakuni	USS George Washington
CVW-7		AG	NAS Oceana	USS George H.W. Bush
CVW-8		AJ	NAS Oceana	USS Gerald R. Ford
CVW-9		NG	NAS Lemoore	USS Abraham Lincoln
CVW-11		NH	NAS Lemoore	USS Theodore Roosevelt
CVW-17		NA	NAS Lemoore	USS Nimitz

CVW-17 transferred from Atlantic Fleet (with tail code AA) to Pacific Fleet (with tail code NA) in 2012 and was reassigned to USS Carl Vinson. USS Enterprise decommissioned in December 2012 and CVW-1 was reassigned to USS Theodore Roosevelt in 2013 until USS Theodore Roosevelt shifted homeport to San Diego in 2015 at which time CVW-17 shifted to her.

With the inactivation of CVWR-30 in 1994, the single remaining U.S. Navy Reserve Carrier Air Wing was Carrier Air Wing Reserve Twenty (CVWR-20). On 1 April 2007, CVWR-20 was redesignated as Tactical Support Wing (TSW) which is a land based Functional Wing:

Official name	Insignia	Headquarters	Tail code
Tactical Support Wing		Naval Air Station Joint Reserve Base Fort Worth	AF

== See also ==
- List of United States Navy aircraft wings
