= Mission Accomplished speech =

2003 speech by U.S. President George W. Bush

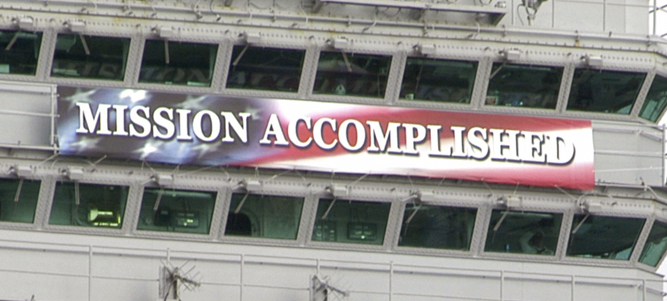
The banner

Mission Accomplished is the name given to a televised speech made on May 1, 2003, by United States president George W. Bush on the aircraft carrier USS Abraham Lincoln near the coast of California. Bush, who had launched the United States invasion of Iraq six weeks earlier, mounted a podium in front of a White House-produced banner that read "Mission Accomplished". Reading from a prepared text, he said, "Major combat operations in Iraq have ended. In the battle of Iraq, the United States and our allies have prevailed ... because the regime [of Iraqi dictator Saddam Hussein] is no more." Although Bush went on to say that "Our mission continues" and "We have difficult work to do in Iraq", his words implied that the Iraq War was over and the United States-led Coalition forces had won.

Bush's assertions—and the sign itself—became controversial as the Iraqi insurgency gained pace and developed into an outright sectarian war, with the vast majority of casualties—Coalition forces and Iraqi, military and civilian—occurring after the speech. U.S. troops fought in Iraq for eight more years, before eventually withdrawing in 2011 and later re-intervening in 2014. In modern cultural parlance, the phrase "Mission Accomplished" is frequently used to refer to the perils of declaring victory too early in crises.

== Description ==
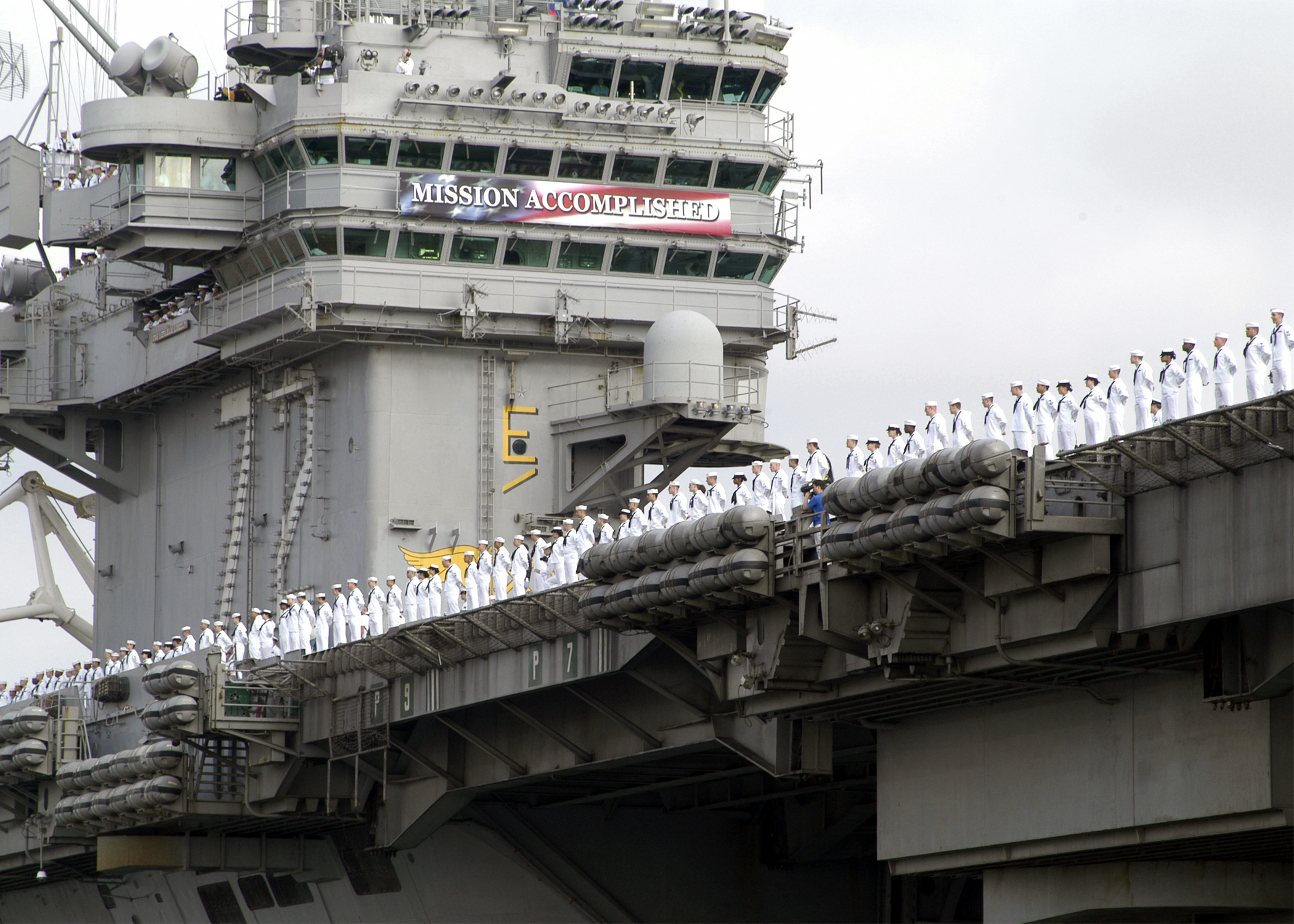
The USS Abraham Lincoln returning to port carrying the Mission Accomplished banner

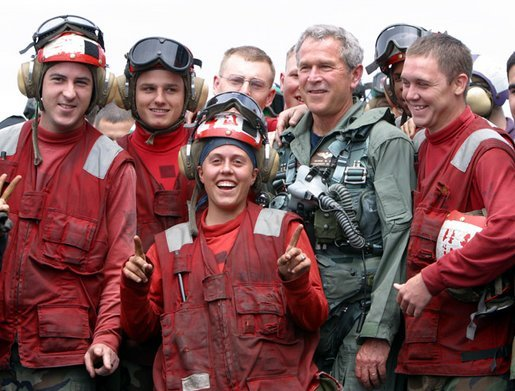
President George W. Bush poses for a photo with sailors immediately before his "Mission Accomplished" speech.

On May 1, 2003, Bush became the first sitting president to arrive in an arrested landing in a fixed-wing aircraft on an aircraft carrier when he arrived at the USS Abraham Lincoln in a Lockheed S-3 Viking, dubbed Navy One, as the carrier lay just off the San Diego coast, having returned from combat operations in the Persian Gulf. He posed for photographs with pilots and members of the ship's crew while wearing a flight suit. A few hours later, he gave a speech announcing the end of major combat operations in the Iraq War. Behind and above him hung a banner that said "Mission Accomplished."

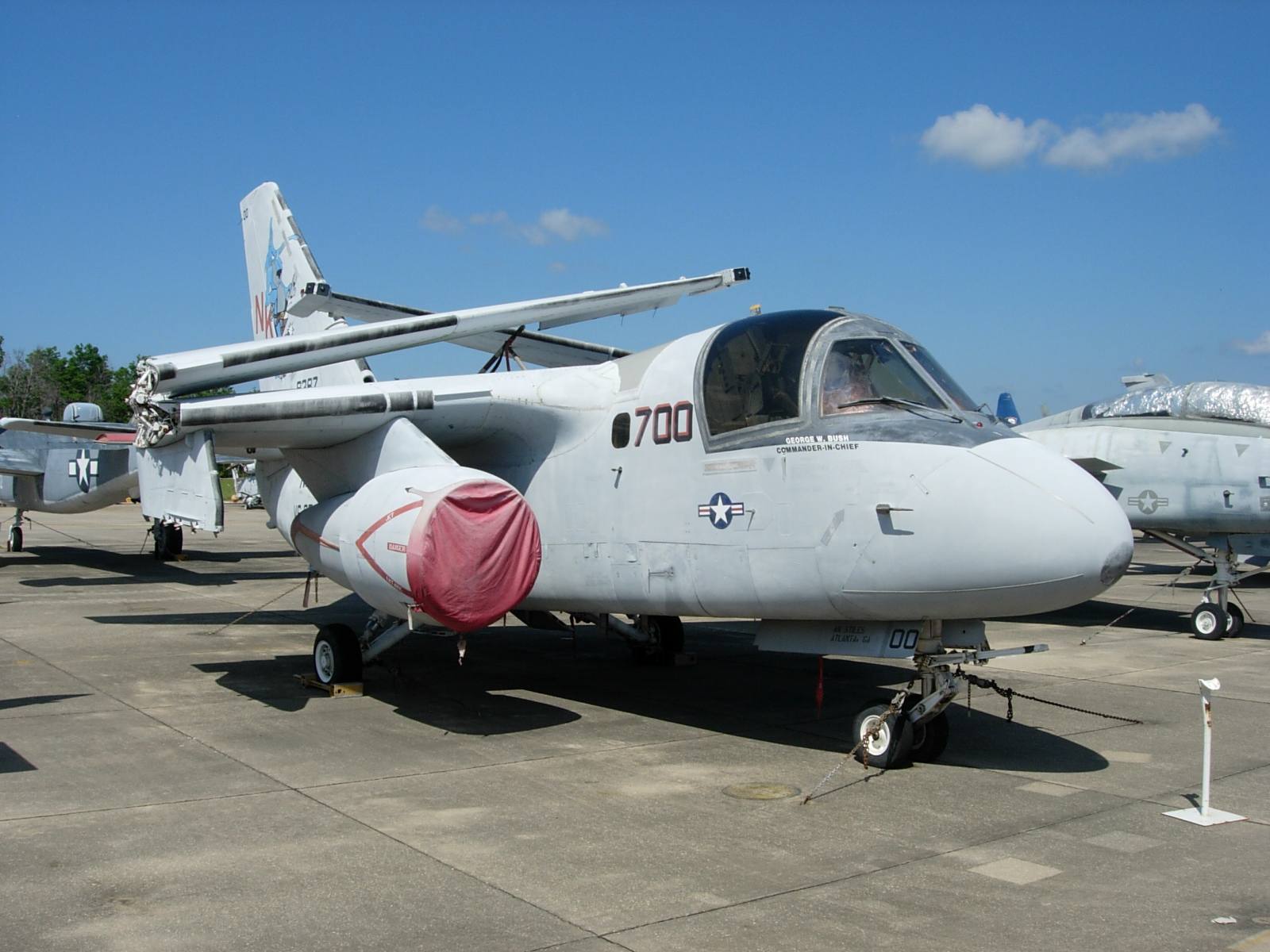
The S-3B Viking "Navy One" was retired and put in display at the National Museum of Naval Aviation.

The S-3 that served as "Navy One" was retired from service and placed on display at the National Museum of Naval Aviation in Pensacola, Florida, on July 17, 2003. The museum makes it clear that Bush was a passenger – not the pilot – of the plane. While Bush trained and served as a jet pilot in the Air National Guard flying F-102 fighter-interceptors, he was never trained to land on a carrier.

In the speech, Bush said, "Major combat operations in Iraq have ended. In the battle of Iraq, the United States and our allies have prevailed." He also said, "We have difficult work to do in Iraq. We are bringing order to parts of that country that remain dangerous." And he added, "Our mission continues...The War on Terror continues, yet it is not endless. We do not know the day of final victory, but we have seen the turning of the tide."

The Lincoln made a scheduled stop in Pearl Harbor shortly before the speech, docked in San Diego after the speech, and returned to her home port in Everett, Washington, on May 6, 2003.

== Criticism ==
The speech and the "Mission Accomplished" banner were swiftly criticized by people who pointed out that the war was hardly over. Media questions about the banner appeared to surprise U.S. government officials, who initially offered different accounts of its origin and its meaning.

Bush was criticized for the historic jet landing on the carrier as an overly theatrical and expensive stunt. For instance, it was pointed out that the carrier was well within range of Bush's helicopter, and that a jet landing was not needed. Originally, White House officials had said the carrier was too far off the California coast for a helicopter landing and a jet would be needed to reach it. On the day of the speech, the Lincoln was only 30 miles (48 km) from shore, but the administration still decided to go ahead with the jet landing. White House spokesman Ari Fleischer admitted that Bush "could have helicoptered, but the plan was already in place. Plus, he wanted to see a landing the way aviators see a landing."

Navy Cmdr. Conrad Chun, a Pentagon spokesman, said the banner referred specifically to the aircraft carrier's 10-month deployment (the longest carrier deployment since the Vietnam War) and not the war itself: "It truly did signify a mission accomplished for the crew."

The White House claimed that the banner was requested by the crew of the ship, who did not have the facilities for producing such a banner. Later, the administration and naval sources said that the banner was the Navy's idea, White House staff members made the banner, and it was hung by Navy sailors. White House spokesman Scott McClellan told CNN, "We took care of the production of it. We have people to do those things. But the Navy actually put it up." According to John Dickerson of Time magazine, the White House later conceded that they hung the banner but still insisted it had been done at the request of the crew members.

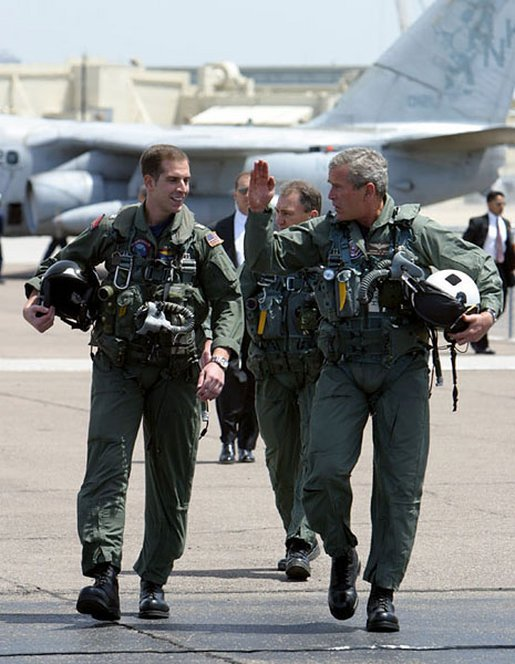
President Bush, with NFO Lt. Ryan Philips, in the flight suit he wore for his televised arrival on the USS Abraham Lincoln

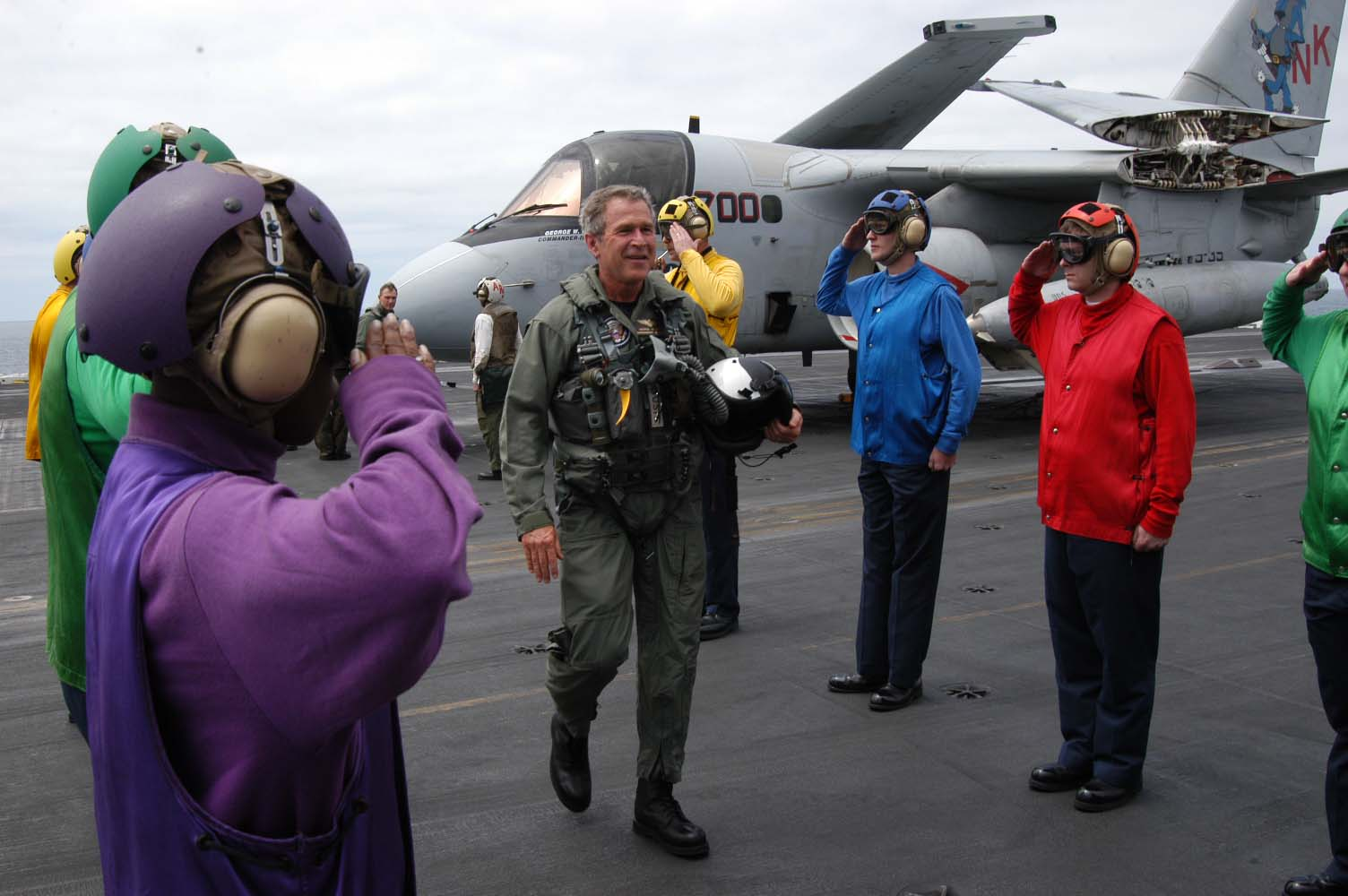
President George W. Bush on the Abraham Lincoln being saluted by the flight deck crew

Subsequently, the White House released a statement saying that the sign and Bush's visit referred to the initial invasion of Iraq.

When he received an advance copy of the speech, U.S. Defense Secretary Donald Rumsfeld took care to remove any use of the phrase "Mission Accomplished" in the speech itself. Later, when journalist Bob Woodward asked him about his changes to the speech, Rumsfeld responded: "I was in Baghdad, and I was given a draft of that thing to look at. And I just died, and I said my God, it's too conclusive. And I fixed it and sent it back... they fixed the speech, but not the sign."

Bush did offer a "Mission Accomplished" message to the troops in Afghanistan at Camp As Sayliyah on June 5, 2003 – about a month after the aircraft carrier speech: "America sent you on a mission to remove a grave threat and to liberate an oppressed people, and that mission has been accomplished."

For critics of the war, the photo-op became a symbol of the Bush administration's unrealistic goals and perceptions of the conflict. Anti-war activists questioned the integrity and realism of Bush's "major combat" statement. The banner came to symbolize the irony of Bush giving a victory speech only a few weeks after the beginning of the fifth longest war in American history.

In a less publicized incident, Rumsfeld also declared an end to major combat operations in Afghanistan on May 1, a few hours before Bush's announcement.

== Subsequent events ==
On April 30, 2008, White House Press Secretary Dana Perino said: "President Bush is well aware that the banner should have been much more specific and said, 'Mission accomplished for these sailors who are on this ship on their mission.' And we have certainly paid a price for not being more specific on that banner." In November 2008, soon after the presidential election in which Democrat Barack Obama was elected to succeed him, Bush indicated that he regretted the use of the banner, telling CNN, "To some, it said, well, 'Bush thinks the war in Iraq is over,' when I didn't think that. It conveyed the wrong message." In January 2009, Bush said, "Clearly, putting 'Mission Accomplished' on an aircraft carrier was a mistake."

In 2010, the "Mission Accomplished" banner was transferred from the National Archives to the collection of the George W. Bush Presidential Center. The banner is not on display.

American deaths in the Iraq War totaled 104 when President Bush gave his Mission Accomplished speech. A further 3,424 Americans were killed in the war through February 2011, when American combat operations there halted.

Iraq War opponents have subsequently used the phrase "mission accomplished" in an ironic sense, while others have non-politically cited it as an example of a general public relations failure. In addition, some mainstream outlets questioned the state of the war with derivatives of this statement. For example, the October 6, 2003, cover of Time featured the headline "Mission Not Accomplished":

On April 14, 2018, President Donald Trump tweeted "Mission Accomplished!" following a US-led airstrike on Syria in response to the use of chemical weapons by the Assad regime. Critics were quick to point out the similarities to Bush's speech.

== See also ==
- US-led intervention in Iraq (2014–2021)
- Dewey Defeats Truman
