= VS-32 =

Sea Control Squadron 32
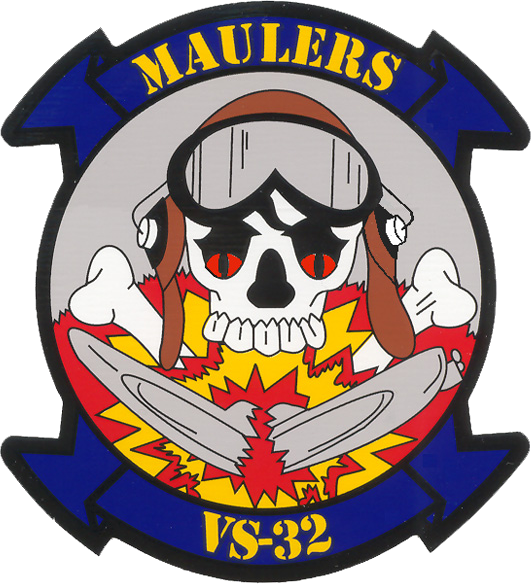
- VS-32 Insignia
- Active: 1949 - 2008
- Country: United States
- Branch: United States Navy
- Role: In-flight refueling Anti-submarine warfare
- Homeport: NAS Jacksonville
- Nickname: "Maulers"
- Aircraft: S-3 Viking

Commanders
- Current commander: CDR Doug Carpenter

VS-32, Sea Control Squadron 32, of the United States Navy, known as the Maulers was established as Composite Squadron 32 (VC-32) on 31 May 1949. It was redesignated Air Anti-Submarine Squadron 32 (VS-32) on 20 April 1950. The squadron initially flew the Grumman TBM-3E/-3W Avenger and was based at Naval Air Station Norfolk, Virginia. In 1951 the squadron moved to Naval Air Station Quonset Point, Rhode Island. VS-32 transitioned to the Grumman S2F-1 Tracker in 1954. The VS community moved in October 1973 to the homeport located at Naval Air Station Cecil Field, Florida. The squadron participated in Operation Desert Storm in 1991. Since the closing of NAS Cecil Field, the East coast VS Squadrons have moved to Naval Air Station Jacksonville in 1999. VS-32 was deactivated effective 30 September 2008 in a deactivation ceremony on 25 September.

== History ==
VS-32 was established as Composite Squadron 32 (VC-32) on 31 May 1949. It was redesignated Air Anti-Submarine Squadron 32 (VS-32) on 20 April 1950. The squadron initially flew the Grumman TBM-3E/-3W Avenger and was based at Naval Air Station Norfolk, Virginia. In 1951 the squadron moved to Naval Air Station Quonset Point, Rhode Island. VS-32 transitioned to the Grumman S2F-1 Tracker in 1954. The VS community moved in October 1973 to the homeport located at Naval Air Station Cecil Field, Florida.

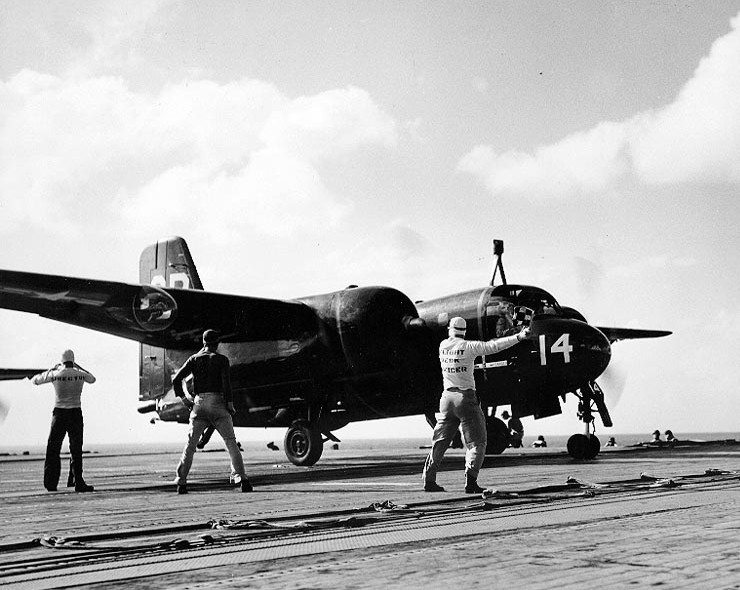
A VS-32 S2F-1 aboard the USS Leyte, 1955.

In early 1975, VS-32 was maintaining S2Fs in Hangar 11 at NAS Cecil Field, Jacksonville. The Commanding Officer (CO) was CDR Ted Simpson, and the Executive Officer (XO), soon to be the CO, was CDR Mauler(Hence, Mauler's Haulers). The Squadron was being repopulated by members that would receive the transition training to the new S-3As. During the course of the year, many members received training on common systems shared with the P-3C Orion at NAS Jacksonville, and also training on systems common to most Naval Aircraft. Many of the squadron members were chosen by the CO and XO for a particular training track.

With a few exceptions, the squadron members were transported to NAS North Island in San Diego (Coronado Island) for transition training. There was a one-week layover at NAS Fallon, Nevada, due to the aircraft being needed for the final evacuation from Vietnam. The transition training was performed by technical representatives from Lockheed (Burbank), Sperry Univac, and other vendors. Classes were also instructed by naval personnel. On-the-job training was with VS-41, which was the Reserve Air Group squadron. The aircraft were S-3As, flown by pilots in training, crewed by TACCOs (Tactical Coordinator Officer), SENSOs (Sensor Operators), and a copilot who was responsible for radar, FLIR, and other supplemental systems. The aircraft were maintained by members of VS-32 with assistance from VS-41 personnel.

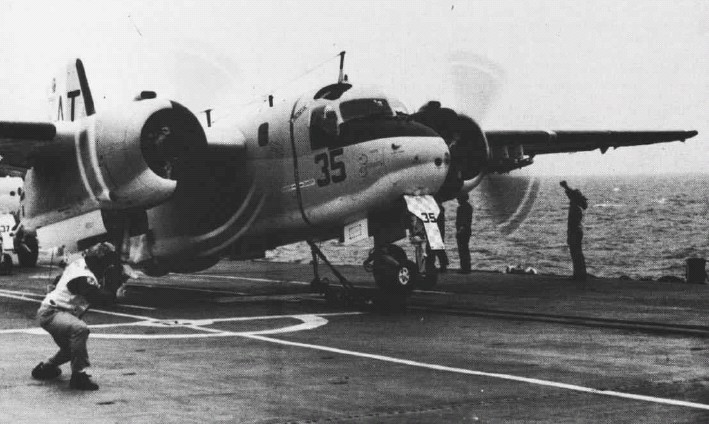
Launch of a VS-32 S-2E from USS Wasp, 1969.

By the end of the summer of 1975, many of the training tracks were complete, and many VS-32 members continued at VS-41 performing day-to-day operations. The first VS-32 S3A was delivered, and subsequently ferried to NAS Cecil Field by VS-32 personnel. The squadron returned to NAS Cecil Field en masse late 1975, and continued to receive new aircraft regularly. Bureau numbers (BUNOs) began with 159700 and ended with 159711. The purpose of having this number of aircraft, atypical for many sea going squadrons, was that one aircraft would essentially be used for parts, rather than a large purchase of spares alone.

In 1976, preparations for working up to the first cruise with the S3 were begun. The squadron sailed on the USS John F. Kennedy out of NS Norfolk, Virginia. During these work-ups, almost the entire squadron personnel, manuals, tools, test equipment, etc. were transported to Norfolk to be loaded onto the Kennedy. After a few weeks of underway training and verification, they would return in entirety to Cecil Field for a short break before returning to the ship.

In August 1976 the squadron began moving members and aircraft to Norfolk for a North Atlantic cruise. From September to 9 December, they deployed to the North Atlantic for flight operations and training for winter operations. There were opportunities to hunt for potentially hostile submarines. There were a number of successful detections, tracking, identification, and recording on audio and digital tape of Soviet and other submarines. In addition there were a few visual sightings. The S-3A was shown to be an accurate platform for Anti-submarine warfare.

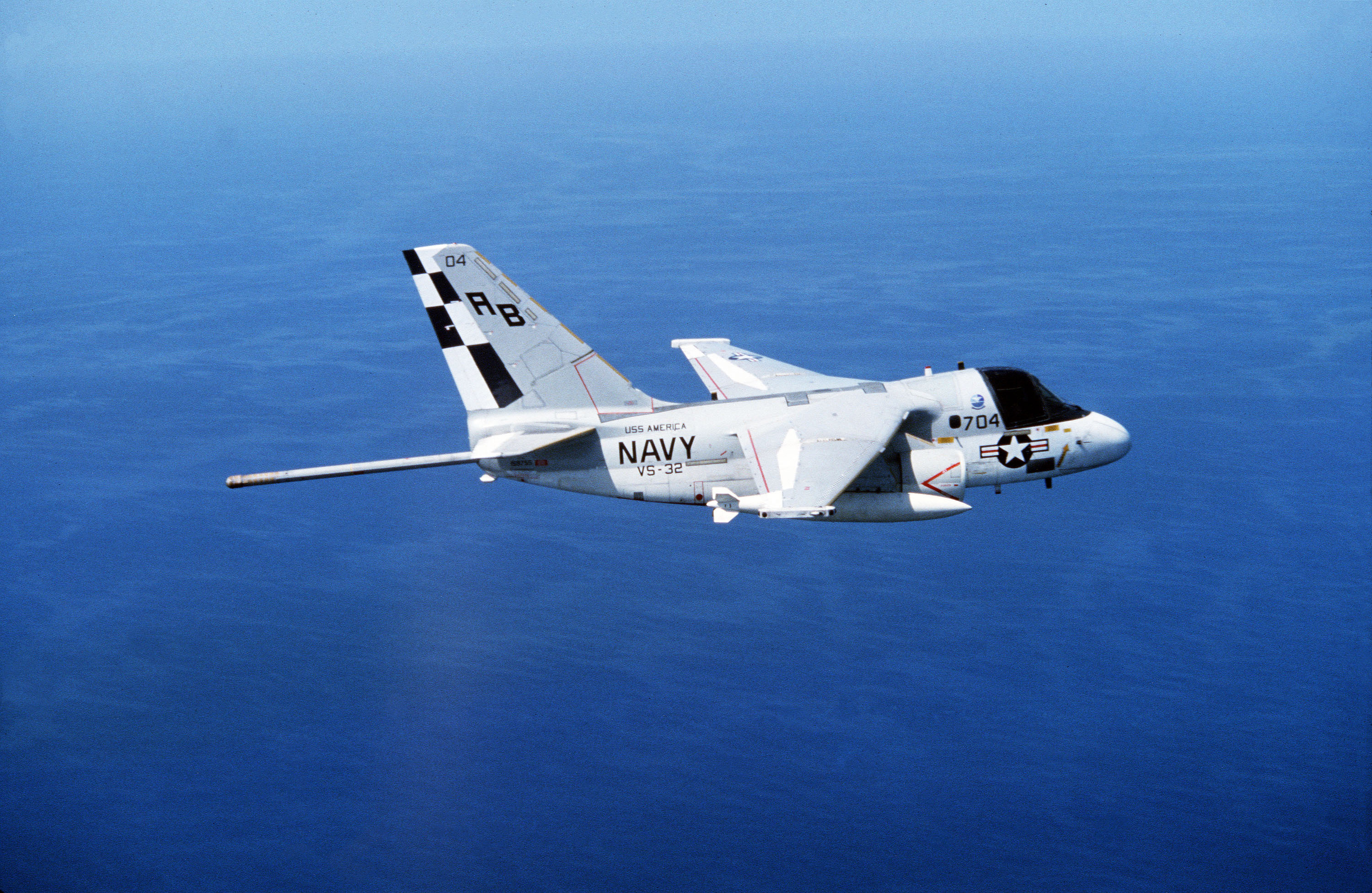
An S-3A of VS-32 assigned to CVW-1 aboard USS America in 1982

There were flight ops north of the Arctic Circle, with flight deck personnel in extreme cold-weather gear. Aircrew members wore poopy suits in case of emergency ejections. During the cruise, the Kennedy visited Edinburgh, Scotland, Wilhelmshaven, Germany, Brest, France, and Portsmouth, England.

VS-32 suffered its first major incident when there was an explosive decompression at night at 24,000 feet (7,300 m). The co-pilot broke his right arm when the top canopy on co-pilot's side blew off. The pilot was blinded in one eye by debris. All radio communication was lost 150 miles from the ship. They made a low pass over the ship, waving wings to indicate that they needed to land. They made a ready deck, and landed successfully with F.O.D. (Foreign Object Damage) in both engines. They returned to the ship with a near-perfect recovery. Pilot's blindness was temporary, and he returned to flight status shortly thereafter.

On 20 February 1991, during Operation Desert Storm, the USS America's VS-32 became the first S-3 squadron to engage, bomb and destroy a hostile vessel–an Iraqi gunboat.

During its final deployment in 2007, VS-32 aircraft flew 960 sorties, which totaled more than 2,200 flight hours, and included more than 950 carrier landings. Squadron VS-32 operated at sea for 180 days with 13 days spent in port.

VS-32 was officially deactivated effective 30 September 2008 in a deactivation ceremony on 25 September 2008.

== See also ==
- History of the United States Navy
- List of inactive United States Navy aircraft squadrons
- List of United States Navy aircraft squadrons
- United States Naval Aviator
