= VX-30 =

Air Test and Evaluation Squadron 30 VX-30
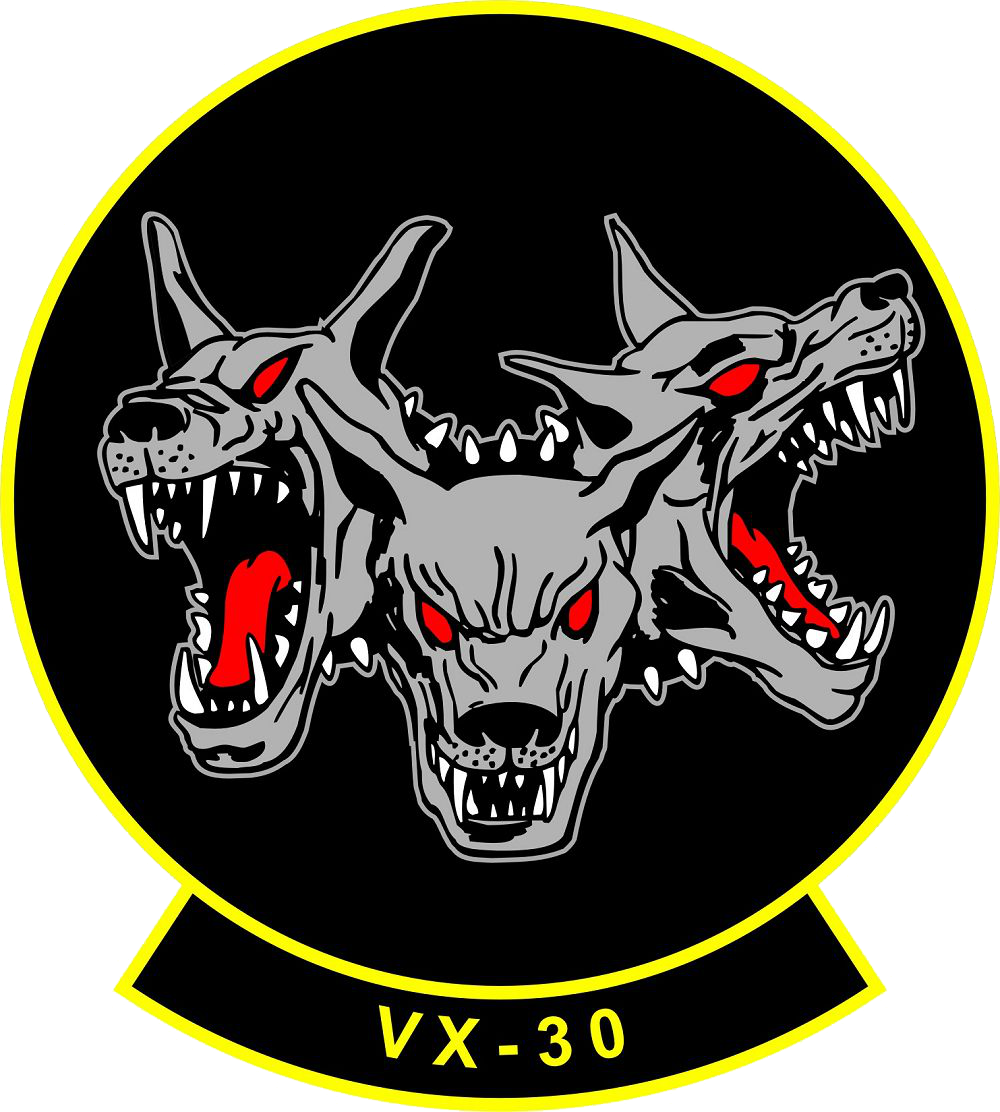
- VX-30 Insignia
- Active: May 1995 - present
- Country: United States
- Branch: United States Navy
- Type: Test & Evaluation
- Role: RDT&E, Surveillance
- Part of: Naval Air Systems Command
- Garrison/HQ: NAS Point Mugu
- Nickname: "Bloodhounds"
- Motto: "Relentless Pursuit of Excellence"
- Colors: Yellow, Black
- Mascot: Cerberus
- Decorations: Chief of Naval Operations Aviation Safety Award (2010)

Commanders
- Commanding officer: CDR Devin Holmes
- Chief test pilot: CDR Barry Carmody
- Executive officer: CDR Gary Redman

Aircraft flown
- Fighter: F-4 Phantom (retired) F-14 Tomcat (retired) F/A-18 Hornet (retired)
- Reconnaissance: E-2D Hawkeye, P-8 Poseidon, P-3 Orion, S-3 Viking (retired)
- Transport: C-130, NC-20G

Air Test and Evaluation Squadron 30 (AIRTEVRON THREE ZERO or VX-30), nicknamed The Bloodhounds) is a United States Navy air test and evaluation squadron based at Naval Air Station Point Mugu, California. Using the tail code BH, the squadron flies the P-8 Poseidon, E-2D Hawkeye, Lockheed P-3 Orion, Gulfstream NC-20G, and the Lockheed C-130 Hercules aircraft. The VX-30 Bloodhounds provide support to the United States Navy's Sea Test Range off the shores of central California.

== History ==
Established as the Naval Weapons Test Squadron Point Mugu on 8 May 1995, the squadron was redesignated Air Test and Evaluation Squadron THREE ZERO (VX-30) in May 2002. Today, VX-30 is the principal naval flight and ground test unit for all Point Mugu Naval Air Systems Command aircraft and aircraft functions, including logistics and training support.

The VX-30 logo was designed by Ralph R. Abel, Jr., GS Federal Civil Service, a Graphic Technical Illustrator for VX-9 Detachment, Naval Base Ventura County (NBVC), Point Mugu requested by Lt. Cmdr Mark Thomas VX-30 Maintenance Officer who had the idea to use Cerberus, the guardian of the gates of Hades in Greek mythology in 2003. The design was based on Mr. Abel's dog, a rottweiler.

== Aircraft Flown ==
=== Current aircraft ===
VX-30 is one of the most diverse squadrons in the Navy today, as its flight line encompasses multiple Naval Aviation platforms. Each one of these platforms is used in various Research Development, Test and Evaluation (RDT&E) of current and future weapons systems, which are being tested at Naval Air Warfare Center, Weapons Division both at Point Mugu and China Lake.

==== C-130 / KC-130 Hercules ====
VX-30 uses the C-130 and KC-130 extensively as an aerial refueling platform for units that are conducting tests on the Sea Test Range, as well as for surveillance and clearance on during hazardous operations that are being conducted on the range as well. To this date, the squadron flies the oldest C-130s in active military history, dating back to 1957.

==== P-3 Orion ====
The squadron's most used aircraft is the P-3 Orion. These aircraft are used in conjunction with the testing on the Sea Test Range for surveillance and clearance, as well as providing telemetry data during missile testing. VX-30 also flies two of the fleet's only "Billboard" NP-3Ds, a P-3A that has been upgraded with a large billboard-esqe radar, that can provide over-the-horizon radar capabilities. The NP-3D aircraft were also used to support five NASA Space Shuttle missions using the Cast Glance optical system to monitor re-entry.

==== E-2D Advanced Hawkeye ====
The newest aircraft to the squadron's inventory, the E-2D arrived in 2022 for mission-system testing. The aircraft's arrival streamlined Navy RDT&E efforts and facilitated the overall Naval Test Wing Pacific vision of integrated Carrier Air Wing testing.

==== NC-20G ====
In 2023, the NC-20G arrived at VX-30. This aircraft is a heavily modified C-20/GIV that provides range support. Specifically, the aircraft hosts the squadron's Cast Glance capability.

==== S-3 Viking ====
First appearing in early 2009, the S-3 Vikings were used for their surveillance capabilities on the Sea Test Range. Because of their agility and speed, they were able to much more quickly identify and locate various vessels which may impact the operations being conducted. In November 2010, VX-30 helped to celebrate the Centennial of Naval Aviation by sporting an S-3 with a paint scheme that dates back to aircraft that were flying during the Battle of Midway.

In January 2016, the Navy retired the S-3 Viking from service completely, and thus, the S-3 is no longer flown by VX-30, or any other command in the US Navy.

==== P-8 Poseidon ====
In June 2026, VX-30 announced the arrival of its first Boeing P-8 Poseidon maritime patrol aircraft at Point Mugu.

== Gallery ==
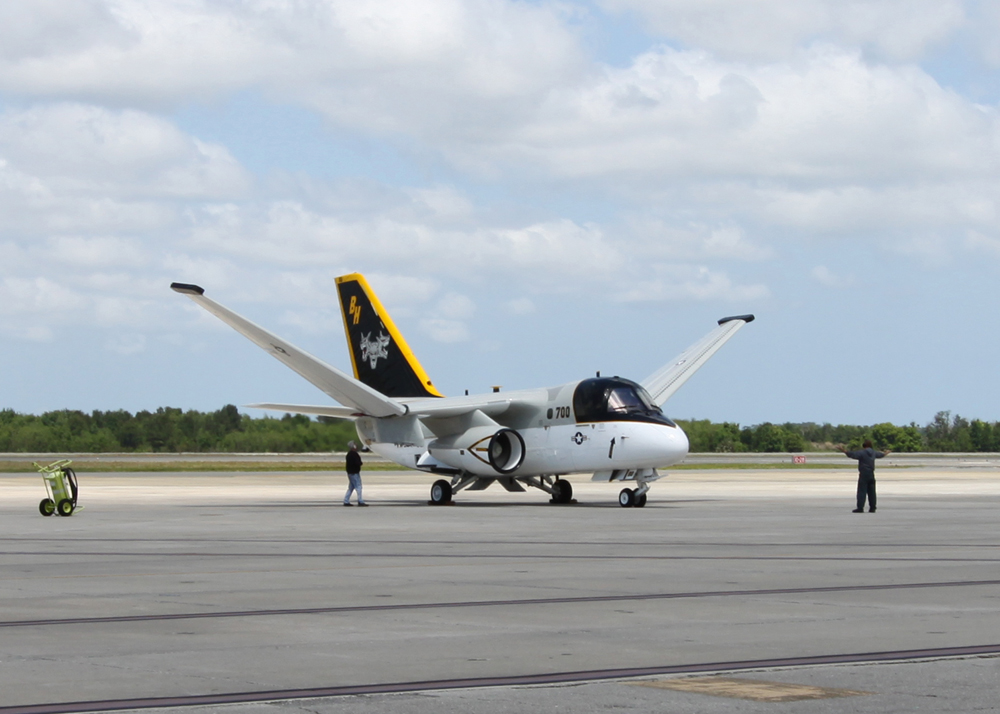
S-3B Viking

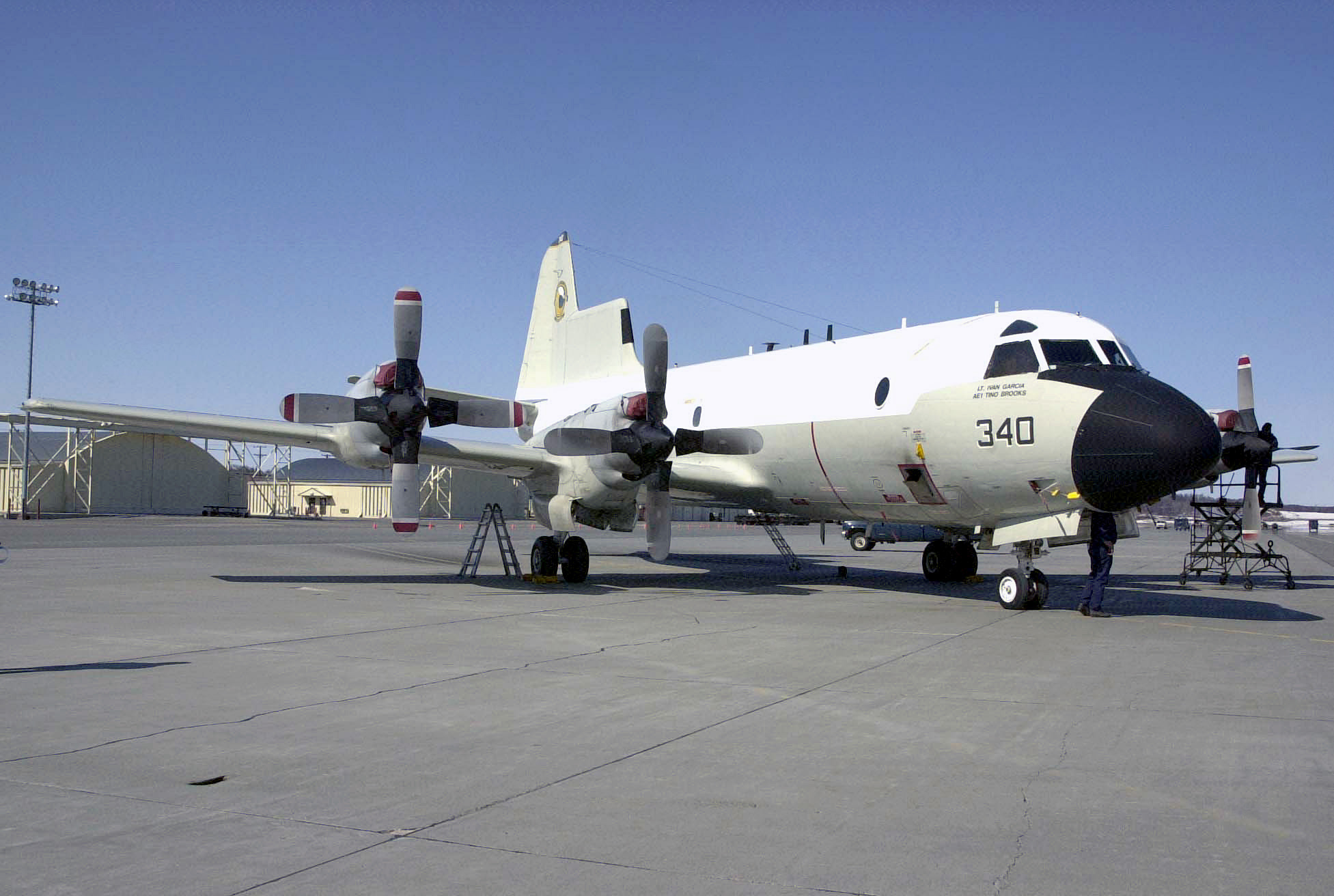
NP-3D Orion

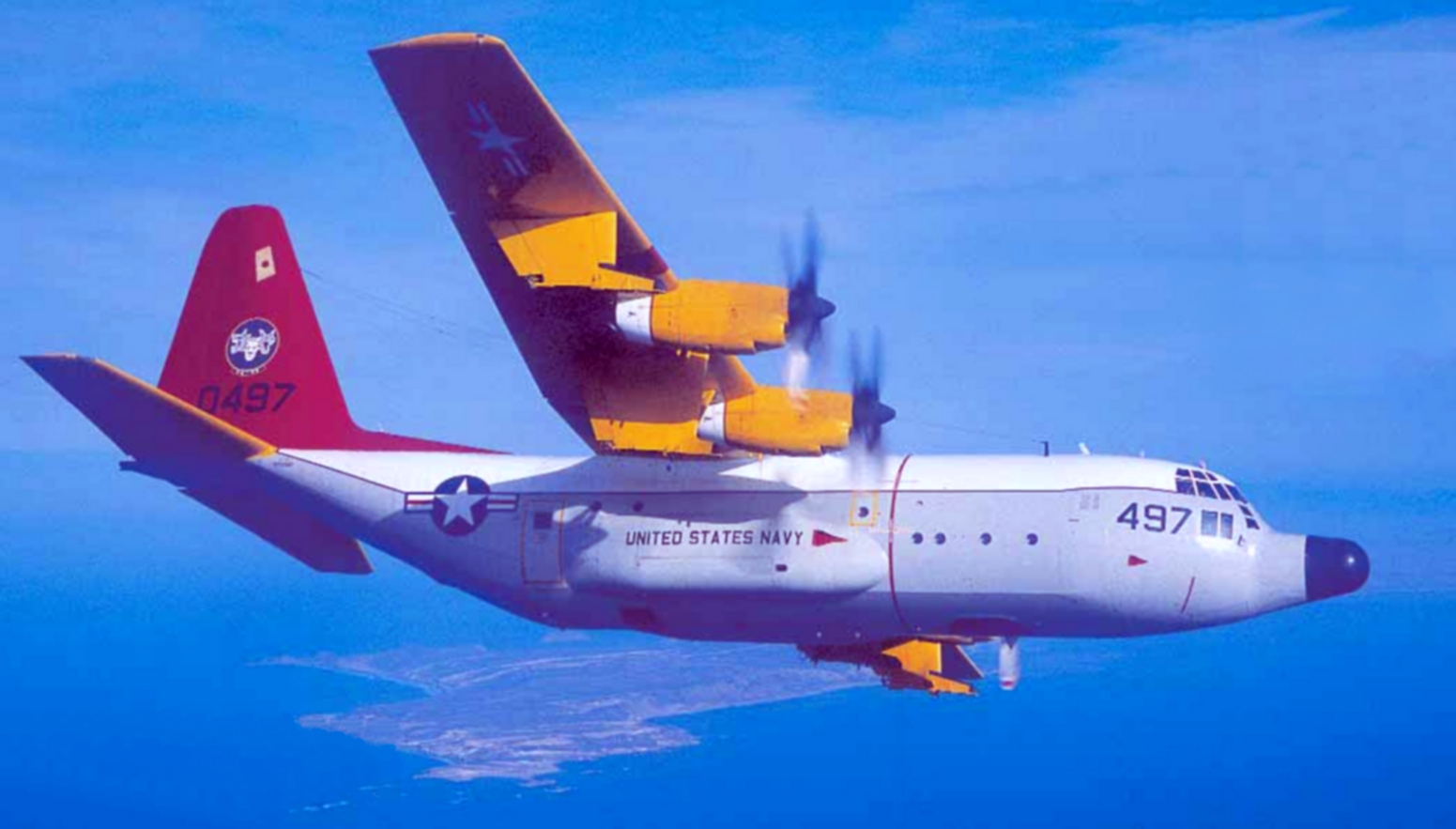
This DC-130A was retired in 2007

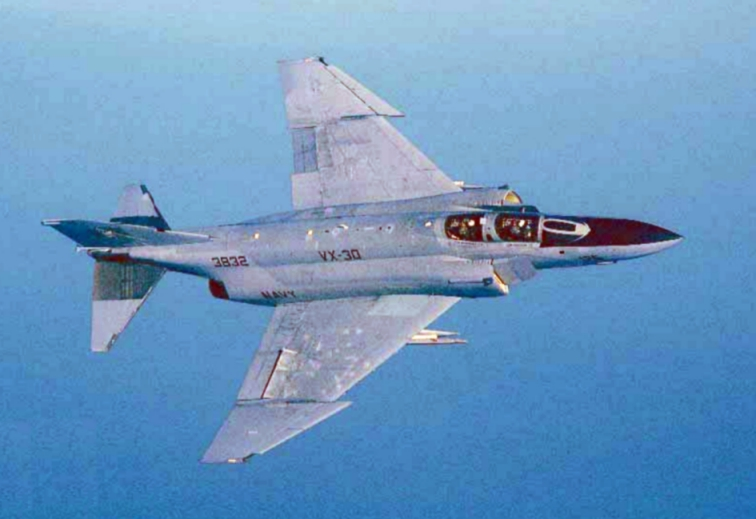
A QF-4S in flight, 2004

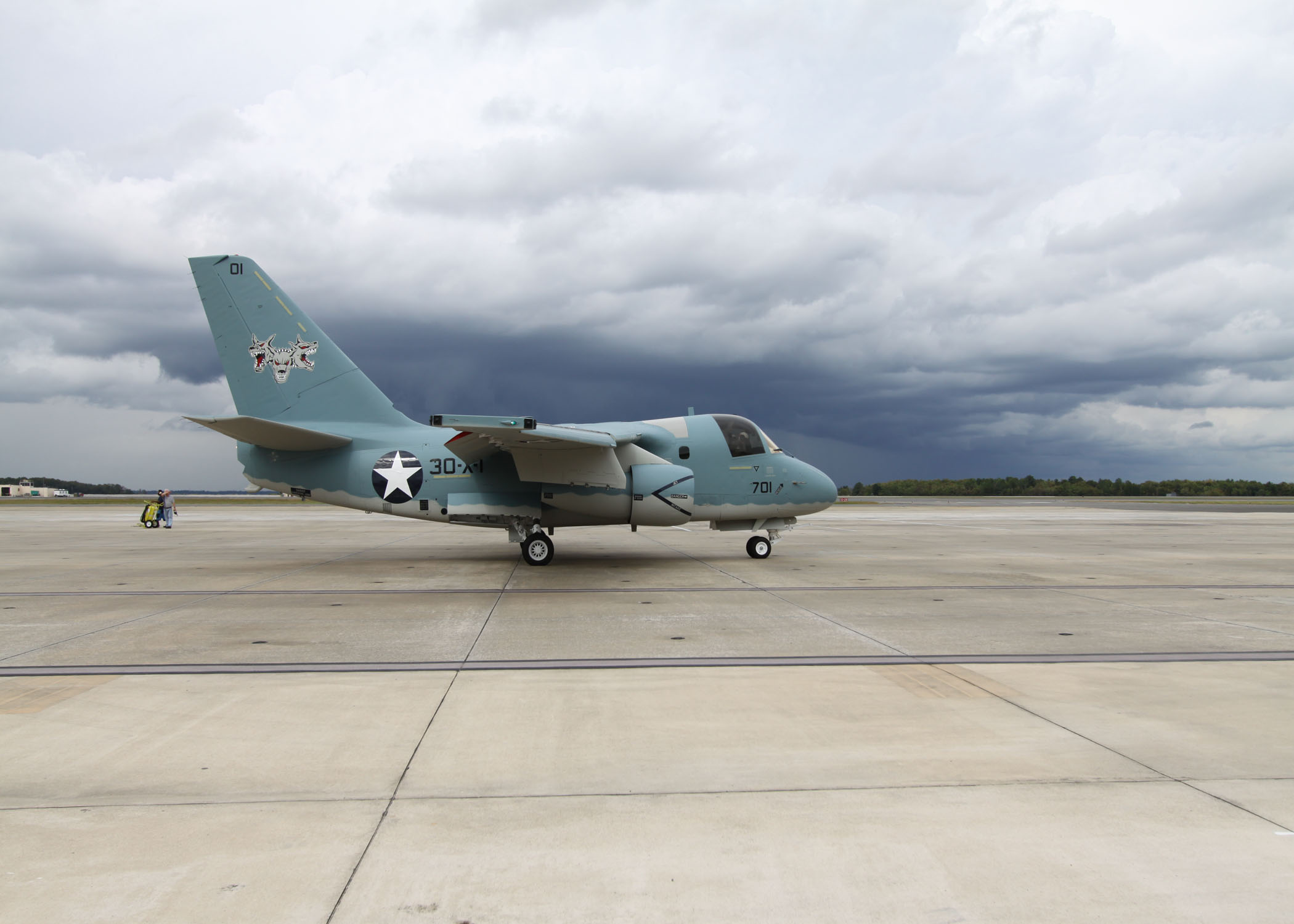
Photo of S-3B with 1940's paint scheme
