= VS-22 =

Sea Control Squadron 22
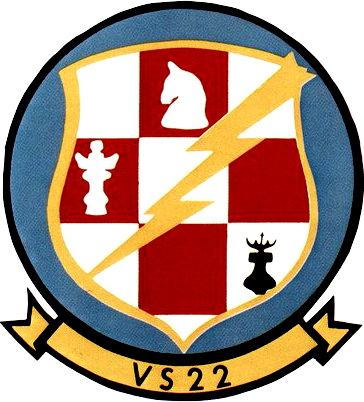
- VS-22 insignia
- Active: 18 May 1960 – 31 March 2009
- Country: United States
- Branch: United States Navy
- Role: Anti-submarine warfare Anti-surface warfare In-flight refueling
- Homeport: NAS Jacksonville
- Nicknames: "Checkmates", "Vidars"
- Aircraft: Lockheed S-3B Viking

Sea Control Squadron 22 (VS-22) Checkmates was a carrier-based United States Navy squadron based out of Naval Air Station Jacksonville in Florida. The squadron flew the Lockheed S-3B Viking and their mission was mining, undersea and surface warfare, electronic reconnaissance and analysis, over the horizon targeting, and aerial refueling. The squadron was last attached to Carrier Air Wing Seventeen (CVW-17) and was the last squadron flying the Viking. VS-22 was disestablished in a ceremony at NAS Jacksonville on 29 January 2009, and officially on 31 March 2009.

== History ==
Two distinct squadrons have been designated VS-22. The second of these is the main subject of this article. Officially, the US Navy does not recognize a direct lineage with disestablished squadrons if a new squadron is formed with the same designation. Often, the new squadron will assume the nickname, insignia, and traditions of the earlier squadrons.

=== First VS-22, 1945-1956 ===
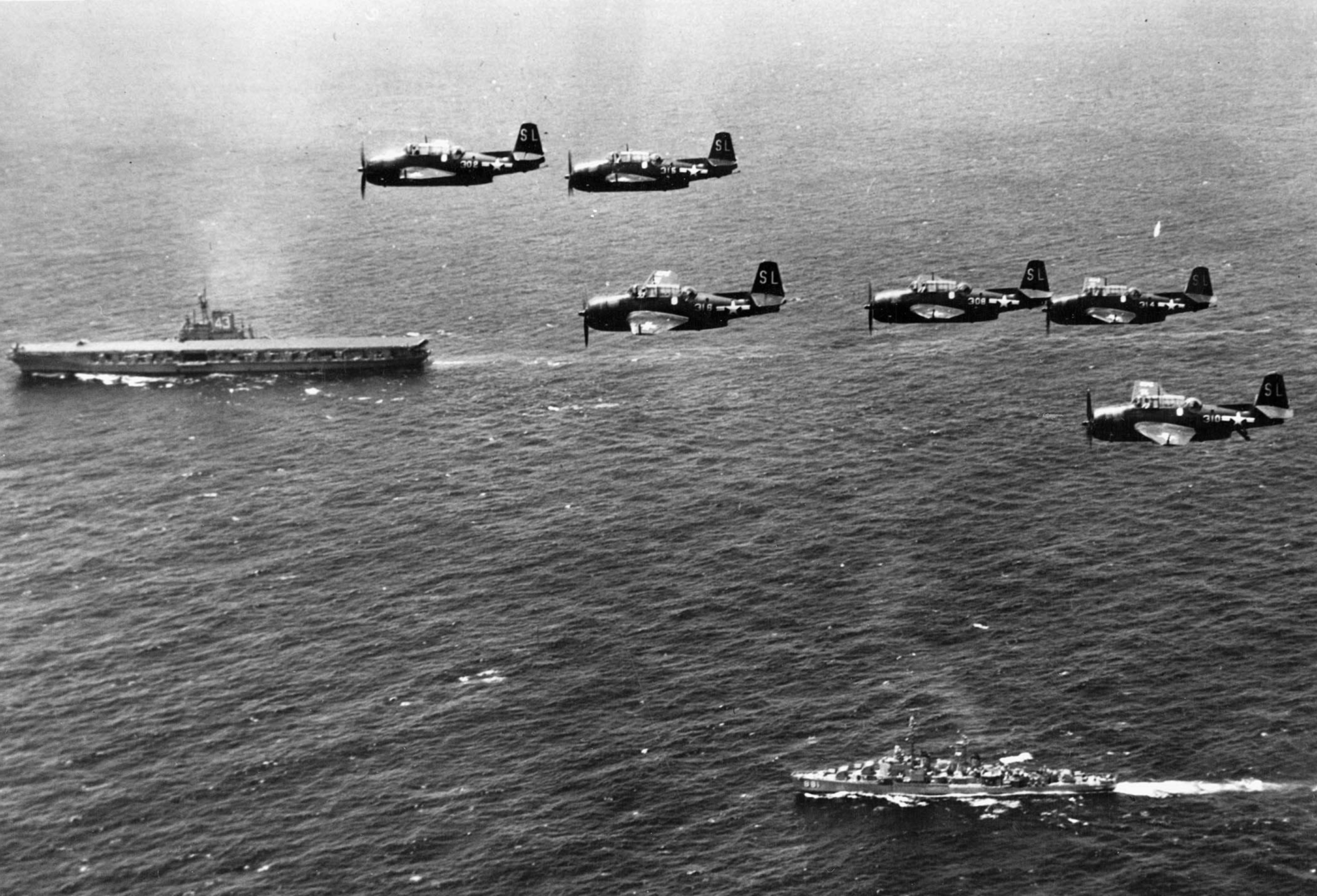
Six U.S. Navy Grumman TBM-3E Avenger anti-submarine aircraft of Composite Squadron VC-22 Checkmates flying over the Mediterranean Sea.

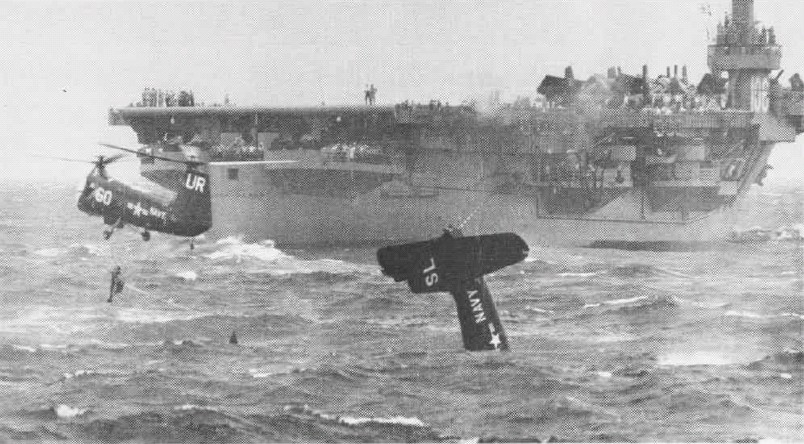
Crash of a VS-22 Grumman AF Guardian from USS Block Island in 1953.

The original VS-22 was established as torpedo squadron VT-42 on 19 June 1945 at NAS Brunswick, Maine (USA), also named "Checkmates". It was equipped with the Grumman TBM-3E/-3W/-3S Avenger. It was redesignated attack squadron VA-2E on 15 November 1946 at NAS Oceana, Virginia, and to composite squadron VC-22 on 15 September 1948. Finally the squadron became anti-submarine squadron VS-22 on 20 April 1950 at NAS Norfolk, Virginia. In the early 1950s the squadron transitioned to the Grumman AF-2S/-2W Guardian and was identified by the tail code "SL". The squadron served aboard the following carriers: USS Block Island, USS Kula Gulf, USS Salerno Bay, USS Siboney, USS Sicily, USS Palau, USS Antietam, USS Tarawa, USS Valley Forge, USS Philippine Sea, USS Coral Sea, USS Saipan, USS Midway, USS Franklin D. Roosevelt and the USS Wright. The first VS-22 was disestablished at NAS Quonset Point on 1 June 1956. The majority of manpower, material and planes were reassigned to VS-27 at NAS Norfolk.

=== Second VS-22, 1960-2009 ===
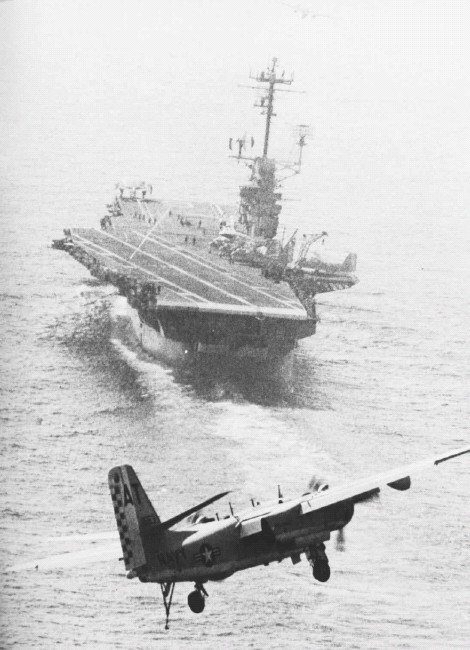
A VS-22 S-2E approaching USS Essex in 1967

A new anti-submarine squadron VS-22 was established at NAS Quonset Point, Rhode Island (USA), on 18 May 1960. From 1960 to 1976, the Checkmates flew the Grumman S-2 Tracker, better known as "Stoof" from its pre-1962 designation "S2F". VS-22 was assigned to Carrier Anti-Submarine Air Group 54 (CVSG-54) at NAS Quonset Point and operated from Essex-class anti-submarine carriers, mostly in the Atlantic Ocean and the Mediterranean Sea:
USS Lake Champlain, June 1960 - May 1965;
USS Essex, June 1967 - August 1967;
USS Wasp, March 1969 - November 1971;
USS Intrepid, March 1972 (as part of CVSG-56).

Besides the typical submarine hunting role for which the aircraft was designed, the Checkmates held a significant role in the United States space program. Naval aviator Alan B. Shepard's Freedom 7 spacecraft, the United States' first crewed spacecraft, was tracked and located by VS-22 on 5 May 1961. In August 1965, while embarked on USS Lake Champlain, VS-22 recovered Gemini 5 astronauts Gordon Cooper and Pete Conrad. Finally, VS-22 was engaged in the recovery of Apollo 7 astronauts while deployed aboard USS Essex.

=== 1970s-80s ===
Jet transitions started in the summer of 1974 with pilots training in Rockwell T-2C Buckeyes and Douglas TA-4J Skyhawks at NAS Meridian, Mississippi, making VS-22 the first east coast based S-3A squadron. With the retirement of the anti-submarine carriers the anti-submarine squadrons were integrated into the former attack carrier air wings. From 1976 to 2001 VS-22 was assigned to Carrier Air Wing Three (CVW-3). Between 1976 and 1980 VS-22 made four deployments aboard the USS Saratoga. After the Saratoga went to drydock in September 1980, CVW-3 transitioned to deployments aboard the USS John F. Kennedy. The squadron transitioned to the S-3B in 1989.

=== 1990s ===
This was followed by seven cruises aboard USS John F. Kennedy, including participation in Operation Desert Shield and Operation Desert Storm in 1990/91. Operation "Desert Storm" commenced on 17 January 1991. VS-22 aircrews flew over 1100 combat hours and 324 combat sorties in direct support of the coalition forces. Target information gleaned by VS-22 aircraft played a major role in the suppression of enemy air defences during the first days of Desert Storm. From 22 January 1991 until the cease-fire on 28 February 1991, the Checkmates flew in every CVW-3 strike against Iraq . VS-22 was also employed in support of CJTF-4 counter narcotics operations during the last part of 1991 through the first part of 1992 earned the Checkmates the "Joint Meritorious Unit Award" for locating over 1500 contacts, confirming 50 as suspected offenders. After a long pre-deployment work-up schedule, VS-22 embarked on the carrier USS John F. Kennedy in October 1992. Concentrating on multi-national Mediterranean and Adriatic Sea exercises during the first half of deployment, VS-22 provided initial in-flight refueling training for Egyptian Air Force Mirage 2000 pilots and practiced ASW skills while leading over 40 multi-national, integrated and air wing exercise strikes against NATO ships. Later VS-22 participated in Operations Provide Comfort and Provide Promise, providing radar locating and command and control information. In February 1994, VS-22 joined CVW-3 and USS Dwight D. Eisenhower. It was at this time that United States Congress passed laws permitting the embarkation of women in combat units. VS-22 had the distinction of being the first S-3B command to be assigned female sailors. Additionally, VS-22 orchestrated the addition of the AGM-65F Maverick into the S-3B capabilities enabling control of SLAM/Walleye. On 16 April 1995, VS-22 returned from their Mediterranean deployment on board Dwight D. Eisenhower. On 26 November 1996, VS-22 deployed on board USS Theodore Roosevelt to the Mediterranean and the North Persian Gulf. VS-22 participated in operations "Southern Watch" and "Decisive Endeavor" as well as numerous other joint exercises. On 21 April 1997, in the Eastern Mediterranean, the Checkmates became the first S-3B squadron to launch the AGM-65F Infrared Maverick missile while deployed. VS-22 next deployed on board USS Enterprise. VS-22 participated in various exercises such as Operation Desert Fox, Juniper Stallion and Noble Anvil, mostly providing electronic warfare support.

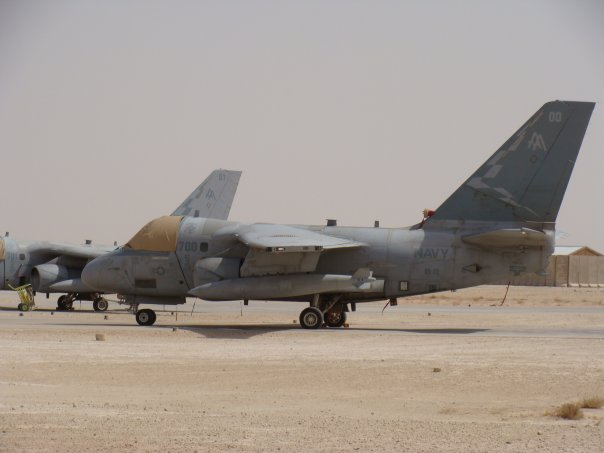
VS-22's S-3B, callsign "Vidar 700", deployed to Al Asad, Iraq

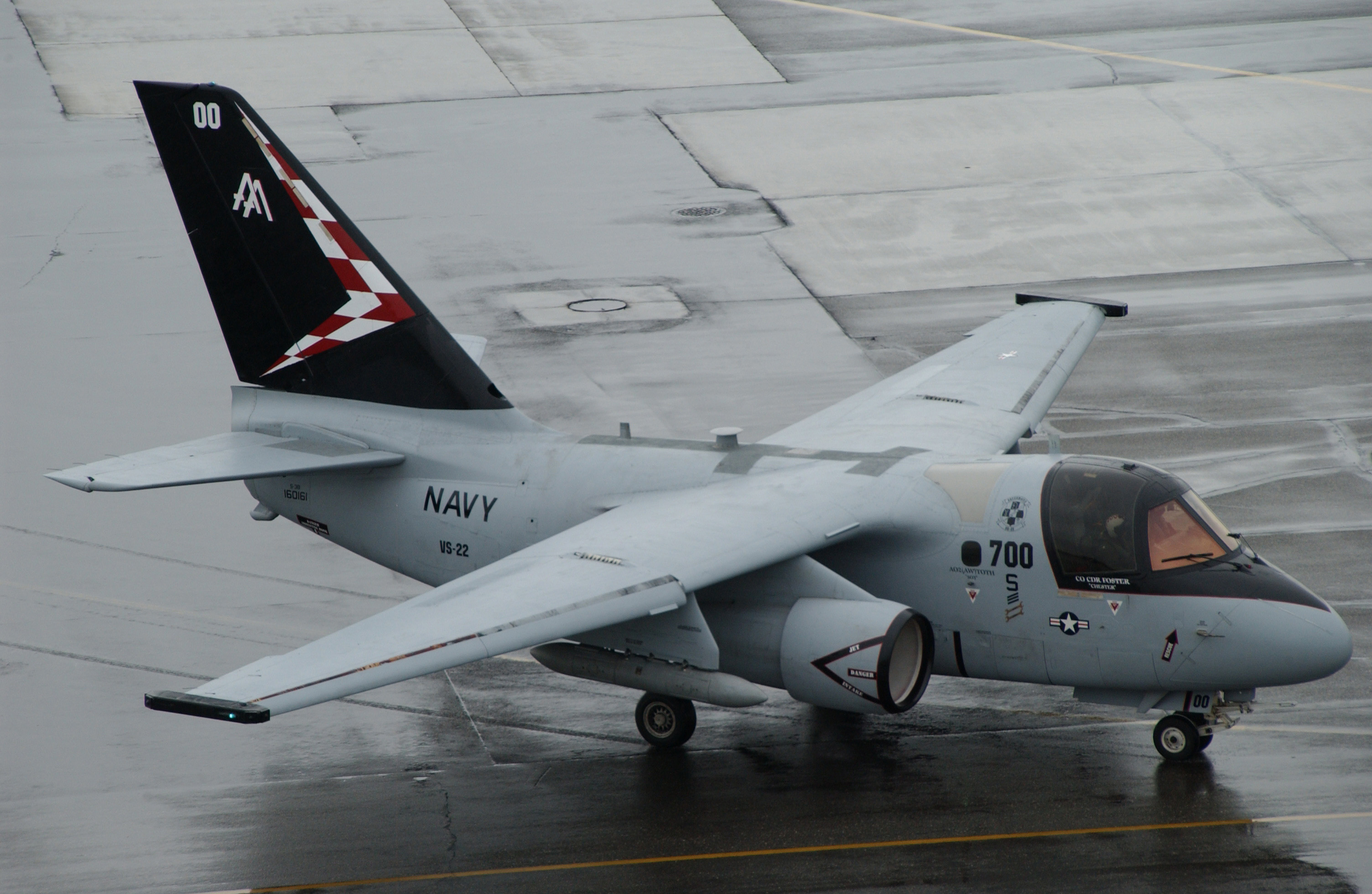
A S-3B from VS-22 at Eielson Air Force Base during Exercise Red Flag - Alaska, July 2007.

=== 2000s ===
In November 2000 VS-22 and CVW-3 embarked on USS Harry S. Truman's maiden deployment. On 16 February 2001, CVW-3 participated in strikes against Iraq as a part of Operation Southern Watch. The Checkmates deployed for a second time with the Truman in December 2002, this time participating in Operations Enduring Freedom and Iraqi Freedom, launching missions from the Eastern Mediterranean. October 2004 saw VS-22 deploying with CVW-3 and Harry S. Truman for the last time. VS-22 flew 1170 sorties and 3220 hours in support of "Operation Iraqi Freedom", patrolling the oil infrastructure in the Persian Gulf during "Operation Sea Dragon II" missions.

VS-22 deployed in 2006 on USS George Washington, being assigned to CVW-17. VS-22 last carrier embark was from 7 April to 27 May 2008, aboard George Washington for the transit from Norfolk around South America to San Diego, California. Less than a week after returning from GW, VS-22 was ordered to deploy to Iraq as a land based squadron. The squadron operated from Al Asad Air Base in Al Anbar Province until their return to NAS Jacksonville on 15 December 2008. VS-22 was the last squadron flying the Viking, and was disestablished on 29 January 2009.

== See also ==
- List of United States Navy aircraft squadrons
- United States Naval Aviator
- Naval Flight Officer
