= Lockheed S-3 Viking =

Carrier-based anti-submarine and aerial refueling aircraft

S-3 Viking
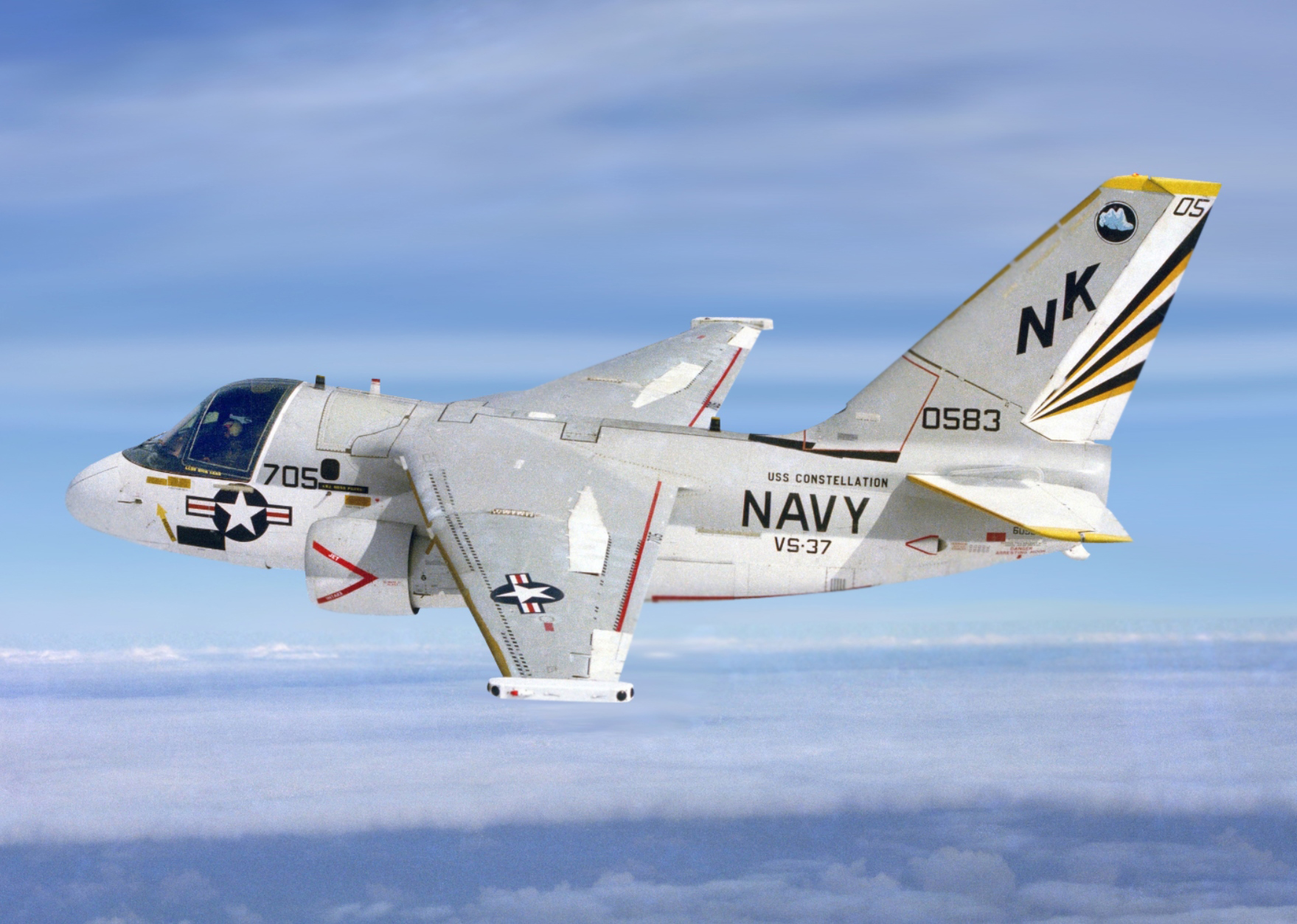
- An S-3A Viking from ASW squadron VS-37 Sawbucks

General information
- Type: Carrier-based anti-submarine warfare aircraft
- National origin: United States
- Manufacturer: Lockheed Corporation
- Primary users: United States Navy NASA
- Number built: 188

History
- Manufactured: 1974–1978
- Introduction date: 20 February 1974
- First flight: 21 January 1972
- Retired: 2016 (Navy); 2021 (NASA)
- Variants: Lockheed ES-3 Shadow, Lockheed KS-3

The Lockheed S-3 Viking is a four-crew, twin-engine turbofan-powered subsonic anti-submarine jet aircraft designed and produced by the American aerospace manufacturer Lockheed Corporation. Because of its characteristic sound, it was nicknamed the "War Hoover" after the vacuum cleaner brand.

The S-3 was developed in response to the VSX program conducted by the U.S. Navy (USN) to procure a successor anti-submarine warfare (ASW) aircraft to the Grumman S-2 Tracker. It was designed, with assistance from Ling-Temco-Vought (LTV), to be a carrier-based, subsonic, all-weather, long-range, multi-mission aircraft.

On 21 January 1972, the prototype YS-3A performed the type's maiden flight. Upon entering regular service during February 1974, it proved to be a reliable workhorse. In the ASW role, the S-3 carried automated weapons and in-flight refueling gear. Further variants, such as the ES-3A Shadow carrier-based electronic intelligence (ELINT) platform, and the US-3A carrier-based utility and cargo transport, arrived during the 1980s and 1990s. In the late 1990s, the S-3B's mission focus shifted to surface warfare and aerial refueling a carrier battle group. It saw combat during the Gulf War of the early 1990s, the Yugoslav Wars of the mid-to-late 1990s, and the War in Afghanistan during the 2000s.

The S-3 was removed from front-line fleet service aboard aircraft carriers in January 2009, its missions having been taken over by the P-3C Orion, P-8 Poseidon, SH-60 Seahawk, and F/A-18E/F Super Hornet. For more than a decade after that, some S-3s were flown by Air Test and Evaluation Squadron Thirty (VX-30) at Naval Base Ventura County / NAS Point Mugu, California, for range clearance and surveillance operations at the NAVAIR Point Mugu Range. These final examples in U.S. Navy service were retired in early 2016. The last operational S-3 was used by the National Aeronautics and Space Administration (NASA) at its Glenn Research Center until NASA retired it in mid-2021. Most retired S-3s were placed into storage while options for their future were investigated. During the 2010s, Lockheed Martin proposed to refurbish them for carrier onboard delivery. The Republic of Korea Navy also had plans to operate revived S-3s for ASW; these plans were cancelled in 2017.

== Development ==
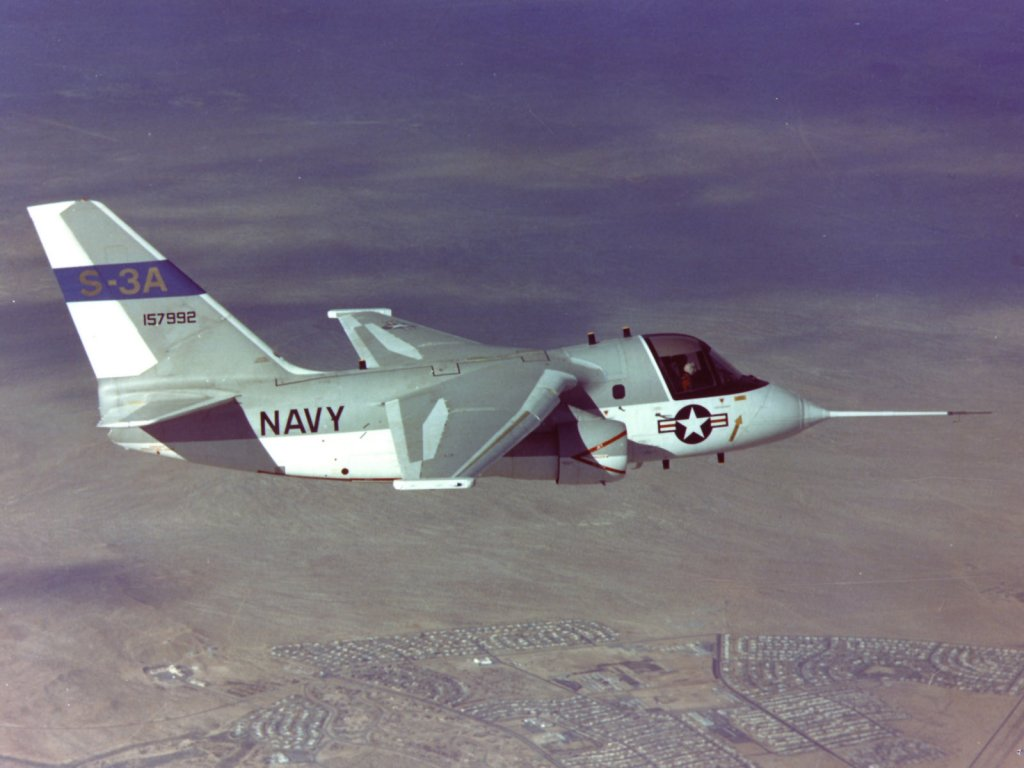
YS-3A prototype

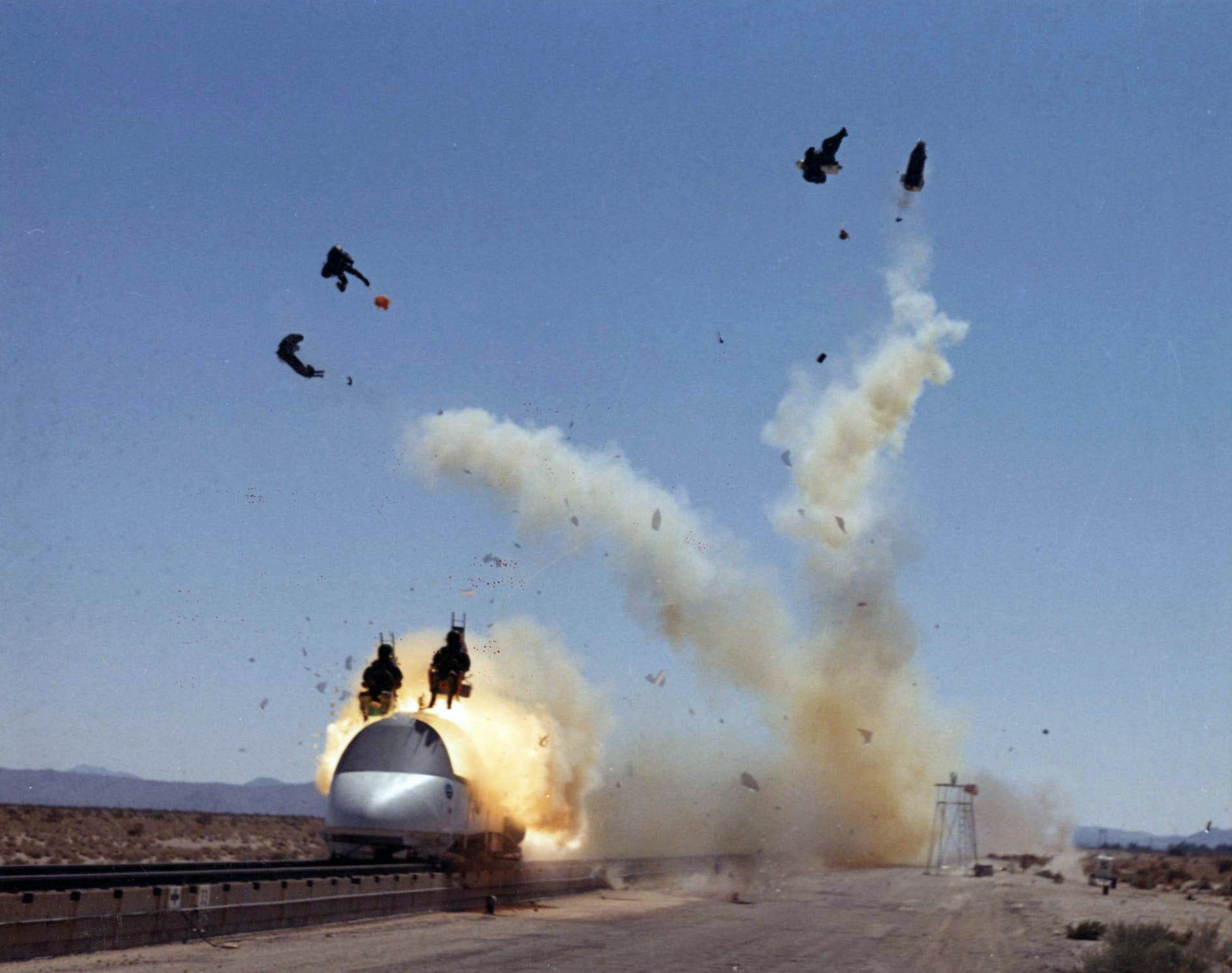
S-3 escape system testing

In the mid-1960s, the United States Navy (USN) formulated the VSX (Heavier-than-air, Anti-submarine, Experimental) requirement, which sought a dedicated anti-submarine aircraft capable of flying off of its aircraft carriers as a replacement for its existing inventory of piston-engined Grumman S-2 Trackers. The service issued a request for proposals to industry. During August 1968, a team led by Lockheed, as well as a rival team comprising Convair and Grumman, were requested to further develop their proposals to meet this requirement.

At this stage, Lockheed recognised that it had little experience in designing carrier based aircraft, thus the company reached out to the industrial conglomerate Ling-Temco-Vought (LTV), which joined the team. LTV assumed responsibility for the design of various elements of the airframe, such as the folding wings and tail, the engine nacelles, and the landing gear, some of which had been derived from the earlier LTV A-7 Corsair II and Vought F-8 Crusader. Sperry Univac Federal Systems was assigned the task of developing the aircraft's onboard computers which integrated input from sensors and sonobuoys.

On 4 August 1969, Lockheed's design was selected as the winner of the VSX contest; an order for eight prototypes, designated YS-3A, was promptly received by the company. On 21 January 1972, the first prototype performed its maiden flight in the hands of military test pilot John Christiansen. Flight testing proceeded quickly with no major issues; two years later, the S-3 entered operational service with the U.S. Navy. During the type's production run, which ran from 1974 to 1978, a total of 186 S-3As were constructed. The majority of the surviving S-3As were later upgraded to the improved S-3B variant, while 16 aircraft were also converted into ES-3A Shadow electronic intelligence (ELINT) collection aircraft.

== Design ==
The Lockheed S-3 Viking is a conventional monoplane with a cantilever shoulder wing, very slightly swept with a leading edge angle of 15° and an almost straight trailing edge. Its twin GE TF-34 high-bypass turbofan engines mounted in nacelles under the wings provide excellent fuel efficiency, providing the Viking with the required long range and endurance, while also maintaining relatively docile engine-out characteristics.

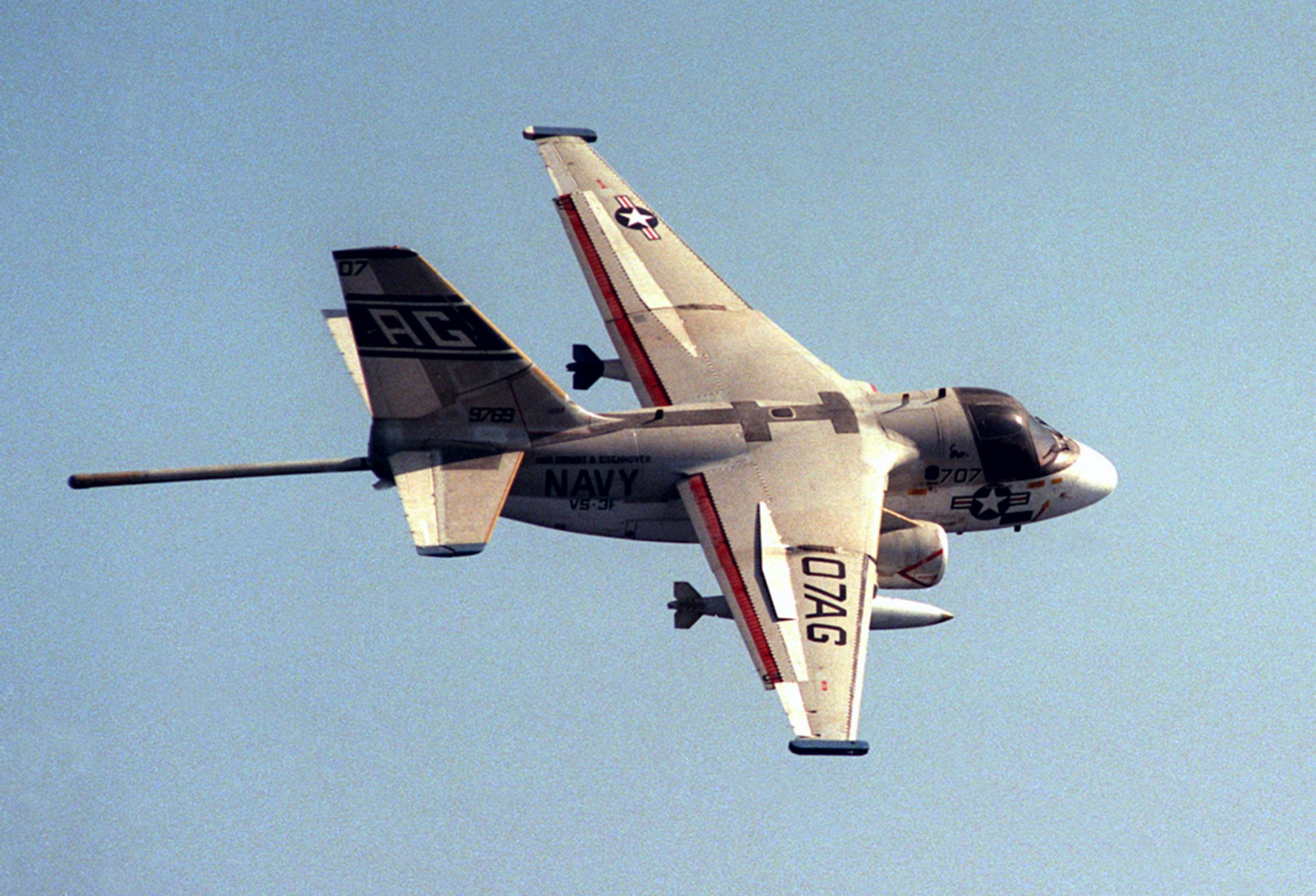
S-3A with extended MAD-sensor

The aircraft can seat four crew members (three officers and one enlisted) with pilot and copilot/tactical coordinator (COTAC) in the front of the cockpit and the tactical coordinator (TACCO) and sensor operator (SENSO) in the back. Entry is via a hatch/ladder folding down out of the lower starboard side of the fuselage behind the cockpit, in between the rear and front seats on the starboard side. When the aircraft's anti-submarine warfare (ASW) role ended in the late 1990s, the enlisted SENSOs were removed from the crew. In tanker crew configuration, the S-3B typically flew with a pilot and co-pilot/COTAC. The wing is fitted with leading edge and Fowler flaps. Spoilers are fitted to both the upper and the lower surfaces of the wings. All control surfaces are actuated by dual hydraulically boosted irreversible systems. In the event of dual hydraulic failures, an Emergency Flight Control System (EFCS) permits manual control with greatly increased stick forces and reduced control authority.

Unlike many tactical jets which required ground service equipment, the S-3 was equipped with an auxiliary power unit (APU) and capable of unassisted starts. The aircraft's original APU could provide only minimal electric power and pressurized air for both aircraft cooling and for the engines' pneumatic starters. A newer, more powerful APU could provide full electrical service to the aircraft. The APU itself was started from a hydraulic accumulator by pulling a handle in the cockpit. The APU accumulator was fed from the primary hydraulic system, but could also be pumped up manually (with much effort) from the cockpit.

All crew members sit on forward-facing, upward-firing Douglas Escapac zero-zero ejection seats. In "group eject" mode, initiating ejection from either of the front seats ejects the entire crew in sequence, with the back seats ejecting 0.5 seconds before the front in order to provide safe separation (this was to prevent the pilots, who were more aware of what was happening outside the aircraft from ejecting without the rest of the crew, or being forced to delay ejection to order the crew to eject in an emergency; ejection from either rear seat would not eject the pilots, who had to initiate their own ejections, to prevent loss of the aircraft if a rear crewmember ejected prematurely. If a pilot ejected prematurely, the plane was lost anyway, and automatic ejection prevented the crew from crashing with a pilot-less aircraft before they were aware of what had happened). The rear seats are capable of self ejection and the ejection sequence includes a pyrotechnic charge that stows the rear keyboard trays out of the occupants' way immediately before ejection. Safe ejection requires the seats to be weighted in pairs, and when flying with a single crewman in the back the unoccupied seat is fitted with ballast.

At the time it entered the fleet, the S-3 introduced an unprecedented level of systems integration. Previous ASW aircraft like the Lockheed P-3 Orion and S-3's predecessor, the Grumman S-2 Tracker, featured separate instrumentation and controls for each sensor system. Sensor operators often monitored paper traces, using mechanical calipers to make precise measurements and annotating data by writing on the scrolling paper. Beginning with the S-3, all sensor systems were integrated through a single General Purpose Digital Computer (GPDC). Each crew station had its own display, the co-pilot/COTAC, TACCO and SENSO displays were Multi-Purpose Displays (MPD) capable of displaying data from any of a number of systems. This new level of integration allowed the crew to consult with each other by examining the same data at multiple stations simultaneously, to manage workload by assigning responsibility for a given sensor from one station to another and to easily combine clues from each sensor to classify faint targets. As a consequence of this integration, the four-crew S-3 was considered roughly equivalent in terms of capability to the much larger P-3, operated by a crew of 12.

The aircraft has two underwing hardpoints that can be used to carry fuel tanks, general purpose and cluster bombs, missiles, rockets, and storage pods. It also has four internal bomb bay stations that can be used to carry general-purpose bombs, aerial torpedoes, and special stores (B57 and B61 nuclear weapons). Fifty-nine sonobuoys are carried, as well as a dedicated Search and Rescue (SAR) chute. The S-3 is fitted with the ALE-39 countermeasure system and can carry up to 90 rounds of chaff, flares, and expendable jammers (or a combination of all) in three dispensers. A retractable magnetic anomaly detector (MAD) Boom is fitted in the tail.

In the late 1990s, the S-3B's role was changed from anti-submarine warfare (ASW) to anti-surface warfare (ASuW). As a consequence of this role change, the MAD Boom was removed, along with several hundred pounds of submarine detection electronics. As there was no remaining sonobuoy processing capability, most of the sonobuoy chutes were faired over with a blanking plate.

== Operational history ==
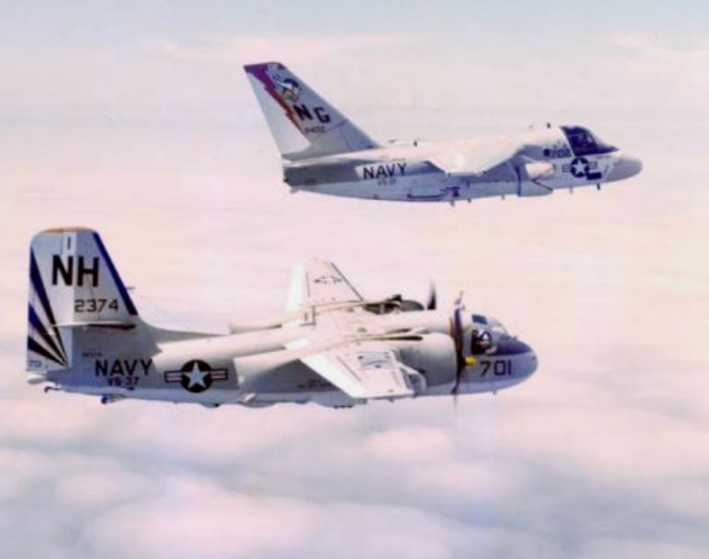
S-3A replaced the outdated S-2 Tracker in 1975

On 20 February 1974, the S-3A officially became operational with the Air Antisubmarine Squadron FORTY-ONE (VS-41), the "Shamrocks," at NAS North Island, California, which served as the initial S-3 Fleet Replacement Squadron (FRS) for both the Atlantic and Pacific Fleets until a separate Atlantic Fleet FRS, VS-27, was established in the 1980s. The first operational cruise of the S-3A took place in 1975 with the VS-21 "Fighting Redtails" aboard USS John F. Kennedy.

Initial operations of the Viking were somewhat troubled in the carrier environment, its sophisticated mission systems were largely dependent on the mission computer, which would often "dump" during the stress of a catapult-assisted take-off, requiring the crew to restart it and reload the software. The U.S. Navy had also purchased an insufficient number of spare parts, which negatively impacted the aircraft's mission readiness. Performance improved considerably once an ample supply of spares was provisioned, allowing the S-3 to become a valuable ASW asset as well as a good surface-surveillance platform.

Starting in 1987, the majority of S-3As were progressively upgraded to the improved S-3B standard; this involved the addition of several new sensors, avionics, and weapons systems, which included the capability to launch the AGM-84 Harpoon anti-ship missile. The S-3B could also be fitted with "buddy stores", external fuel tanks that allowed the Viking to refuel other aircraft. During July 1988, VS-30 became the first fleet squadron to receive the enhanced capability Harpoon/ISAR equipped S-3B, based at NAS Cecil Field in Jacksonville, Florida.

Additional, often more specialised variants, were also produced. 16 S-3As were converted to ES-3A Shadows for carrier-based electronic intelligence (ELINT) duties. Six aircraft, designated US-3A, were converted for a specialized utility and limited cargo Carrier onboard delivery (COD) requirement. This model played a key role in US military efforts to relieve the Iran hostage crisis of 1979–1981. Plans were also made to develop the KS-3A carrier-based tanker aircraft, but this program was ultimately cancelled after the conversion of just one early development S-3A.

As a consequence of the collapse of the Soviet Union and the breakup of the Warsaw Pact in the early 1990s, the Soviet-Russian submarine threat was perceived as much reduced, and the Vikings had the majority of their antisubmarine warfare equipment removed. The aircraft's mission subsequently changed to sea surface search, sea and ground attack, over-the-horizon targeting, and aircraft refueling. As a result, the S-3B after 1997 was typically crewed by a single pilot along with a copilot [NFO]; the additional seats remained in place in the S-3B and could be used by additional crew members for certain missions. To reflect these new missions, the Viking squadrons were redesignated from "Air Antisubmarine Warfare Squadrons" to "Sea Control Squadrons".

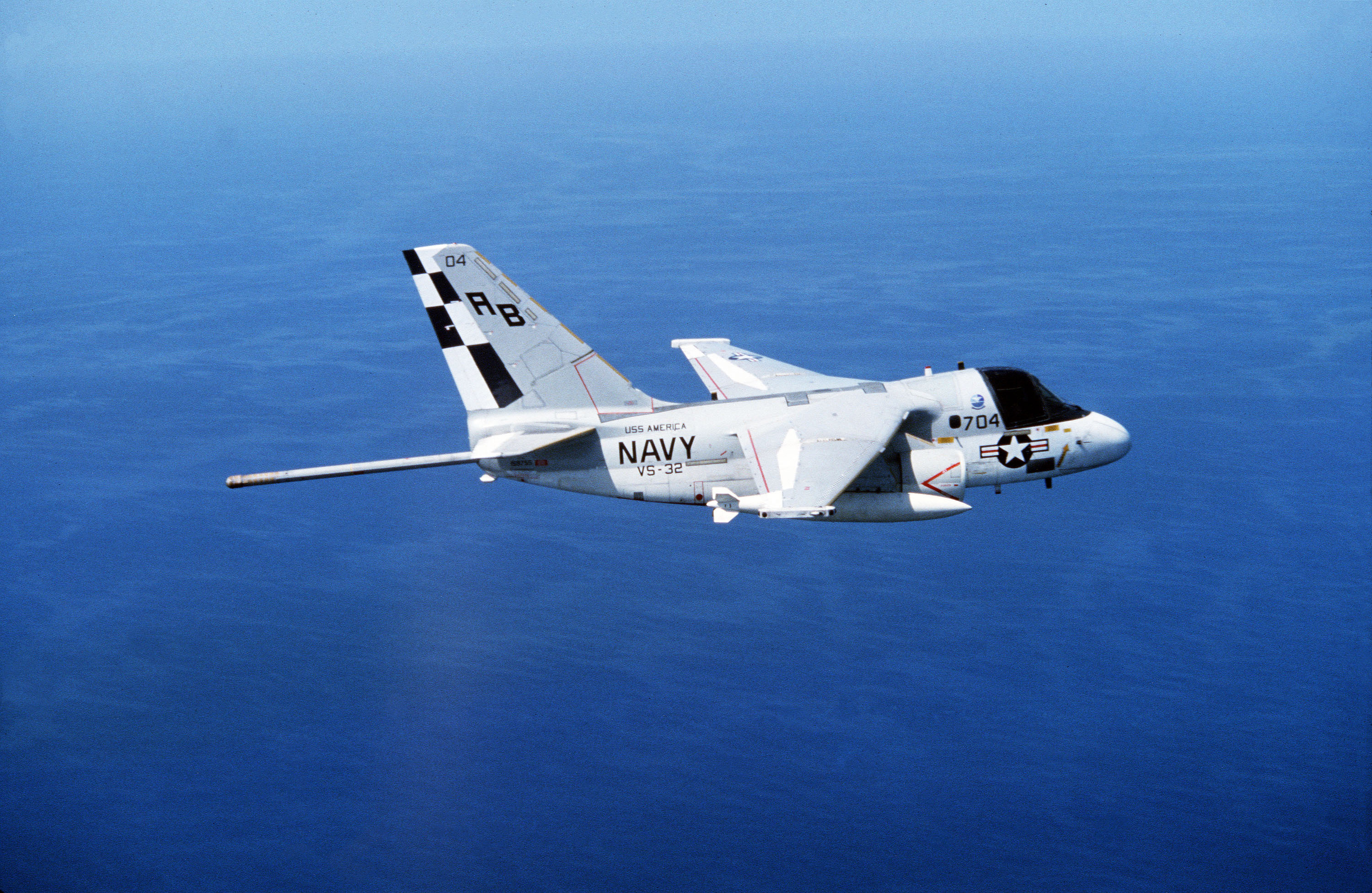
VS-32 S-3A: During the Cold War, the S-3's main task was anti-submarine warfare

Prior to the aircraft's retirement from front-line fleet use aboard US aircraft carriers, a number of upgrade programs were implemented. These include the Carrier Airborne Inertial Navigation System II (CAINS II) upgrade, which replaced older inertial navigation hardware with ring laser gyroscopes with a Honeywell EGI (Enhanced GPS Inertial Navigation System) and added digital electronic flight instruments (EFI). The Maverick Plus System (MPS) added the capability to employ the AGM-65E laser-guided or AGM-65F infrared-guided air-to-surface missile, and the AGM-84H/K Stand-off Land Attack Missile Expanded Response (SLAM/ER). The SLAM/ER is a GPS/inertial/infrared guided cruise missile derived from the AGM-84 Harpoon that can be controlled by the aircrew in the terminal phase of flight if an AWW-13 data link pod is carried by the aircraft.

The S-3B saw extensive service during the 1991 Gulf War, performing attack, tanker, and ELINT duties, and launching ADM-141 TALD decoys. One such aircraft, launched from the aircraft carrier USS Theodore Roosevelt (CVN-71), was responsible for the destruction of an Iraqi Silkworm anti-ship missile site, having fired AGM-84 SLAM missiles at it. It was commonly deployed to hunt for Scud missile launcher. The Vikings also identified and targeted numerous Iraqi naval vessels, and even destroyed anti-aircraft gun emplacements and coastal radars. The Gulf War was the first event in which the type had been employed overland in offensive air strike capacity.

The Viking also participated in the Yugoslav wars in the 1990s, and in Operation Enduring Freedom in the 2000s. For the latter, the opening phase of the War in Afghanistan in October 2001, many Vikings were deployed as tankers to continuously undertake refueling sorties to support various fighters stationed aboard U.S. carriers, giving them the necessary endurance to fly to and from the conflict zone.

=== Electronic surveillance ===
The first ES-3A was delivered during 1991 and entered front-line service after two years of testing. The U.S. Navy established two squadrons, each equipped with eight ES-3As, stationed in both the Atlantic and Pacific Fleets to provide detachments of typically two aircraft, ten officers, and 55 enlisted aircrew, maintenance and support personnel (which comprised/supported four complete aircrews) to deploying carrier air wings. The Pacific Fleet squadron, Fleet Air Reconnaissance Squadron FIVE (VQ-5), the "Sea Shadows," was originally based at the former NAS Agana, Guam but later relocated to NAS North Island in San Diego, California, with the Pacific Fleet S-3 Viking squadrons when NAS Agana closed in 1995 as a result of a 1993 Base Realignment and Closure (BRAC) decision. The Atlantic Fleet squadron, the VQ-6 "Black Ravens," were originally based with all Atlantic Fleet S-3 Vikings at the former NAS Cecil Field in Jacksonville, Florida, but later moved to NAS Jacksonville, approximately 10 miles (16 km) to the east, when NAS Cecil Field was closed in 1999 as a result of the same 1993 BRAC decision that closed NAS Agana.

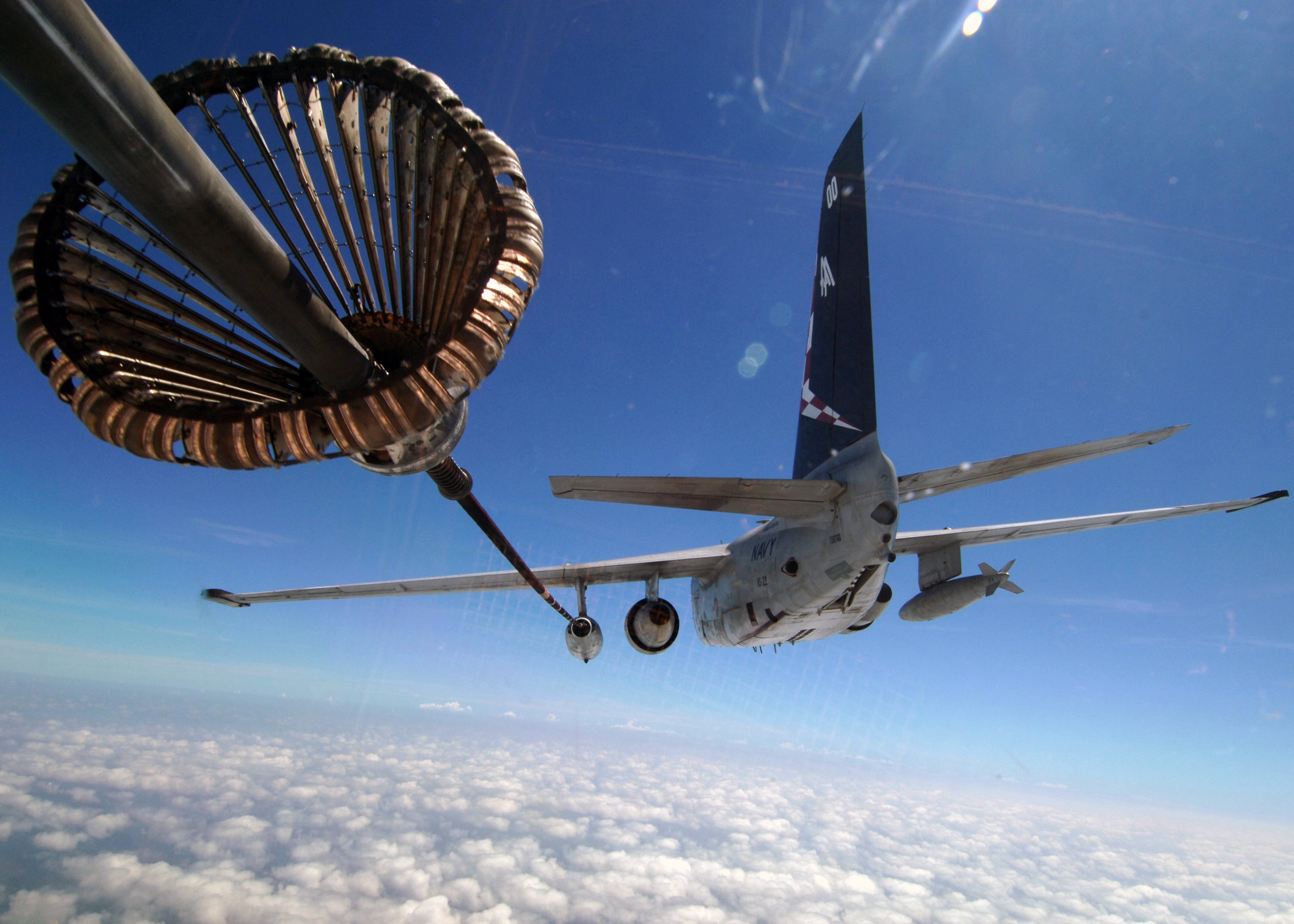
After the KA-6D retirement the S-3B became the main aerial refueling aircraft

The ES-3A operated primarily with carrier battle groups, providing organic 'Indications and Warning' support to the group and joint theater commanders. In addition to their warning and reconnaissance roles, and their extraordinarily stable handling characteristics and range, Shadows were a preferred recovery tanker (aircraft that provide refueling for returning aircraft). They were also deployed to active combat zones, seeing use over Yugoslavia to identify targets, as well as to enforce the no-fly zone over Iraq. The Shadows reportedly averaged over 100 flight hours per month while deployed. Excessive utilization caused earlier than expected equipment replacement when Naval aviation funds were limited, making them an easy target for budget-driven decision makers. The type was also deemed by some officials to be too costly to continue operating. In 1999, both ES-3A squadrons and all 16 aircraft were decommissioned and the ES-3A inventory placed in Aerospace Maintenance and Regeneration Group (AMARG) storage at Davis-Monthan AFB, Arizona.

=== Iraq War ===
The S-3 was an active participant in Operation Iraqi Freedom, the US invasion of Iraq; it largely performed intelligence and reconnaissance missions in support of other coalition assets. On one occasion, in March 2003 a single S-3B Viking from Sea Control Squadron 38 (The "Red Griffins"), piloted by Richard McGrath Jr., from the aircraft carrier USS Constellation (CV-64) successfully executed a time-sensitive strike, firing a laser-guided Maverick missile that neutralized a significant Iraqi naval and leadership target in the port city of Basra, Iraq. This was the first time an S-3 launched a laser-guided Maverick missile in combat. As the conflict progressed, S-3s were regularly used as surveillance aircraft, often to identify improvised explosive devices (IEDs) and the insurgents who planted them.

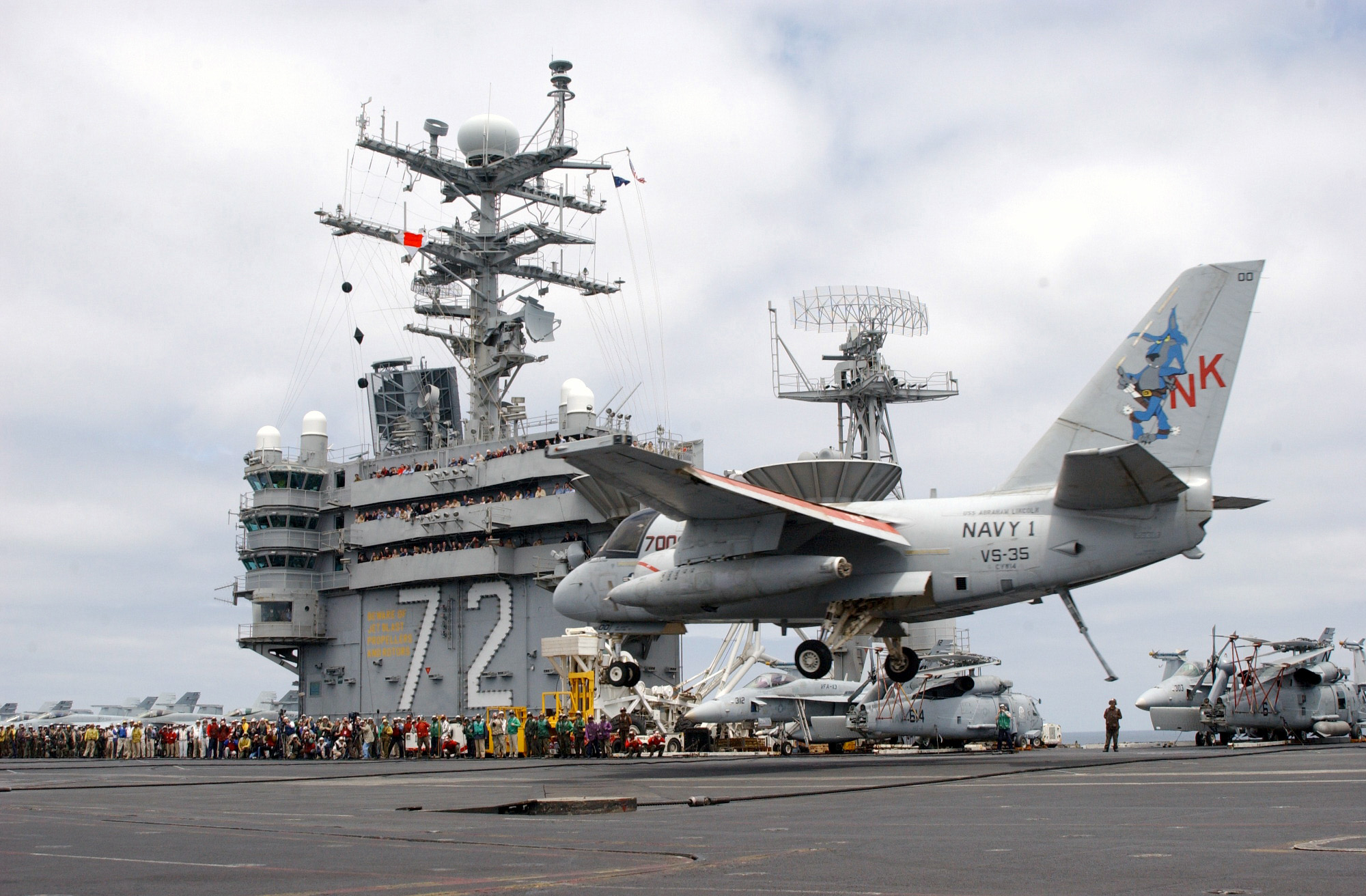
S-3B Viking "Navy One" on USS Abraham Lincoln, May 2003

On 1 May 2003, US President George W. Bush flew in the co-pilot seat of a VS-35 Viking from NAS North Island, California, to the aircraft carrier USS Abraham Lincoln off the California coast; while the carrier was well within range of helicopters, it is believed that the S-3 was used as a means of setting a desired tone. Aboard the carrier, he delivered his "Mission Accomplished" speech announcing the end of major combat in the 2003 invasion of Iraq. During the flight, the aircraft used the presidential callsign of "Navy One". The aircraft that President Bush flew in was retired shortly thereafter and on 15 July 2003 was accepted as an exhibit at the National Museum of Naval Aviation at NAS Pensacola, Florida.

Between July and December 2008, the VS-22 Checkmates, the last sea control squadron, operated a detachment of four S-3Bs from the Al Asad Airbase in Al Anbar Province, 180 miles (290 km) west of Baghdad. The planes were fitted with LANTIRN pods and they performed non-traditional intelligence, surveillance, and reconnaissance. After more than 350 missions, the Checkmates returned to NAS Jacksonville, Florida, on 15 December 2008. The squadron was disestablished on 29 January 2009.

=== Final years and retirement ===
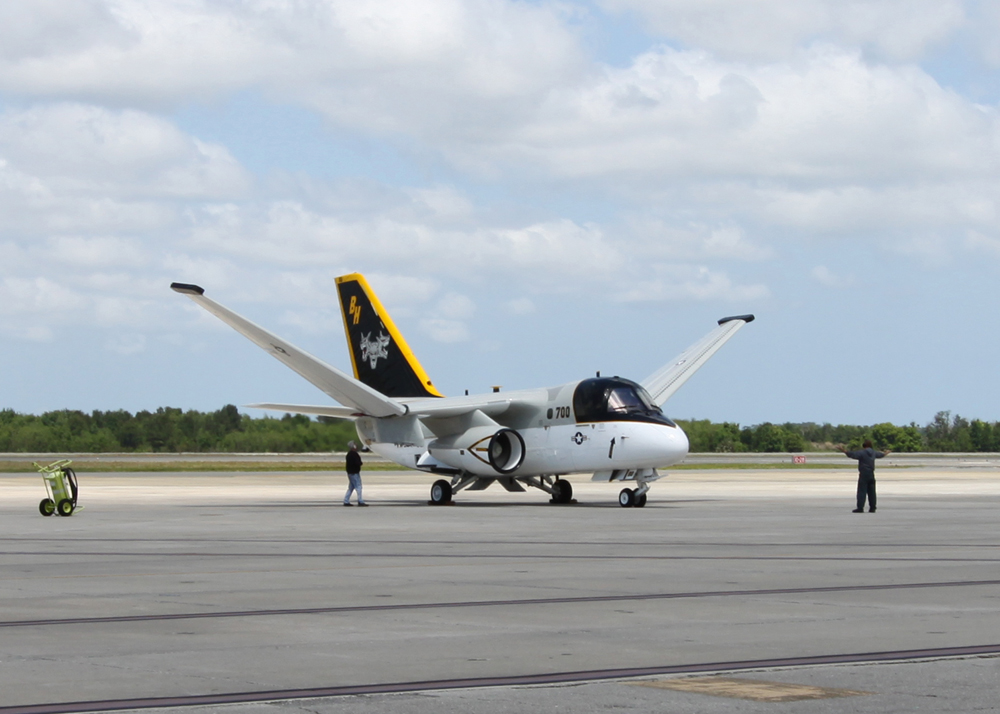
VX-30's S-3B, callsign "Bloodhound 700", in 2010.

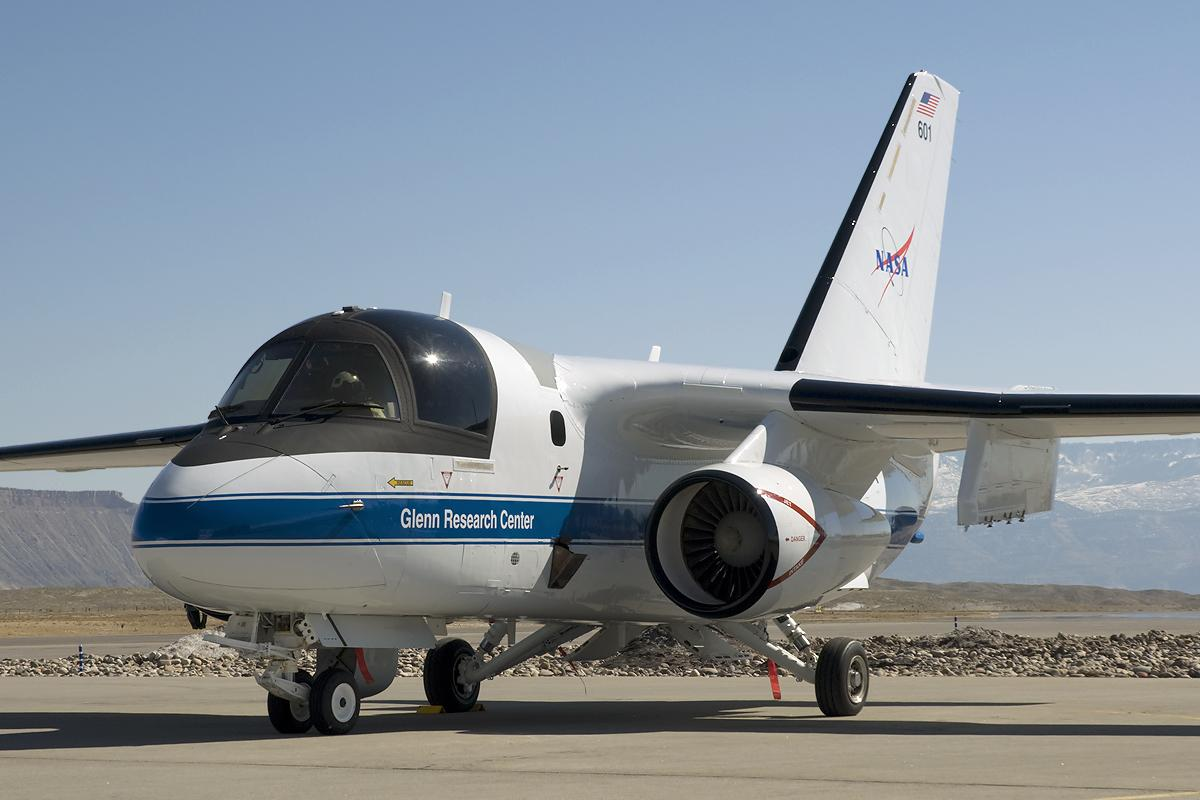
S-3B N601NA was operated by NASA from 2009 to 2021.

A proposed airframe known as the Common Support Aircraft was advanced as a successor to the S-3, E-2, and C-2, but this initiative failed to materialize. In 1998, the U.S. Navy awarded a $40 million contract for Lockheed Martin to perform a full-scale Fatigue testing of the existing S-3s; these tests, which commenced in June 2001, were aimed at extending the viable service life of each remaining aircraft, which had originally been certified for a structural life of 13,000 flight-hours. It was hoped that this could be extended to as much as 17,750 hours.

The final carrier-based S-3B squadron, VS-22, was decommissioned at NAS Jacksonville on 29 January 2009. Sea Control Wing Atlantic was decommissioned the following day, along with the last S-3s in frontline fleet service.

In June 2010, the first of three S-3s to patrol the Pacific Missile Test Center's range areas off of California was reactivated and delivered. The jet aircraft's higher speed, ten-hour endurance, modern radar, and a LANTIRN targeting pod allowed it to quickly confirm the test range being clear of wayward ships and aircraft before tests commence. These S-3Bs are flown by Air Test and Evaluation Squadron Thirty (VX-30) based out of NAS Point Mugu, California. By late 2015, the U.S. Navy were operating a total of three Vikings in support roles. One was relocated to The Boneyard in November 2015, while the final two were retired, one being stored and the other transferred to NASA, on 11 January 2016, officially retiring the S-3 from Navy service.

During 2004, NASA acquired four of the withdrawn S-3Bs for use at its Glenn Research Center. In 2009, one of these aircraft (USN BuNo 160607) was given the civil registration N601NA, it was involved in numerous tests conducted by the agency. For over a decade, this aircraft was flying almost every day in support for various research programs; one such initiative was the definition of new Federal Aviation Administration communication standards for unmanned aerial vehicles operating in US airspace. However, a lack of spare parts and increasing difficulty supporting the type meant their use could not continue in the long term. The last of the NASA's S-3Bs, which were the final working members of the type in existence with any operator at that point, were retired on 13 July 2021.

Naval analysts have suggested that the U.S. Navy return to service an unspecified quantity of the stored S-3s in order to fill gaps that were left in the carrier air wing when it was retired. This move was promoted as a response to the realization that the Chinese navy is producing increasingly capable weapons that can threaten carriers beyond the range their aircraft can strike them. Against the DF-21D anti-ship ballistic missile, carrier-based F/A-18 Super Hornets and F-35C Lightning IIs have about half the unrefueled strike range, so bringing the S-3 back to aerial tanking duties would extend their range against it, as well as free up Super Hornets forced into tanking. Against submarines armed with anti-ship cruise missiles like the Klub and YJ-18, the S-3 would restore area coverage for ASW duties. Bringing the S-3 out of retirement could at least be a stop-gap measure to increase the survivability and capabilities of aircraft carriers until new aircraft can be developed for such purposes.

=== Potential revival and proposals ===
In October 2013, the Republic of Korea Navy expressed its interest in acquiring up to 18 ex-USN S-3s to augment their fleet of 16 Lockheed P-3 Orion aircraft. In August 2015, a military program review group approved a proposal to incorporate 12 mothballed S-3s to perform ASW duties; the Viking plan was sent onto the Defense Acquisition Program Administration for further assessment before final approval decision by the national defense system committee. Although the planes are relatively old, being in storage has supposedly kept them serviceable, and using them is an affordable means of fulfilling short-range airborne ASW capabilities that were vacated by the retirement of the S-2 Tracker. Refurbished S-3s could have been returned to use by 2019. In 2017, the Republic of Korea Navy canceled plans to purchase refurbished and upgraded Lockheed S-3 Viking aircraft for maritime patrol and anti-submarine duties, leaving offers by Airbus, Boeing, Lockheed Martin, and Saab on the table.

During April 2014, Lockheed Martin announced that they would offer refurbished and remanufactured S-3s, dubbed the C-3, as a replacement for the Northrop Grumman C-2A Greyhound for carrier onboard delivery. The requirement for 35 aircraft would be met from the 91 S-3s currently in storage. In February 2015, the Navy announced that the Bell Boeing V-22 Osprey had been selected to replace the C-2 for the COD mission. A SV-22 was a proposed anti-submarine warfare variant the U.S. Navy studied in the 1980s to replace S-3 Viking and late model SH-2 Seasprite ASW helicopters.

== Variants ==
US-3A of VRC-50 in 1987

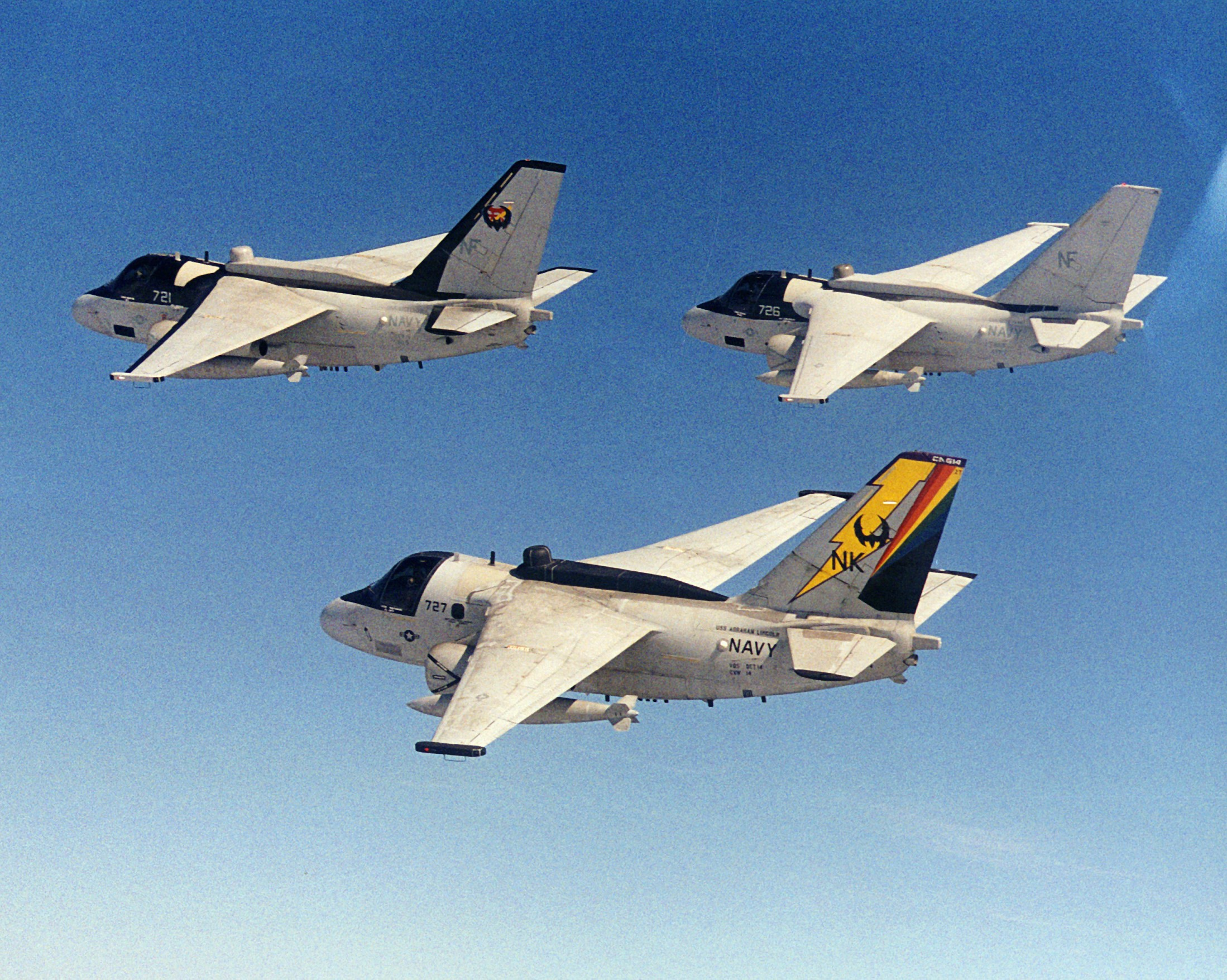
ES-3As of VQ-5

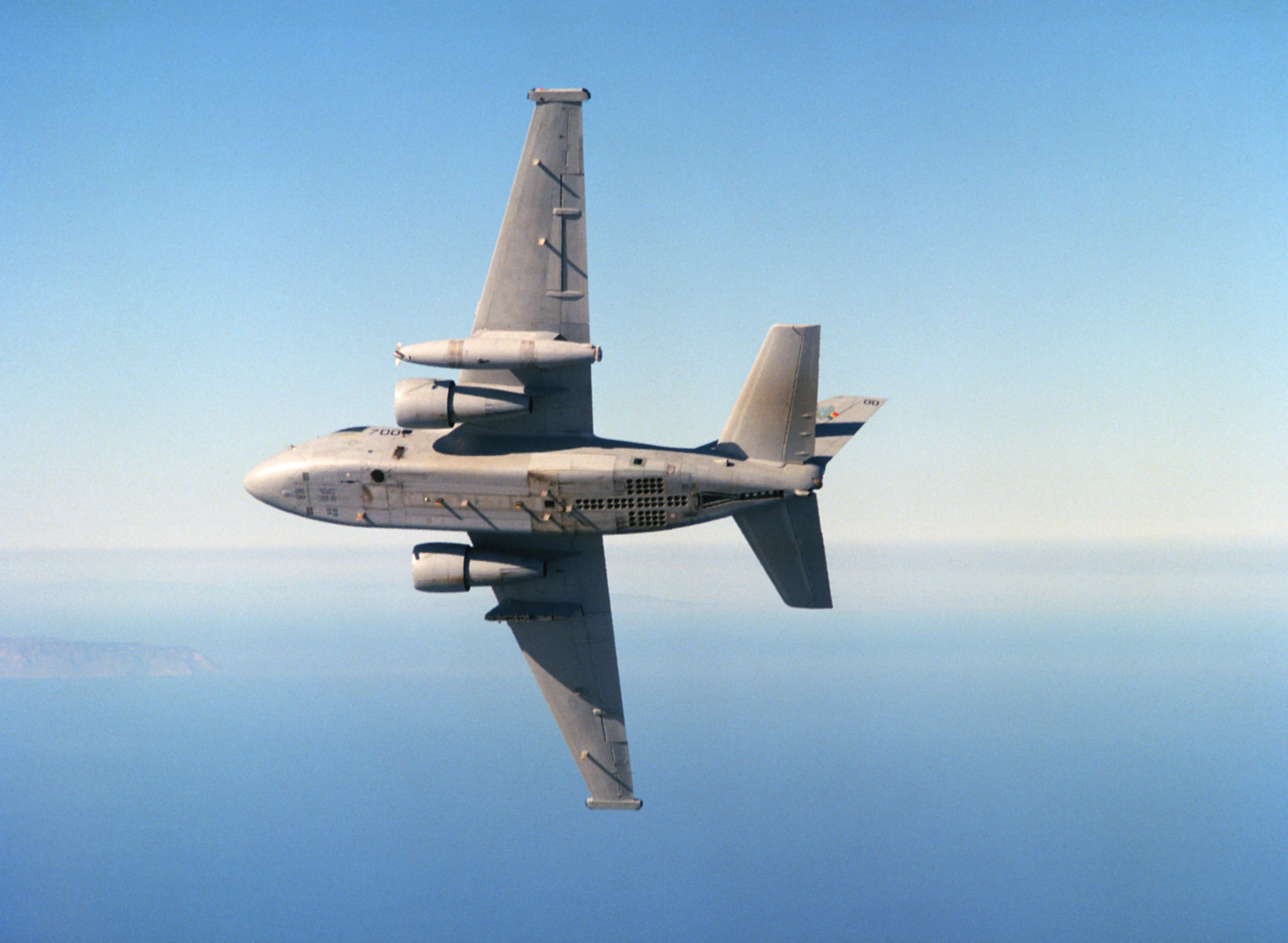
S-3B with D-704 buddy store

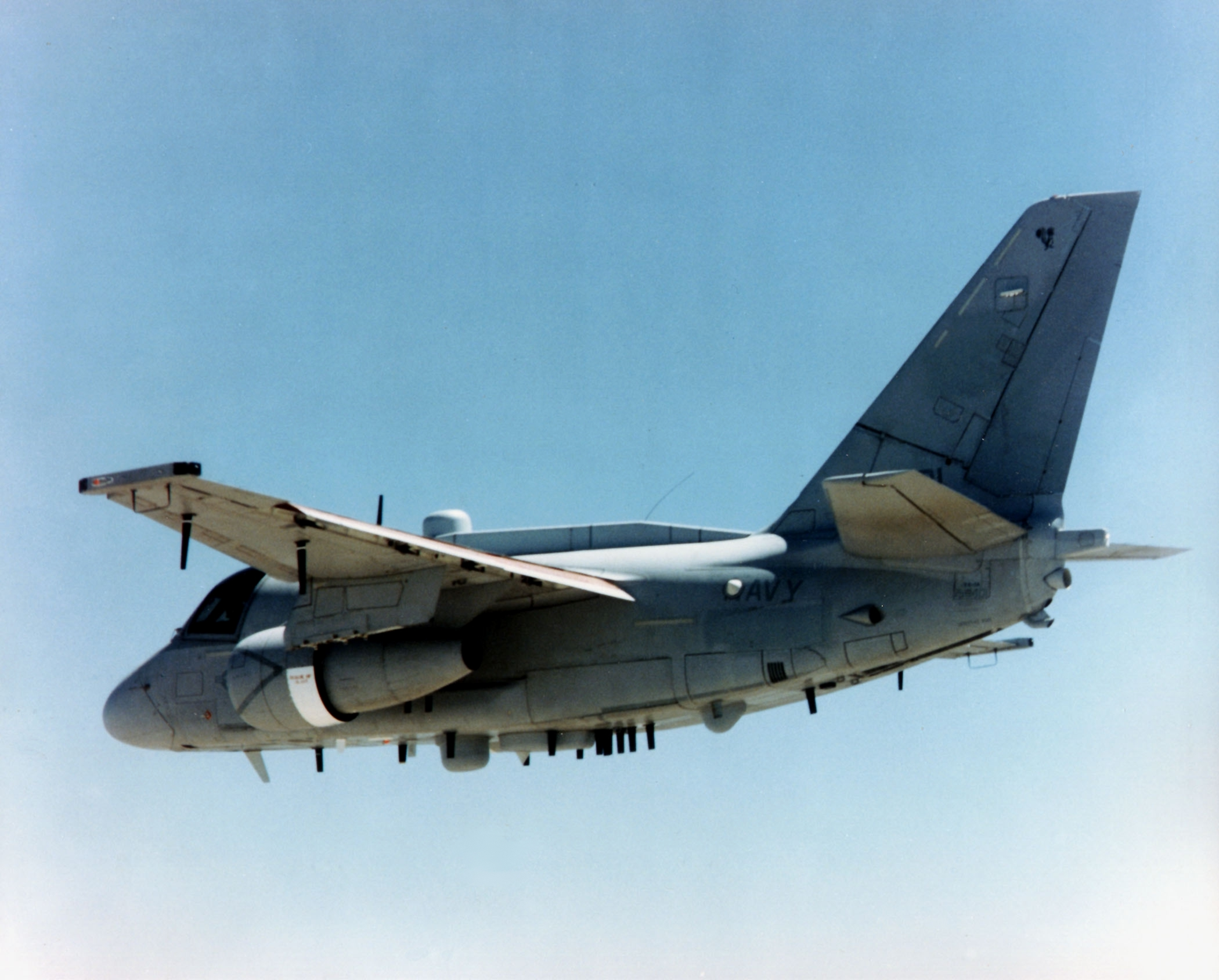
ES-3A Shadow of VQ-6

S-3A
First production version, 187 built.
S-3B
Upgraded avionics, AN/APS-137 inverse synthetic aperture radar, Joint Tactical Information Distribution System, AGM-84 Harpoon launch capability, first flight 13 September 1984, 119 converted from S-3As.
ES-3A Shadow
Designed as a carrier-based, subsonic, all-weather, long-range, electronic reconnaissance (ELINT) aircraft. 16 aircraft were modified to replace the EA-3B Skywarrior, entering fleet service in 1993. The ES-3A carried an extensive suite of electronic sensors and communications gear, replacing the S-3's submarine detection, armament, and maritime surveillance equipment with avionics racks accommodating the ES-3A's sensors. These modifications had minor impact on airspeed, reducing its top rated speed from 450 to 405 knots (833 to 750 km/h) but had no noticeable impact on the aircraft's range and actually increased its rated loiter time. Because these aircraft were standoff indications and warnings platforms and were never intended to be part of an ingress strike package, this new speed limitation was considered insignificant.
KS-3A
Proposed dedicated air tanker with fuel capacity of 4,382 US gal (16,600 L), one converted from YS-3A, later converted to US-3A.
KS-3B
Proposed air tanker based on S-3B and utilizing the buddy refueling system, not built.
US-3A
S-3A modified for carrier onboard delivery, capacity for six passengers or 4,680 pounds (2,120 kg) of cargo, retired in 1998.
Aladdin Viking
Conversion of six aircraft for overland surveillance and Elint missions. May have dropped ground sensors in the Bosnian War.
Beartrap Viking
S-3Bs fitted with still-classified modifications.
Calypso Viking
Proposed anti-smuggling variant, not built.
Gray Wolf Viking
One aircraft fitted with AN/APG-76 radar in a modified cargo pod under the wing. Also dubbed SeaSTARS in reference to E-8 Joint STARS.
Orca Viking
Avionics testbed.
Outlaw Viking
One S-3B fitted with Over-the-horizon Airborne Sensor Information System (OASIS III), returned to regular S-3B in 1998. This particular Viking is now on display at the USS Midway Museum, located on the decommissioned USS Midway (CV-41).

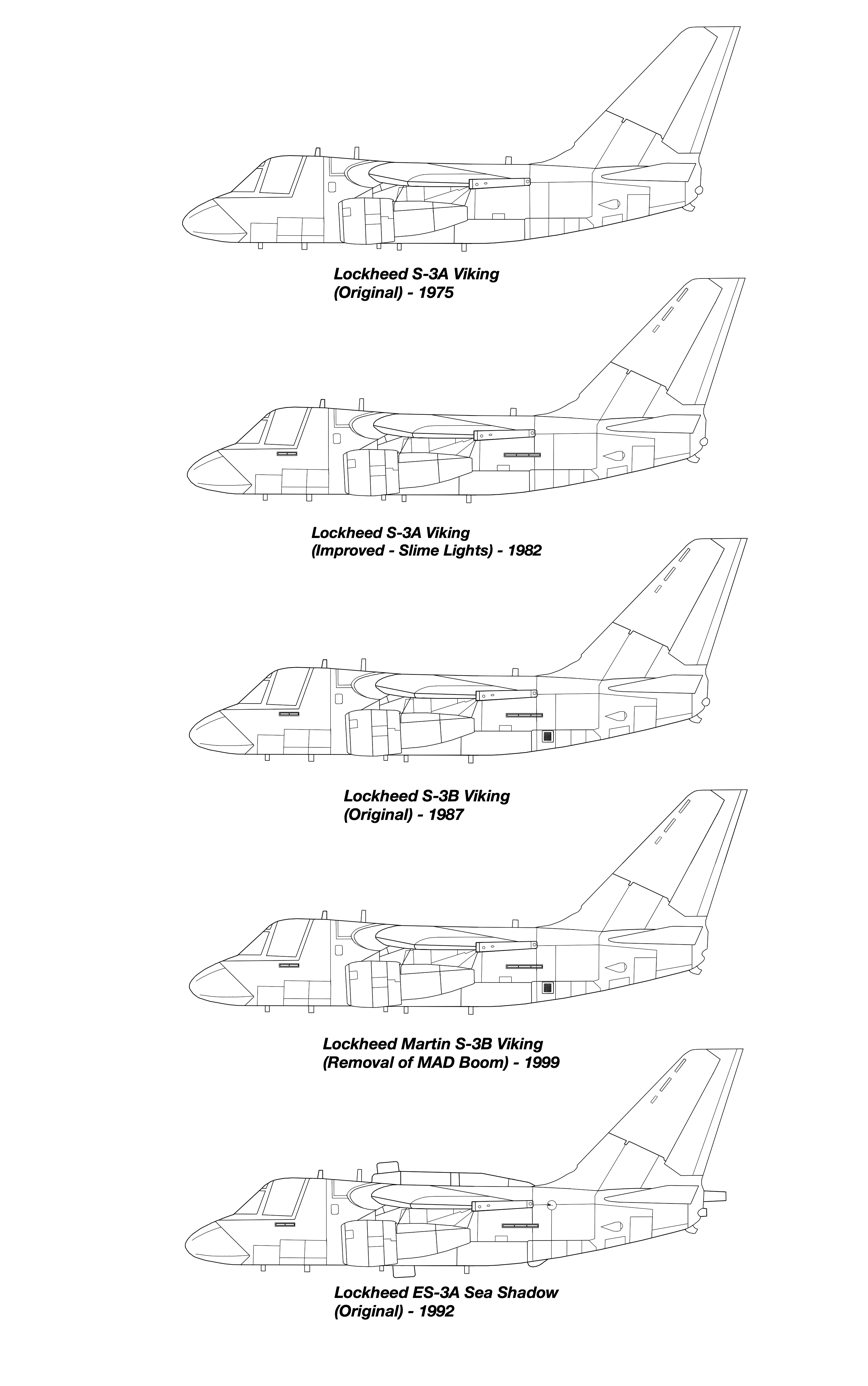
Main Variants of the S-3 Viking.

NASA Viking
One aircraft was extensively rebuilt into a state-of-the-art NASA research aircraft. The Navy's Fleet Readiness Center Southeast and a Boeing facility in Florida modified it, adding commercial satellite communications, global positioning navigation, and weather radar systems. They also installed research equipment racks in what was once the plane's bomb bay. NASA's S-3B Viking was equipped to conduct science and aeronautics missions, such as environmental monitoring, satellite communications testing, and aviation safety research.

== Operators ==
United States

- United States Navy (former)
  - VS-21 Red Tails (1975-2005)
  - VS-22 Checkmates (1976-2009)
  - VS-24 Scouts (1977-2007)
  - VS-27 Seawolves/Grim Watchdogs (1987-1994)
  - VS-28 Hukkers/Gamblers (1976-1992)
  - VS-29 Dragonfires (1976-2004)
  - VS-30 Diamond Cutters (1977-2007)
  - VS-31 Topcats (1977-2008)
  - VS-32 Maulers (1976-2008)
  - VS-33 Screwbirds (1977-2006)
  - VS-35 Boomerangers/Blue Wolves (1986-88/1991-2005)
  - VS-37 Sawbucks (1978-1995)
  - VS-38 Red Griffins (1978-2004)
  - VS-41 Shamrocks (1974-2006)
  - VQ-5 Sea Shadows (1991-1999)
  - VQ-6 Black Ravens (1991-1999)
  - VX-1 Pioneers (Unknown)
- NASA (former)

== Aircraft on display ==
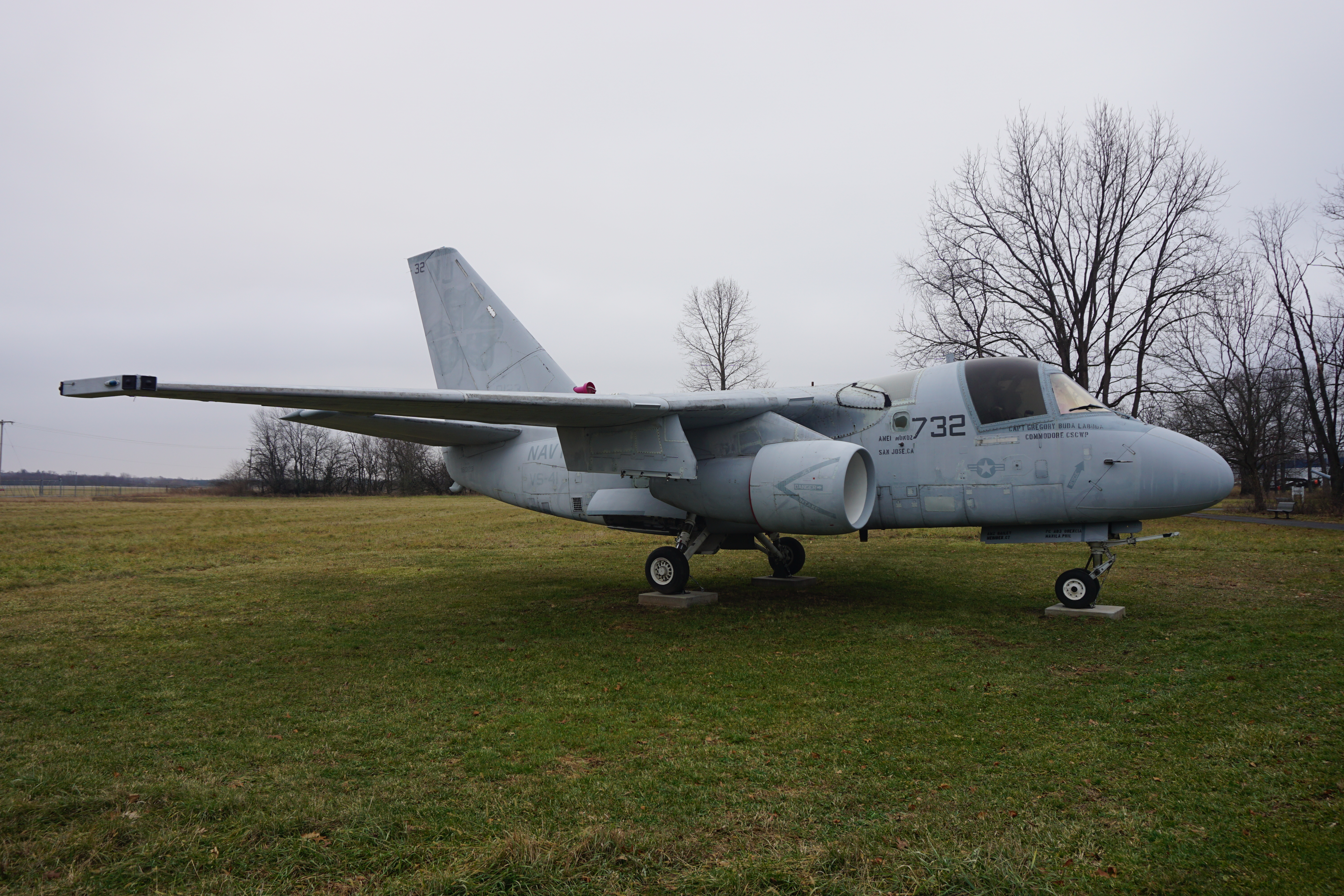
S-3 on display at the Air Zoo

YS-3A

- 157993 – NAS Jacksonville Aircraft Heritage Park, NAS Jacksonville, Jacksonville, Florida.

S-3A

- 159417 – Celebrity Row, Davis-Monthan AFB (North Side), Tucson, Arizona.

ES-3A

- 159404 – Celebrity Row, Davis-Monthan AFB (North Side), Tucson, Arizona.

S-3B

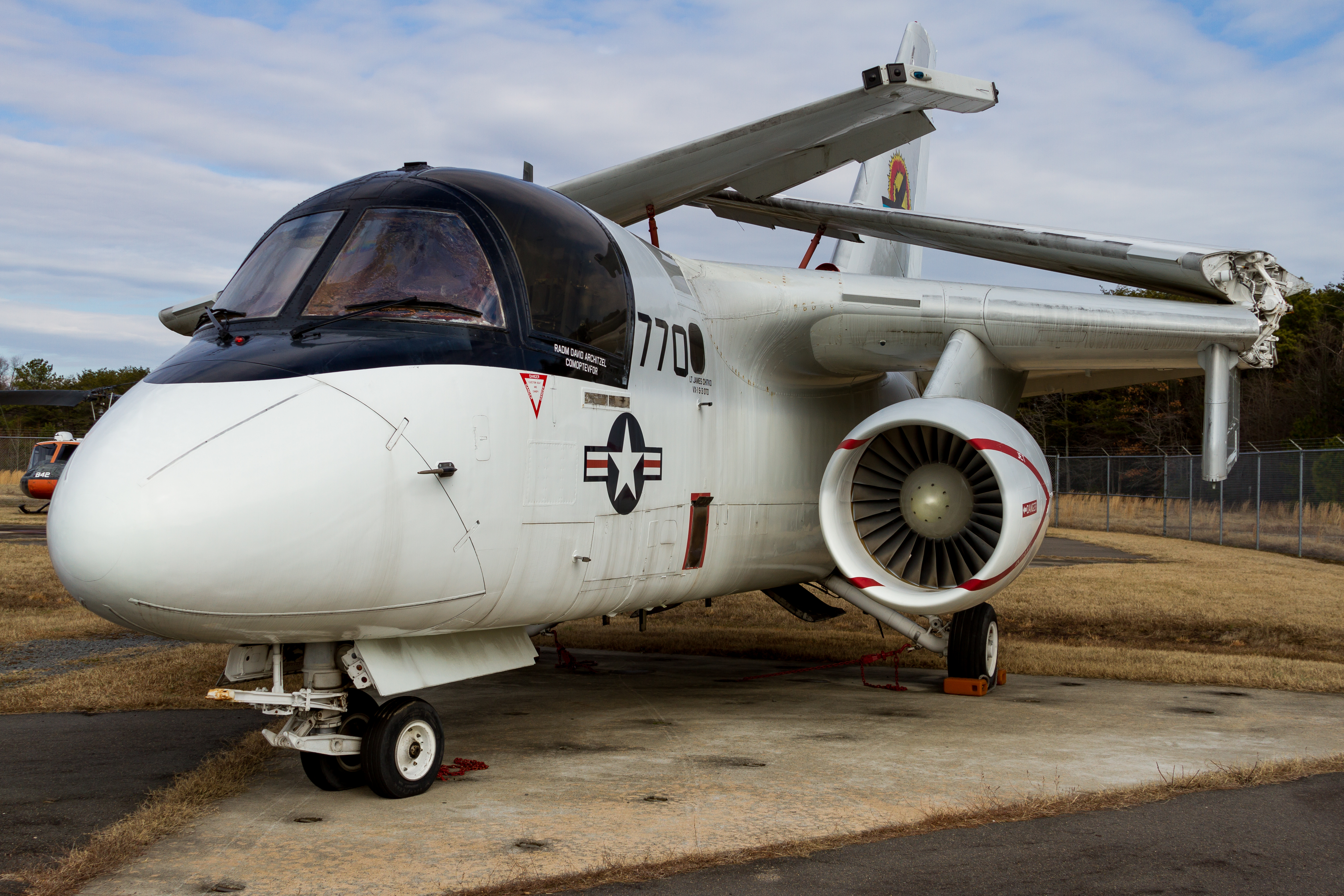
S-3B on display at the Patuxent River Naval Air Museum

- 159387 – Navy One National Naval Aviation Museum, NAS Pensacola, Pensacola, Florida.
- 159412 – NAS North Island, San Diego, California.
- 159731 – USS Yorktown (CV-10) at the Patriot's Point Naval and Maritime Museum, Charleston, South Carolina.
- 159743 – Aviation History & Technology Center, Dobbins ARB (formerly Atlanta NAS), Marietta, Georgia.
- 159755 – NAS Pensacola, Pensacola, Florida.
- 159766 – USS Midway (CV-41) at San Diego, California.
- 159770 – Patuxent River Naval Air Museum, Lexington Park, Maryland.
- 160123 – Air Zoo at Kalamazoo, Michigan.
- 160599 – USS Hornet (CVS-12) at the former NAS Alameda, Alameda, California.
- 160604 – Pima Air and Space Museum (adjacent to Davis-Monthan AFB), Tucson, Arizona.
- N601NA (160607) - NASA Viking San Diego Air & Space Museum, San Diego, California.

== Specifications (S-3A) ==
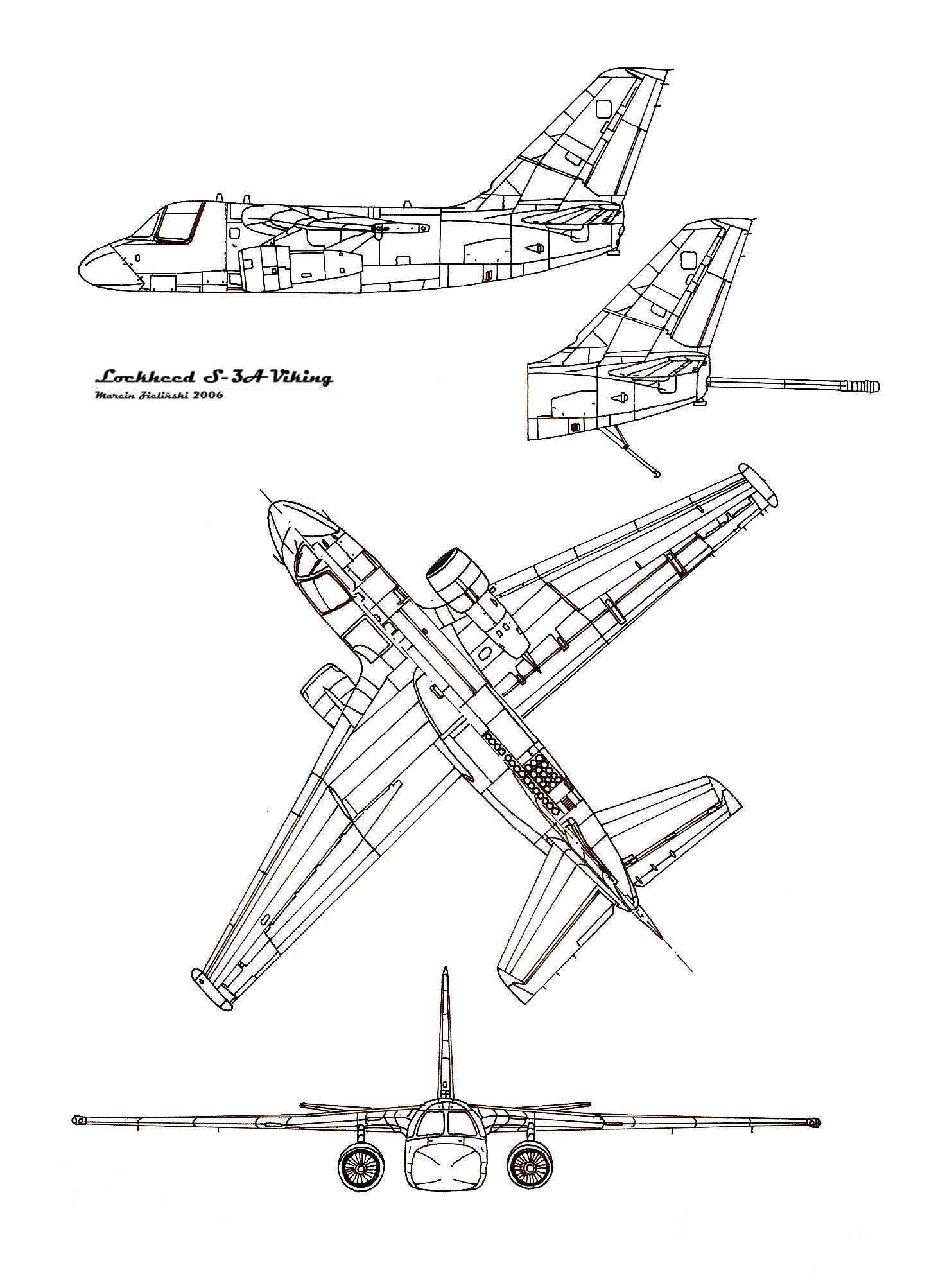

Data from Standard Aircraft Characteristics

General characteristics

- Crew: 4 (pilot, co-pilot, TACCO, sensor operator)
- Length: 53 ft 4 in (16.26 m)
- Wingspan: 68 ft 8 in (20.93 m)
- Width: 29 ft 6 in (8.99 m) folded
- Height: 22 ft 9 in (6.93 m) * Height tail folded: 15 ft 3 in (5 m)
- Wing area: 598 sq ft (55.6 m^{2})
- Aspect ratio: 7.73
- Airfoil: root: NACA 0016.3-1.03 32.7/100 mod; tip: NACA 0012-1.10 40/1.00 mod
- Empty weight: 26,581 lb (12,057 kg)
- Gross weight: 38,192 lb (17,324 kg)
- Max takeoff weight: 52,539 lb (23,831 kg)
- Fuel capacity: * Internal fuel capacity: 1,933 US gal (1,610 imp gal; 7,320 L) of JP-5 fuel
- External fuel capacity: 2 × 300 US gal (250 imp gal; 1,100 L) drop tanks
- Powerplant: 2 × General Electric TF34-GE-2 turbofan engines, 9,275 lbf (41.26 kN) thrust each

Performance

- Maximum speed: 429 kn (494 mph, 795 km/h) at sea level
- Maximum speed: Mach 0.79
- Cruise speed: 350 kn (400 mph, 650 km/h)
- Stall speed: 97 kn (112 mph, 180 km/h)
- Range: 2,765 nmi (3,182 mi, 5,121 km)
- Combat range: 460.5 nmi (529.9 mi, 852.8 km)
- Ferry range: 3,368 nmi (3,876 mi, 6,238 km)
- Service ceiling: 40,900 ft (12,500 m)
- Rate of climb: 5,120 ft/min (26.0 m/s)
- Wing loading: 68.5 lb/sq ft (334 kg/m^{2})
- Thrust/weight: 0.353

Armament

- Up to 4,900 pounds (2,200 kg) on 4 internal and 2 external hardpoints, including:
  - 10 × 500 pounds (230 kg) Mark 82 bombs
  - 2 × 1,000 pounds (450 kg) Mark 83 bombs
  - 2 × 2,000 pounds (910 kg) Mark 84 bombs
  - 6 × CBU-100 cluster bombs
  - 2 × Mark 50 torpedoes
  - 4 × Mark 46 torpedoes
  - 6 × mines or depth charges
  - 2 × B57 nuclear bombs (depth charges)
  - 2 × AGM-65E/F Maverick missiles
  - 2 × AGM-84D Harpoon missiles
  - 1 × AGM-84H/K SLAM-ER missile
- The underwing hardpoints can also be fitted with unguided rocket pods or 300 US gal (1,136 L) fuel tanks.

Avionics

- CPU-175/A Central air data computer
- AN/APS-116 sea search radar, maximum range 150 nmi (170 mi; 280 km)
  - Upgraded on S-3B to AN/APS-137 inverse synthetic aperture radar (ISAR)
- OR-89 forward looking infrared (FLIR) camera with 3× zoom
- AN/ARS-2 sonobuoy receiver with 13 blade antennas on the airframe for precise buoy location (sonobuoy reference system)
- AN/ASQ-81 magnetic anomaly detector (MAD)
- AN/ALR-47 electronic support measures (ESM) emitter-location system, with boxy receiver pods fitted to the wingtips, to locate adversary communications and radar transmitters
- AN/ASN-92 inertial navigation system (INS) with Doppler radar navigation and TACAN
- Up to 60 sonobuoys (59 tactical, 1 search and rescue)

== See also ==
- Lockheed CP-140 Aurora

Aircraft of comparable role, configuration, and era

- Bréguet 1050 Alizé
- Fairey Gannet
- Grumman S-2 Tracker

Related lists

- List of Lockheed aircraft
- List of military aircraft of the United States
