= Cast Glance =

Optical instrument used by the US Navy and US Air Force

Cast Glance is a gyrostabilized optical instrument used by the United States Navy and United States Air Force. It is an airborne system that is used by Air Test and Evaluation Squadron 30 (VX-30) on board the Lockheed NP-3D variant of the P-3 Orion. The system consists of a moving gyro-stabilised mirror with fixed optics, two fixed cameras and five sensors. The cameras look out of the starboard side of the aircraft. The system is photometric and enables the simultaneous recording of the electro-optical to the infrared spectrum and medium wave IR.

The system provides photographic coverage of air-to-air, air-to-surface or surface-to-air test operations. Cast Glance was also used to support the Space Shuttle program.
