= VS-41 =

Sea Control Squadron 41
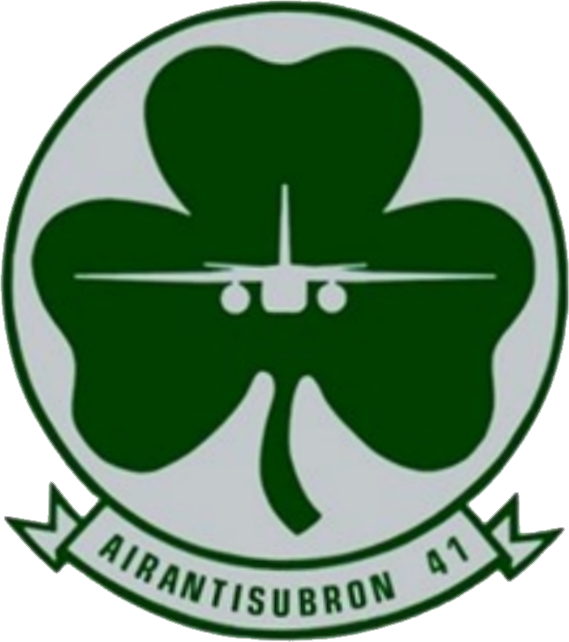
- Active: 1960-2006
- Country: United States of America
- Branch: United States Navy
- Role: Fleet Replacement Squadron
- Former Homeport: Naval Air Station North Island
- Nickname(s): "Shamrocks"
- Former Aircraft: S-3 Viking

VS-41, Sea Control Squadron 41 was a training squadron of the United States Navy for crews of anti-submarine aircraft and was established on 30 June 1960 as an "anti-submarine squadron". The squadron was nicknamed Shamrocks and based at the Naval Air Station North Island, California (USA).

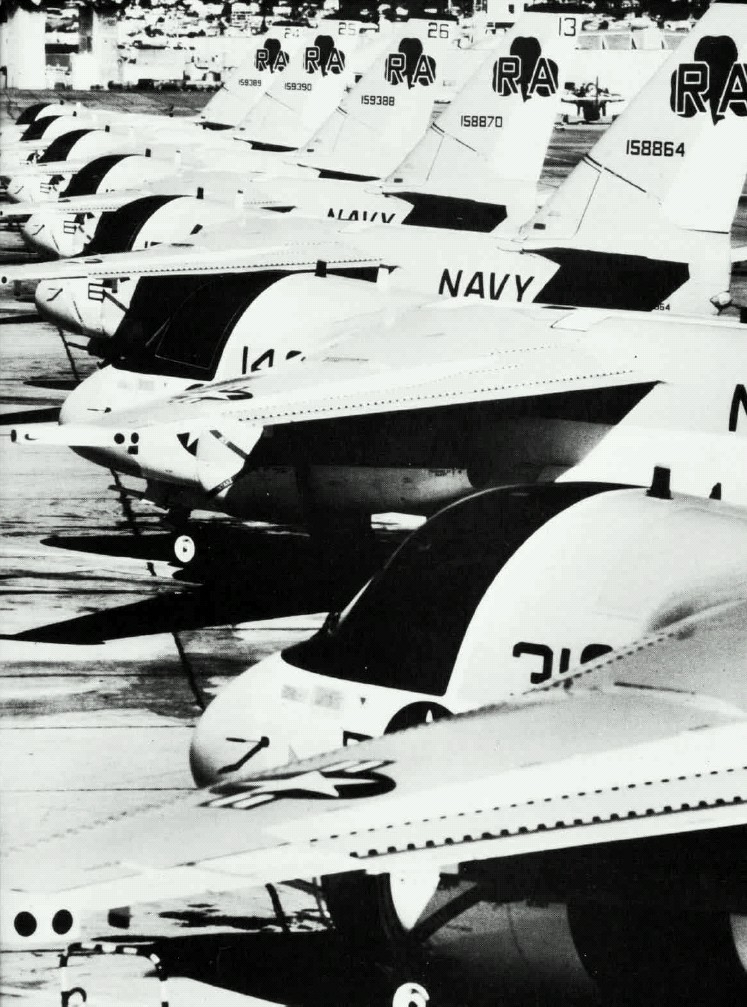
S-3As of VS-41 at NAS North Island, 1982

== Background ==
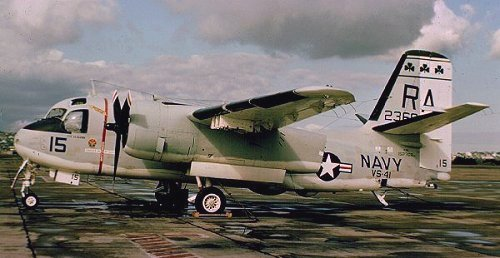
An S-2E Tracker of VS-41

VS-41 was originally activated in 1960 to train the crews of Grumman S-2 Tracker anti-submarine aircraft for the United States Navy. Two squadrons equipped with the Tracker were based each on the anti-submarine carriers (CVS) of the Essex-class to counter the threat of the large Soviet submarine fleet. In the mid-1970 both the CVS-carriers and the S-2 Tracker were phased out.

== History ==
On 20 February 1974 VS-41 received the successor of the Tracker, the Lockheed S-3A Viking. The Viking-squadrons were integrated into the former Attack Carrier Air Wings, which became Carrier Air Wings. During the latter half of the 1980s VS-41 was equipped with the upgraded S-3B. With the diminishing submarine threat after the end of the Cold War VS-41 was redesignated as a "Sea Control Squadron" on 1 October 1993. In 1994 the squadron became responsible for the training of all U.S. Navy S-3 squadrons.

The training included working with the computer systems that processed information generated by acoustic and non-acoustic target sensor systems; Inverse Synthetic Aperture Radar (ISAR) and ESM systems suites. Identified targets should then be destroyed with conventional bombs, cluster bombs, rockets, AGM-84 Harpoon or AGM-65 Maverick air-to-surface missiles, Mark 46 torpedoes, or Mark 54 depth bombs. The Viking could also drop mines. Additionally, all S-3B aircraft were equipped to carrying an inflight refueling "buddy" store.

VS-41 flew in excess of 10,000 hours per year, qualifying approximately 50 fleet pilots and 80 tactical coordinators (TACCO)and 80 sensor operators (SENSO) yearly. From 1960 to 2008, the training squadron logged more than 347,000 flight hours, made more than 48,000 carrier landings, and trained more than 35,000 personnel. On 30 September 2006, the squadron was officially disestablished at Naval Air Station North Island, CA.

The squadron history or lineages should not be confused with the VS-41 "Tophatters" that flew the SBD-3 Dauntless torpedo bombers during World War II from the deck of USS Ranger.

== See also ==
- History of the United States Navy
- List of inactive United States Navy aircraft squadrons
- List of United States Navy aircraft squadrons
