= USS Crommelin =

1981 Oliver Hazard Perry-class frigate

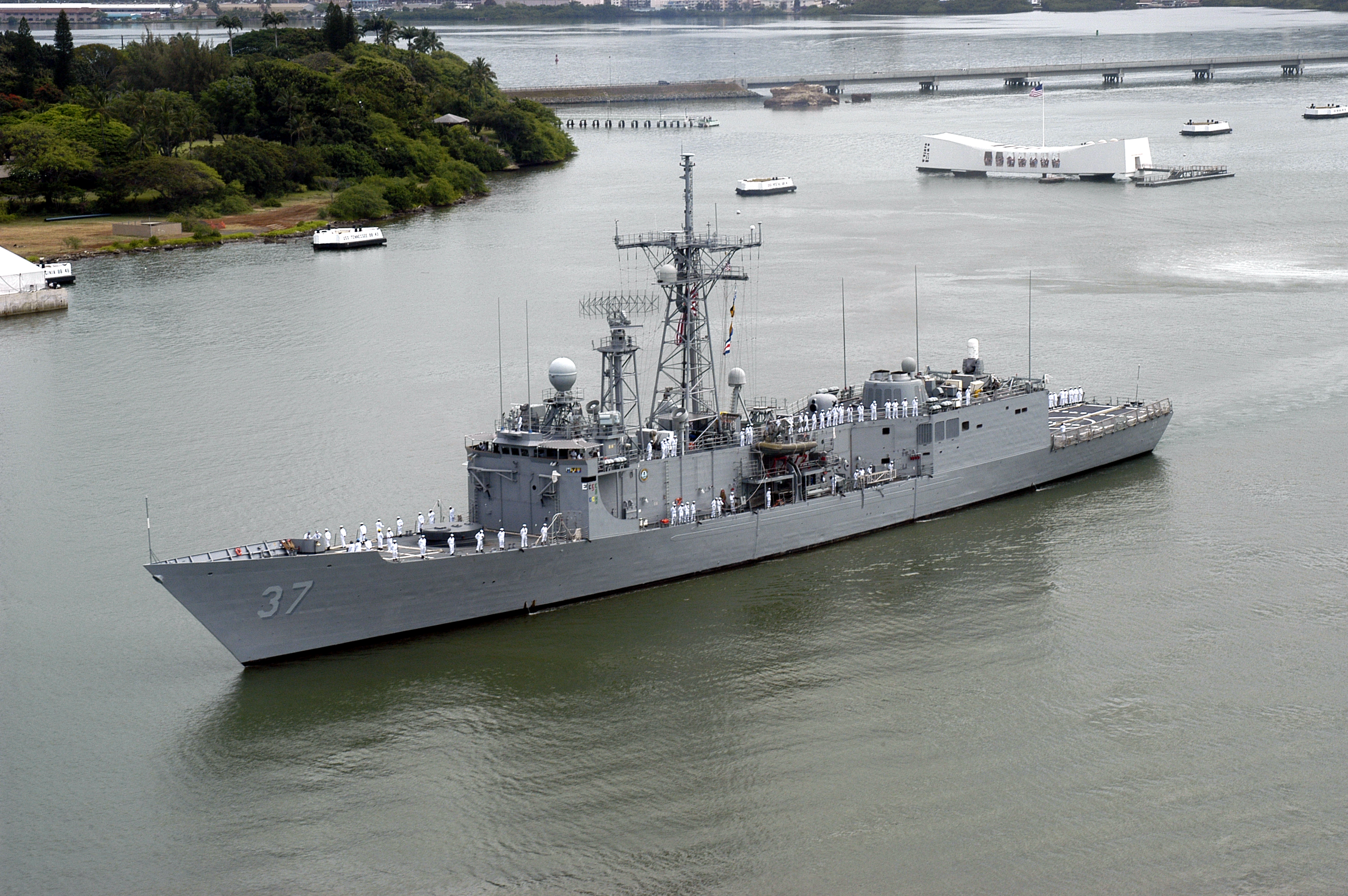
- Sailors aboard Crommelin man the rails as the ship passes the Arizona Memorial in Pearl Harbor, 12 May 2004.

History

United States
- Name: Crommelin
- Namesake: The Crommelin brothers: Rear Admiral John G. Crommelin (1902–1996); Vice Admiral Henry Crommelin (1904–1971); Commander Charles L. Crommelin (1909–1945); Lieutenant Commander Richard Crommelin (1917–1945); Captain Quentin C. Crommelin (1919–1997)
- Awarded: 27 April 1979
- Builder: Todd Pacific Shipyards, Seattle, Washington
- Laid down: 30 May 1980
- Launched: 2 July 1981
- Commissioned: 18 June 1983
- Decommissioned: 31 October 2012
- Stricken: 31 October 2012
- Home port: Pearl Harbor, Hawaii
- Identification: Hull symbol:FFG-37; Code letters:NLKC
- Motto: Munus Bene Factum 'Job Well Done'
- Honours and awards: Joint Meritorious Unit Award, Meritorious Unit Commendation, Battle Efficiency Ribbon (Navy "E")
- Fate: Sunk as target 19 July 2016 for RIMPAC 2016
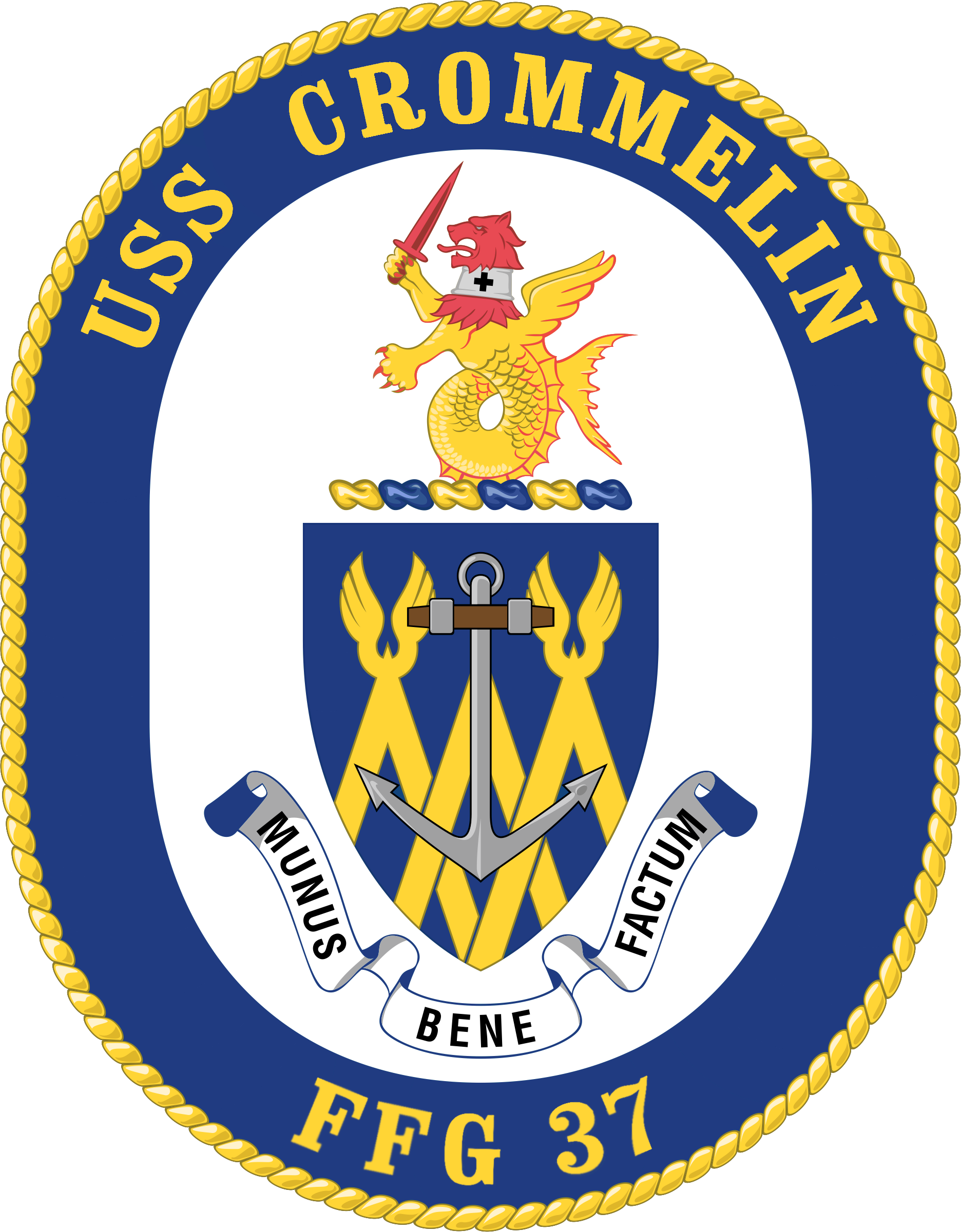
- Badge

General characteristics
- Class & type: Oliver Hazard Perry-class frigate
- Displacement: 4,100 long tons (4,200 t), full load
- Length: 453 feet (138 m), overall
- Beam: 45 feet (14 m)
- Draft: 22 feet (6.7 m)
- Propulsion: 2 × General Electric LM2500-30 gas turbines generating 41,000 shp (31 MW) through a single shaft and variable pitch propeller; 2 × Auxiliary Propulsion Units, 350 hp (260 kW) retractable electric azimuth thrusters for maneuvering and docking.
- Speed: over 29 knots (54 km/h)
- Range: 5,000 nautical miles at 18 knots (9,300 km at 33 km/h)
- Complement: 15 officers and 190 enlisted, plus SH-60 LAMPS detachment of roughly six officer pilots and 15 enlisted maintainers
- Sensors & processing systems: AN/SPS-49 air-search radar; AN/SPS-55 surface-search radar; CAS and STIR fire-control radar; AN/SQS-56 sonar.
- Electronic warfare & decoys: AN/SLQ-32
- Armament: As built: 1 × OTO Melara Mk 75 76 mm/62 caliber naval gun; 2 × Mk 32 triple-tube (324 mm) launchers for Mark 46 torpedoes; 1 × Vulcan Phalanx CIWS; 4 × .50-cal (12.7 mm) machine guns.; 1 × Mk 13 Mod 4 single-arm launcher for Harpoon anti-ship missiles and SM-1MR Standard anti-ship/air missiles (40 round magazine); Note: As of 2004, Mk 13 systems removed from all active US vessels of this class.
- Aircraft carried: 2 × SH-60 LAMPS III helicopters

USS Crommelin (FFG-37), twenty-eighth ship of the Oliver Hazard Perry-class of guided-missile frigates, was named for five brothers: Rear Admiral John G. Crommelin (1902–1996), Vice Admiral Henry Crommelin (1904–1971), Commander Charles L. Crommelin (1909–1945), Lieutenant Commander Richard Crommelin (1917–1945), and Captain Quentin C. Crommelin (1919–1997). The Crommelin brothers were the only group of five siblings ever to graduate from the United States Naval Academy. Four of them became pilots, and Time magazine dubbed them "The Indestructibles." The brothers saw action in more than ten campaigns in the Pacific Theater. Henry, the second-oldest, became a Surface Warfare Officer while Richard and Charles died in combat as naval aviators in 1945. Individually and as a fighting family, they gained fame in World War II, attaining outstanding combat records and multiple decorations. Crommelin (FFG-37) is the first ship of that name in the United States Navy.

Ordered from Todd Pacific Shipyard, Seattle, Washington on 27 April 1979 as part of the Fiscal year 1979 program, Crommelin was laid down on 30 May 1980, launched on 2 July 1981, and commissioned on 18 June 1983.

After three decades of service, Crommelin was decommissioned in a ceremony at Pearl Harbor, 26 October 2012. It had rescued 96 people from the high seas and seized roughly $1.25 billion worth of cocaine over its lifetime.

== Operational history ==
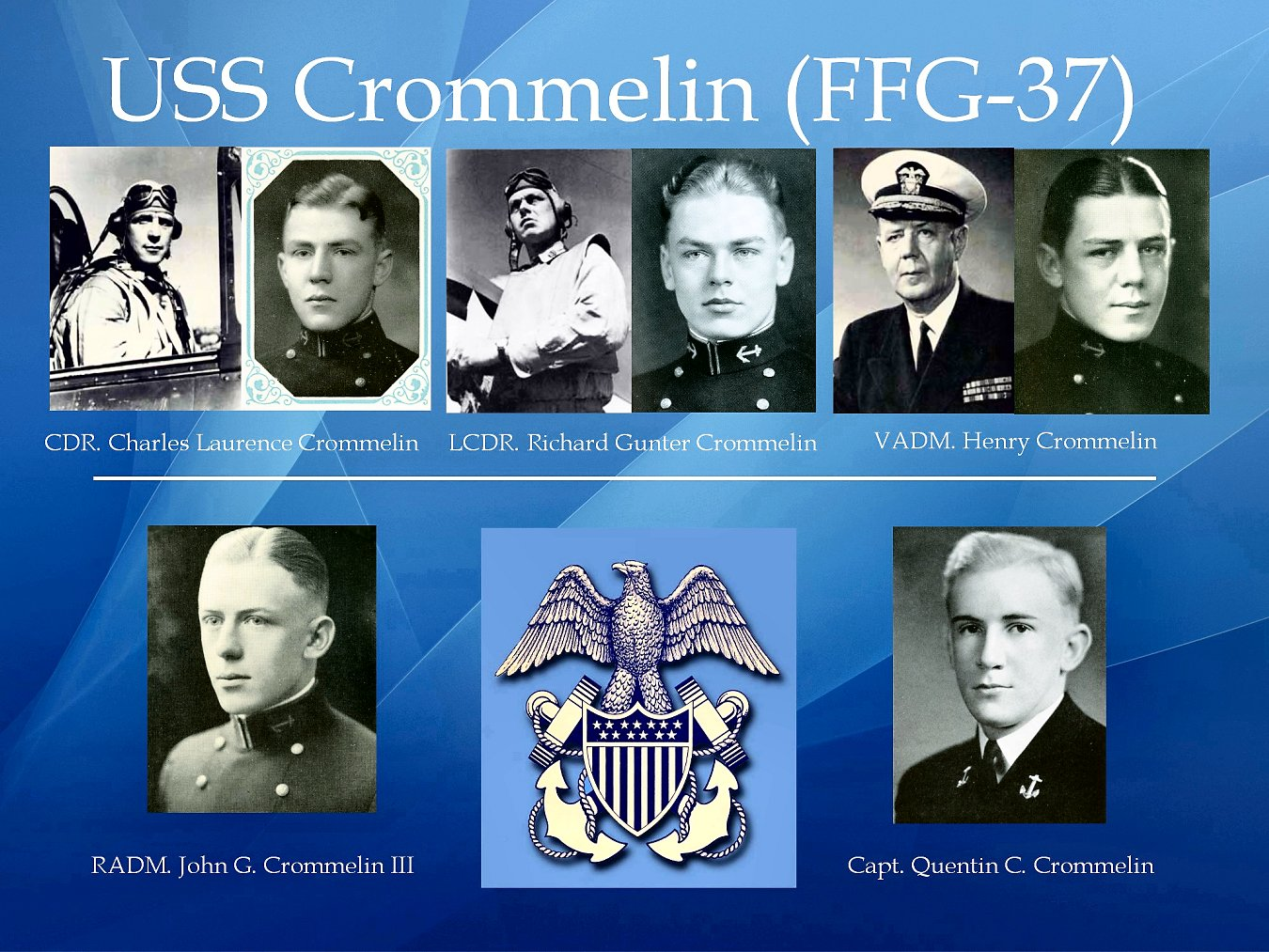
The Crommelin brothers

=== 1980s ===
Crommelin was assigned to Destroyer Squadron 9 and reached its homeport of Long Beach, California in August 1983. Underway from Long Beach on 1 October 1984 to join Battle Group 'DELTA' for COMPTUEX 85–1, HSL-41, Detachment ONE embarked.

On 14 January 1985, the ship was underway from San Diego for READIEX 85–1, the second major fleet exercise for LAMPS MK III, Helicopter Anti-Submarine Squadron Light, Four Three, Detachment ONE embarked USS Crommelin. At sea commander of Battle Group DELTA, Rear Admiral Leon A Edney, USN, Commander Carrier Group 1, embarked aboard the aircraft carrier USS Constellation. Later that year Battle Group Delta, the Constellation Battle Group, deployed to the western Pacific and Indian Oceans. During this deployment, Crommelin became the first guided missile frigate to successfully engage a high-speed, maneuvering target with missiles. Just before reaching Naval Station Subic Bay, the Philippines, Crommelin changed command in the presence of Commander, Carrier Group 1, and Commander, Destroyer Squadron 17. It was also the first ship to complete an operational deployment with the LAMPS MK III weapon system. In June 1986, Crommelin received the first Chief of Naval Operations LAMPS MK III Safety Award.

In the summer of 1986, Crommelin was awarded every departmental and divisional excellence award and won its first Navy "E" award. In 1987, Crommelin was assigned to Destroyer Squadron 13 and began an accelerated deployment with the Constellation battle group. Crommelin was the first FFG to deploy with two LAMPS MK III helicopters embarked. Crommelin was assigned to Commander, Middle East Force from 1 July to 25 August 1987, earning a Meritorious Unit Commendation and Armed Forces Expeditionary Medal for the convoy escort of the first five reflagged Kuwaiti tankers in Operation Earnest Will.

On 1 January 1988, Crommelin was reassigned to Destroyer Squadron 9, and on 6 March 1988, the ship received a second consecutive Navy "E" award. Upon completion of its second availability period at Todd Pacific Shipyard, Crommelin was deployed in March 1989 again to the Persian Gulf.

=== 1990s ===
In October 1990 Crommelin was deployed in support of joint service, counternarcotics operations in the Central, South American, and Caribbean theater. Crommelin was awarded the Joint Meritorious Unit Award for its performance during this deployment. In 1991, Crommelin received the Navy "E" as well as its fifth consecutive warfare excellence awards for anti-air and anti-surface warfare, navigation and seamanship, damage control, engineering, and communications. On 1 September 1991, Crommelin shifted homeports to Pearl Harbor, Hawaii, and joined Destroyer Squadron 31.

Crommelin completed a second four-month counternarcotics deployment in the Central, South American and Caribbean theater from November 1992 to March 1993. Upon return to its homeport of Pearl Harbor, Hawaii, Crommelin was assigned to Commander Naval Surface Group, Middle Pacific.

From 6 July to 14 December 1994, Crommelin was assigned to the Kitty Hawk battle group in the Western Pacific for Korean contingency operations. There, Crommelin received the Meritorious Unit Commendation Award for the prosecution of a Chinese Han class submarine. Upon completion of this deployment she underwent dry-docking SRA-5 at Pearl Harbor Naval Shipyard, following which she began the cycle for her 1996 Western Pacific deployment with the Carl Vinson battle group.

After a three-month work up cycle, Crommelin deployed with the Carl Vinson battle group on 20 May 1996. This deployment took Crommelin and her crew back to the Persian Gulf for a variety of missions, including escorting ships through the Straits of Hormuz, patrolling the Northern Persian Gulf, and conducting maritime interception operations. Crommelin returned from that deployment on 20 November 1996.

Following WESTPAC 96, Crommelin entered SRA-6 from January to March 1997. Crommelin received upgrades to all major weapons systems as well as the engineering plant. Following this availability, Crommelin and her crew began yet another work up cycle to prepare for her fifth deployment to the Persian Gulf as part of the U.S. 5th Fleet. Crommelin departed Pearl Harbor on 21 February 1998. During this deployment Crommelin distinguished herself by setting a Fifth Fleet record for number of vessels boarded and tonnage of illegal Iraqi petroleum seized and diverted.

Crommelin completed a demanding nine-week private sector SRA in early 1999, where she made major repairs and upgrades throughout the ship. Immediately following the SRA, Crommelin aggressively entered the inter-deployment training cycle and proceeded to set numerous records throughout her training. Chief among these was condensing what is normally a twelve-week training cycle into nine weeks. Other achievements were completing cruise missile test qualification on the first day of training and completing engineering qualification with 100% of drills and 28 of 29 evolutions graded as "satisfactory".

With her training cycle complete, Crommelin departed Pearl Harbor on 24 August 1999 for a three-month deployment to the Eastern Pacific in support of counter narcotics operations. During this deployment, Crommelin steamed 77 of 92 days, flew more than 350 mishap-free SH-60B flight hours, and was a key player in four major cocaine seizures. Upon her return to Pearl Harbor on 24 November 1999, Crommelin immediately began the work up cycle for her next deployment with the Abraham Lincoln battle group in August 2000.

=== 2000s ===
In February 2000, Crommelin was awarded the Battle "E" for Destroyer Squadron 31 as well as each of the four command excellence awards. Other accomplishments included the 1999 Commander in Chief, Pacific Fleet Retention Excellence Award, 1999, Commander, Naval Surface Forces Pacific (COMNAVSURFPAC) Surface Ship Safety Award, COMNAVSURFPAC Self-Sufficient Ship of the Quarter Award (Q4 FY99 and Q2 FY00), and the distinction of being the first Pearl Harbor ship to hoist the Enlisted Surface Warfare Specialist Pennant.

During WESTPAC 2000, eighteen non-compliant vessels were boarded by Crommelin's Visit Board Search and Seizure Team, twelve were found to be smuggling petroleum products from Iraq and diverted to friendly ports for disposal of the ships and their illegal cargo. On the eve of the homecoming from deployment, Crommelin received her second consecutive Battle Efficiency Award.

From 18 April 2001 to June 2001, Crommelin was dry-docked at Pearl Harbor Naval Shipyard for Dry-dock Selected Restricted Availability. In January 2002 Crommelin received the 2001 COMNAVSURFPAC Surface Ship Safety Award.

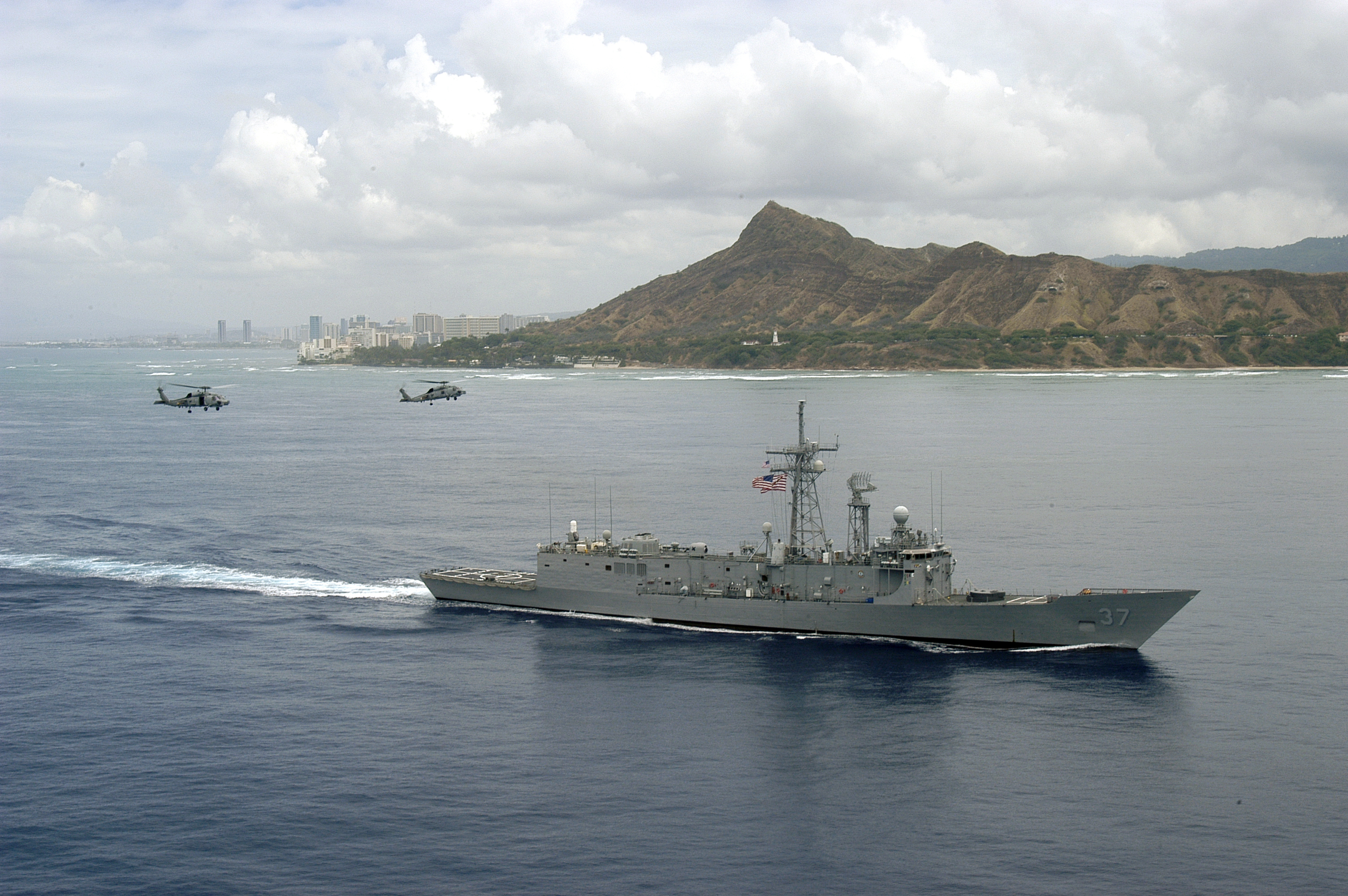
Crommelin outward bound past Diamond Head, May 2004.

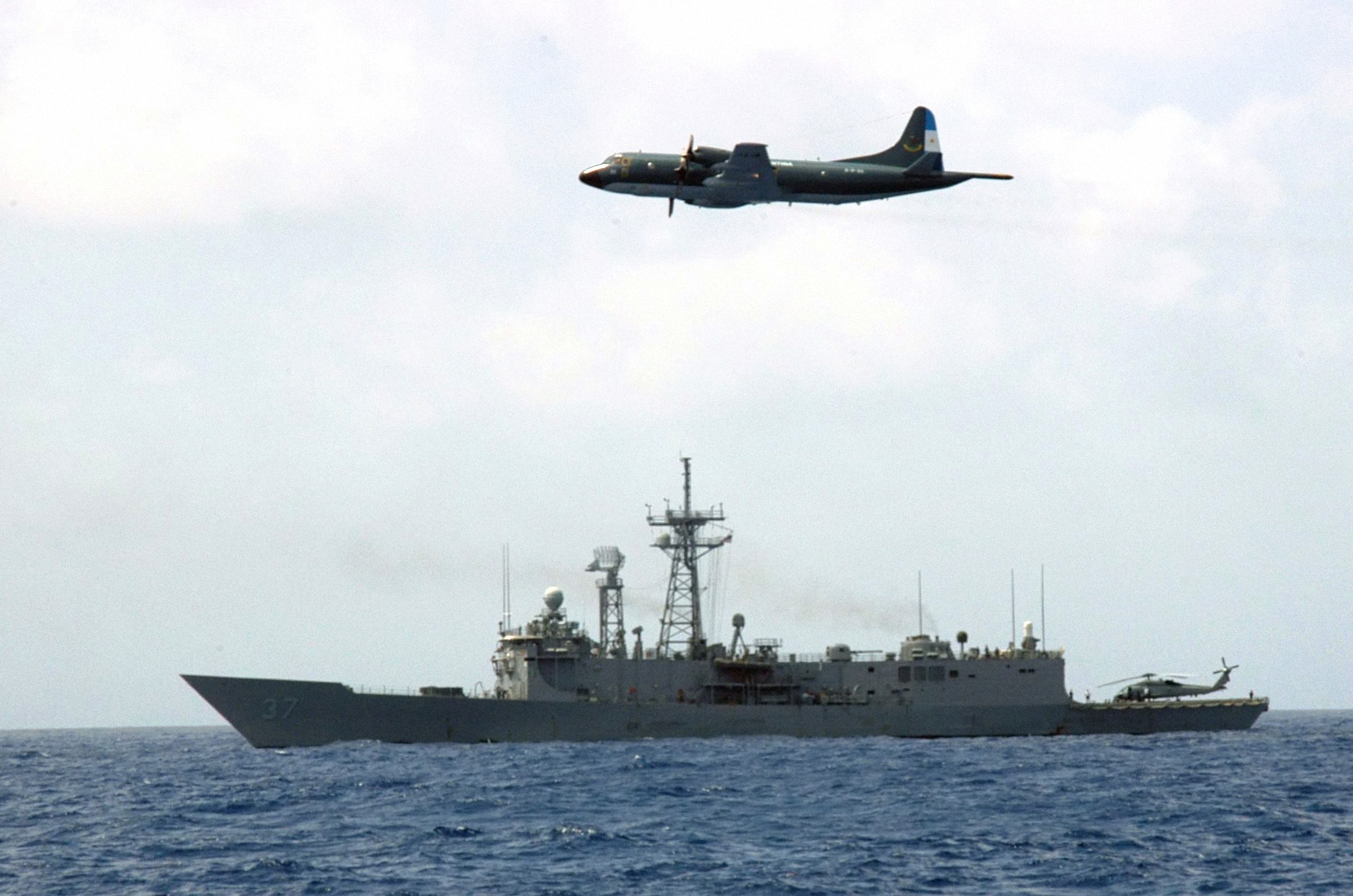
Crommelin with an Argentine Navy P-3 Orion during joint operations at the Panama Canal.

From 12 May 2004 to 12 November 2004, Crommelin was deployed to the SOUTHPAC AOR with Coast Guard Law Enforcement Detachment (LEDET) 105 in support of the war on drugs, conducting counter-narcotics operations in the Pacific Ocean and Caribbean Sea. In that time, she became the most second most successful counter-narcotics ship with the seizure of 44,806 lb (20,324 kg) of cocaine, including 26,369 pounds from the Belize-flagged vessel San Jose on 23 September 2004. She held that record until the bust of the Panamanian flagged motor vessel Gatun off the coast of Panama in March 2007, carrying approximately 42,845 lb (19,434 kg) of cocaine. During this deployment, America's Battle Frigate also participated in exercises UNITAS-04 and PANAMAX-04, training the Navies and Coast Guards of various Central- and South-American countries in counter-narcotics and counter-terrorism tactics at sea.

From 5 May 2006 to 15 September 2006, she participated in CARAT-06, along with Salvor, Tortuga, Hopper and USCGC Sherman. In that time, Task Group 73.1 trained the Navies of several Southeast Asian countries in Maritime boarding and counter-terrorism tactics. Upon returning to home port, she entered an intensive dry dock period and as of May 2007, is preparing herself for continued operations in the wars on terror and drugs.

In November 2007 Crommelin Deployed to the Southcom AOR insupport of CounterNarco-Terrorism Ops (CNT-OPS). On Christmas Eve 2007 Crommelin stopped a 'go-fast' drug runner near the coast of Columbia carrying 5,200 lb (2,400 kg) of cocaine. Crommelin boarded close to 20 vessels involved in drug running operations during her 7-month deployment. Nearing the end of the deployment the frigate was awaiting the arrival of the aircraft carrier USS George Washington into the Eastern Pacific AOR for a refueling operation. As the two ships came alongside each other George Washington had a major fire break out onboard damaging 92 spaces within as well as shutting down part of their nuclear reactor. She quickly made for San Diego to conduct repairs while Crommelin was left short on food and even lower on fuel. The frigate had to make an emergency stop in Mexico to refuel both food and fuel to make it back to Hawaii in June 2008. After a successful deployment Crommelin entered dry dock in October 2008 for repairs to keep her operational throughout the next decade.

=== 2010s and retirement ===
In 2010, Crommelin was again awarded the Battle "E" for Destroyer Squadron 31. Crommelin was decommissioned ahead of schedule at a ceremony in Pearl Harbor, 26 October 2012. Crommelin's last contribution was as a SINKEX target ship during the major multi-nation naval exercise RIMPAC 2016. USS Coronado attempted to hit Crommelin with the first-ever LCS-launched Harpoon surface-to-surface missile. However, the weapon missed. Crommelin succumbed to multiple hits from other SINKEX participants and sank later in the evening on 19 July 2016. Her final resting place is at approximately 23°00′N 159°55′W.

== Ship's crest ==
The colors blue and gold are traditionally associated with the U.S. Navy. The three interlaced chevronels represent the Crommelin brothers after whom the ship is named. The two winged chevronels refer to the air exploits of Lieutenant Commander Richard and Commander Charles Crommelin who served and died as Naval aviators. The central chevronel over which an anchor is placed alludes to the surface ship career of Vice Admiral Henry Crommelin, the second-oldest and first to serve of the brothers.

The linked chevronels suggest the strength and determination of U.S. naval forces in their efforts to regain enemy held territories of the Pacific Ocean throughout World War II. It was in this effort that the Crommelin brothers so distinguished themselves.

The rampant sea lion is a symbolic creature associated with valor at sea; its head and mane are scarlet for courage and its body is gold for zeal and achievement. The scarlet sword recalls the fierce conflict of the Pacific war. The wings and silver collar with blue cross signify some of the decorations the brothers received, such as the Navy Cross, the Silver Star and the Distinguished Flying Cross.
