= January 1993 airstrikes on Iraq =

1993 incident during the Iraqi no-fly zones conflict

January 1993 Air Strikes on Iraq
- Part of the Iraqi no-fly zones conflict and the Persian Gulf Conflicts
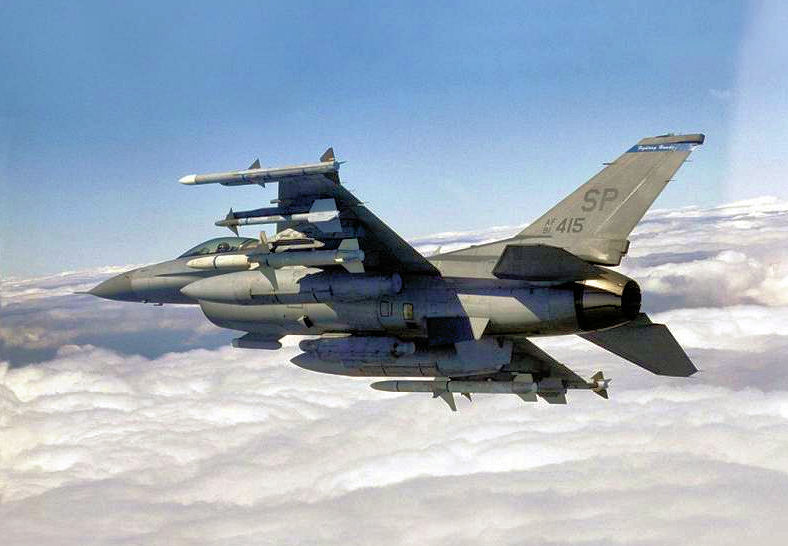
- An F-16C of the 23rd FS in 1992, similar to the one that 1st Lt. Craig Stevenson flew on Jan 17, 1993.
Date	January 13, 1993 – January 22, 1993
Location	Southern Iraq, Northern Iraq
Result	Indecisive: Operation Southern Watch continues

Belligerents
United States; United Kingdom; France	Iraq

Commanders and leaders
(United States) George H. W. Bush (Before January 20) (United States) Bill Clinton (After January 20) (United States) Colin Powell	(Iraq) Saddam Hussein

Strength
1 Kitty Hawk Class Carrier; 3 Cruisers; 1 Type 42 Destroyer; 1 Frigate; 71 Carrier Aircraft Numerous Land Based Aircraft	Numerous AAA and SAM defenses MiG-23 Flogger (Iraqi Air Force)

Casualties and losses
None	1 MiG-23 Flogger; Various SAMs and AAA 1 soldier killed
- 5 civilians dead and 7 wounded

During January 1993, numerous coalition airstrikes occurred against Iraq in response to actions by the latter predominantly due to the No-Fly Zone in Southern Iraq.

== Prelude ==
Just after the Gulf War ended, there were fears that Iraq might invade Kuwait again, especially after Iraqi media declared on August 2, 1992 (The 2nd Anniversary of the Iraqi invasion of Kuwait) that Kuwait was their 19th province and that they would invade again. This coupled with some incidents of Iraqi troops making incursions and exchanging fire with Kuwaiti troops led to the no-fly zone on the 32nd Parallel being enacted on August 26, 1992, with U.S. Navy F/A-18C Hornets of Carrier Air Wing Five from the aircraft carrier USS Independence being the first to fly into the zone. There were at least 70 fixed aircraft of the Iraqi Air Force assumed to be based in the No-Fly Zone at the time.

On December 27, 1992, at 10:42 am, two Iraqi MiG-25PDS Foxbat-Es entered the No-Fly Zone. 65 seconds later, one of them was shot down by a United States Air Force (USAF) F-16DG Fighting Falcon (90-0778) of the 33rd FS (363rd FW) in what was also the first air-to-air kill for the AIM-120 AMRAAM and the first beyond-visual-range missile kill for the F-16 as well as the first air-to-air kill by an American F-16.

As a result of the shoot down, the Kitty Hawk Battlegroup sailed from the coast of Somalia to the Persian Gulf. The Kitty Hawk also dispatched its 18 aircraft from its two F/A-18A squadrons to join USAF aircraft in Saudi Arabia.

== January 13 air strike ==
On the evening 13th of January, in response to the moving of surface-to-air missile (SAM) sites into Southern Iraq in the No-Fly Zone, 75 Coalition aircraft, protected by Type 42 Guided Missile Destroyer HMS Nottingham, along with 35 aircraft from CVW-15 on the USS Kitty Hawk (CV-63) took off to attack the sites, making a total of 115 aircraft in all. The USAF aircraft included six F-117A Nighthawks from the 49th FW, eight F-16C Block 42 aircraft from the 33rd FS (363rd FW), four F-111F Aardvarks, three EF-111A Ravens, six F-4G Phantoms, ten F-15E Strike Eagles from the 335th FS (4th FW) and eight F-15C Eagles from the 1st FW flying escort. They were joined by six Royal Air Force (RAF) Tornado GR.1 aircraft (four had FLIR designators) as well as six French Mirage 2000 aircraft for combat air patrol and numerous support aircraft like AWACS.

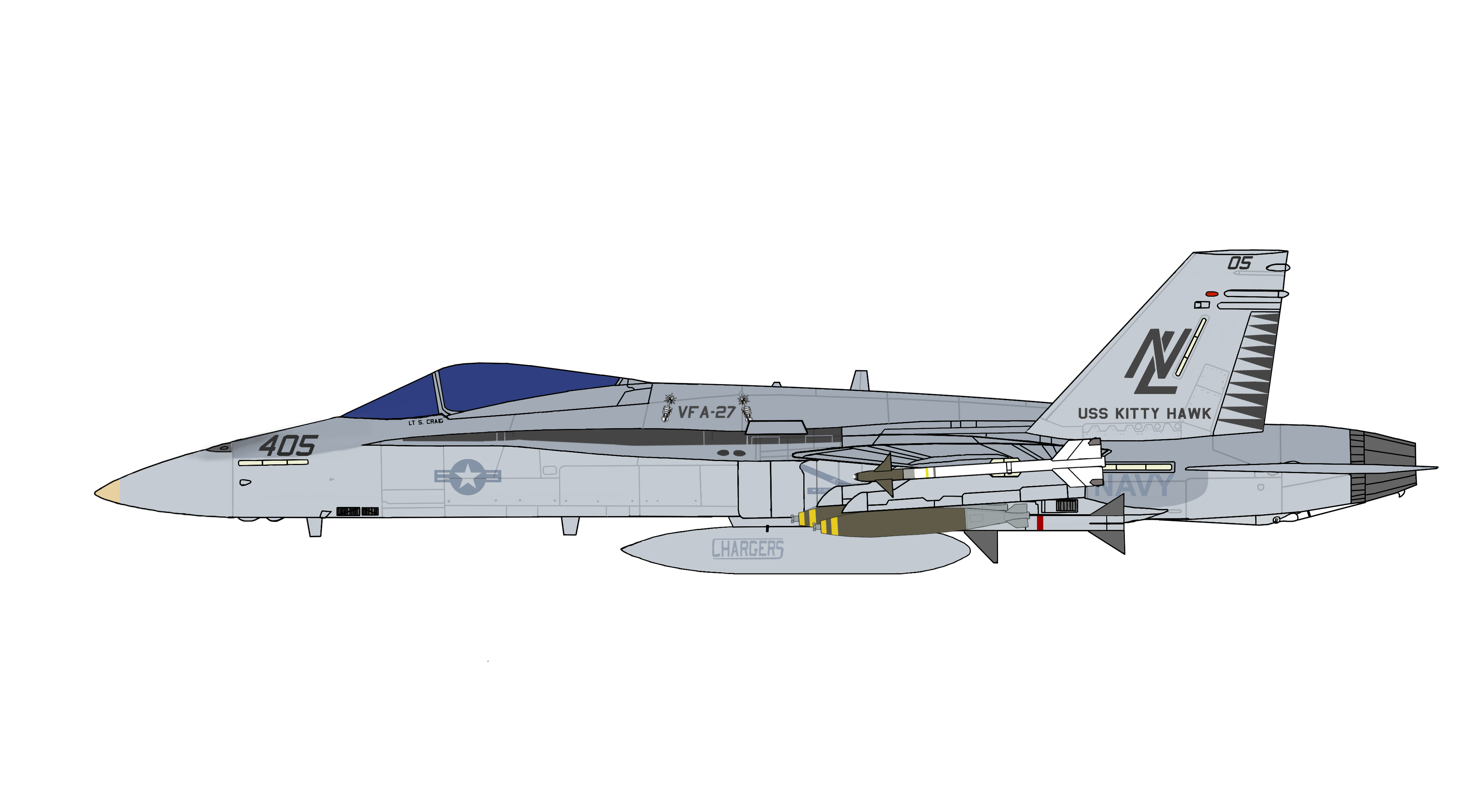
NL-405, one of the aircraft of VFA-27 that took part in the January 13, 1993, air strike, was loaded with Mk.83 bombs.

There were also around 35 aircraft from the Kitty Hawk including eight A-6E SWIP Intruder aircraft from VA-52 (which employed GBU-10 laser guided bombs), eight F/A-18As from VFA-27 and VFA-97 (including CDR. Kevin J. Thomas, Commanding Officer of VFA-97 who led the air strike as well as two of the F/A-18As for escort and four providing SAM suppression), four F-14A Tomcats from VF-51 and VF-111, three EA-6B Prowlers from VAQ-134, an S-3B Viking from VS-37 for electronic support, and two E-2C Hawkeyes from VAW-114. Targets included radar stations and integrated air operations centers at Tallil Air Base (known to house MiG-29s), Al Amara, Najaf, Samawah and four mobile anti-aircraft SAM/anti-aircraft artillery (AAA) sites.

At around 6:45 pm, the air strikes began when the Kitty Hawk launched her strike package. During the transit to the target area, the F-14As from CVW-15's strike package had to travel more than 644 km (400 miles) to reach a tanker aircraft to avoid alerting Iraqi Air Defence commanders. Despite this, they were able to support the carrier strike aircraft during mission as well as 40 minutes after the last bomb.

The air strikes only lasted 30 minutes and only light AAA was encountered. The results of the strike were considered poor with many targets being missed. The Aerospace Daily claimed that of four mobile missile batteries, only one was destroyed. Of the six F-117As, two lost laser lock, one failed to get a positive identification of the target, and one F-117 hit the wrong target. An F-15E also returned to base with its ordnance due to cloud cover preventing a laser-guided drop. An Iraqi news agency soon reported that an Iraqi soldier as well as three civilians were killed as well as 7 civilians wounded.

== Action on January 17 ==
A cruise missile strike was launched by the Kitty Hawk Battlegroup on the 17th on the Zafraniyah Nuclear Fabrication Facility, 8 miles or 13 km southwest of Baghdad. Around 44 to 45 Tomahawk missiles were launched from four vessels with 37 of them hitting their intended targets. One Tomahawk was hit by AAA and crashed into the Rasheed Hotel in Baghdad, killing two civilians. The US Navy stated that the single loss to AAA was due to the Tomahawks flying the same routes over Baghdad they had used during the Gulf War. They also reported that the warhead didn't explode and rather that it was the impact that caused the civilian casualties.

On that same day, a formation of F-16Cs along with F-4Gs were to conduct reconnaissance operations, provide SAM suppression for RAF Jaguars investigating a newly discovered SA-6 SAM site, combat air patrol operations until being relieved by another F-4/F-16 Wild Weasel hunter/killer team and return to base. Total sortie length was scheduled for just under five hours. During the phase that required the taking out of SAM sites, an F-16C Block 30 of the 23rd FS (52nd FW) piloted by 1st Lt. Craig Stevenson saw what was described as the "unmistakable radar return" of an enemy aircraft rolling down the runway, heading in his direction, about 30 nm away. With the help of AWACS, he shot down the enemy aircraft with an AIM-120 AMRAAM (the second air-to-air kill for the AMRAAM and the F-16) which was originally believed to be a MiG-29B Fulcrum-A (later confirmed to be a MiG-23 Flogger). Originally, the first AMRAAM did not fire and stayed on the left wing requiring Stevenson to fire his second one. The live missile on the left wing was a concern for him, posing a risk when he was required to refuel from a KC-135 Stratotanker.

== January 19 incident ==
On the 19th, an F-4G fired an AGM-88 HARM at an Iraqi SAM site after a 14 nm lock-on east of Mosul. An hour later, an F-16C was fired upon by AAA but not hit. Two hours later a section of F-16C's were fired upon and dropped cluster bombs on guns north of Mosul. Iraq then later called a cease fire to celebrate Clinton's inauguration which took place on 20 January.

== January 21/22 incident ==
Around 17 hours after President Bill Clinton took office, a hunter/killer team of two F-4Gs and two F-16Cs struck an Iraqi SAM site at on 21 January 1993 at 5:09 am EST (January 22, 1993 - 1:09 am). The two Wild Weasel (F-4G) aircraft were escorting French Air Force Mirage F1 aircraft configured for reconnaissance. These Mirages were on a "routine monitoring mission" north of the 36th Parallel near Mosul when the aircraft were attacked by ground fire. The aircraft were then painted by an Iraqi SAM radar and in return, one of the F-4Gs launched an AGM-88 HARM missile 12 miles or 19 km north of Mosul.

== January 23 incident ==
On January 23, 1993, Iraqi AAA allegedly (flashes were reported from the air) fired at an A-6E SWIP Intruder from VA-52 as well as at two F/A-18As (all from the Kitty Hawk). In retaliation, the Intruder dropped a GBU-16 Paveway II laser guided bomb, destroying it. This was the last time the A-6 Intruder was used in combat.

== See also ==
- June 1993 cruise missile strike in Iraq
- Operation Desert Strike (1996)
- Operation Desert Fox
- February 2001 airstrike in Iraq
