= VA-52 (U.S. Navy) =

Turtle Herders

Attack Squadron 52
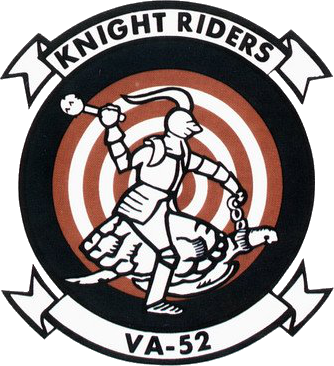
- VA-52 squadron patch
- Active: 20 July 1950 – 31 March 1995
- Country: United States
- Branch: United States Navy
- Nickname: Knight Riders
- Engagements: Korean War; Vietnam War; Operation Earnest Will; Operation Restore Hope; Operation Southern Watch; 1994 North Korean nuclear crisis

Aircraft flown
- Attack: F4U-4 Corsair; F9 Panther; F9F Cougar; AD Skyraider; A-6/KA-6 Intruder

VA-52 was an Attack Squadron of the U.S. Navy. It was established as U.S. Navy Reserve Fighter Squadron VF-884 on 1 November 1949, and called to active duty on 20 July 1950. It was redesignated VF-144 on 4 February 1953, and VA-52 on 23 February 1959. The squadron was nicknamed the Bitter Birds from about 1951–1953, and the Knightriders from about 1960 onward. Its insignia evolved through several versions and variations from 1951 to the 1980s. VA-52 was decommissioned on 31 March 1995.

== History ==
=== 1950s ===
On 20 July 1950, VF-884 (the previous name of VA-52) was called to active duty as a result of the Korean War. On the 28th, the squadron reported for active duty at NAS San Diego. In the later part of March 1951, VF-884 aircraft conducted their first combat operations, flying close air support missions along Korea’s eastern coast from USS Boxer.

VF-884's first Commanding Officer, LCDR. G. F. Carmichael, died after parachuting from his F4U which had been hit by enemy ground fire on 24 May 1951. Later, on 4 October 1951, LT. E. F. Johnson was attacked and shot down by enemy MiG-15 aircraft. This was the first VF-884 and CVG-101 aircraft shot down by enemy aircraft. LCDR. Bowen, VF-884's third Commanding Officer, was listed as missing in action when his aircraft crashed near Pyongyang, North Korea on November 8, 1951.

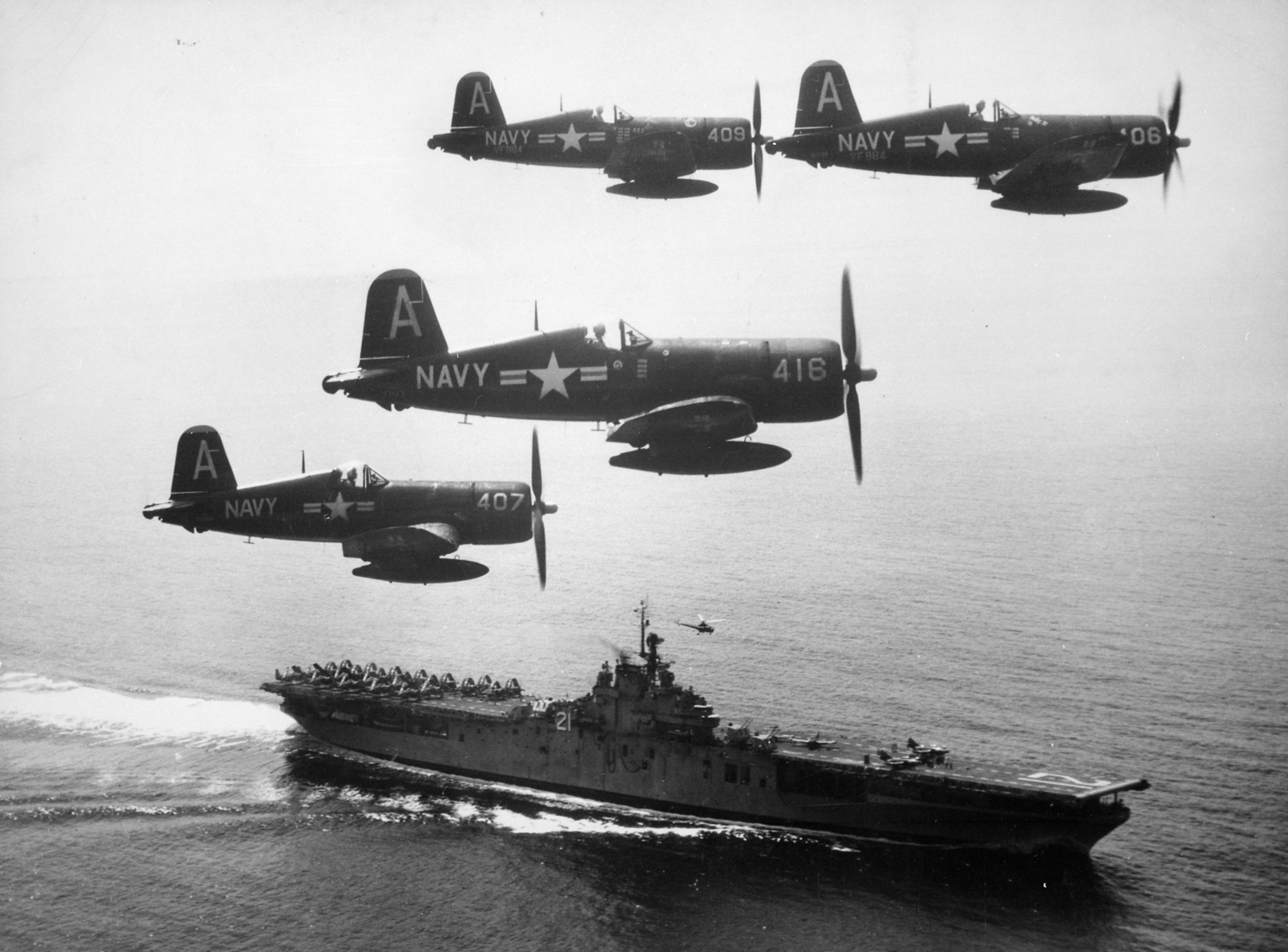
F4U-4 Corsairs from VF-884 over USS Boxer, in 1951.

On 4 February 1953: VF-884 was redesignated VF-144 during its second combat tour in Korea aboard USS Kearsarge. In this change, the reserve squadron number was replaced by an active squadron number. On 21 February 1953: VF-144 completed the last line period of its second combat tour in Korea. Its primary missions had been close air support of ground troops, interdiction of enemy main supply routes, and the destruction of military supplies, vehicles and troops.

On 18 August 1958, the squadron returned to NAS Miramar following USS Ranger's first major deployment. The cruise took the squadron from Virginia to California, via Cape Horn, transferring Ranger from the Atlantic Fleet to the Pacific Fleet. The squadron's mission was changed to attack and it was redesignated VA-52 on 23 February 1959.

=== 1960s ===
From 13 July to 1 August 1964, VA-52 aircraft participated in Yankee Team operations in South Vietnam and Laos, involving aerial reconnaissance to detect Communist military presence and operations. Other missions included weather reconnaissance and Search and Rescue. Between the 2nd and 4 August 1964, during a Desoto Patrol mission (intelligence collection missions begun in 1962), USS Maddox was attacked by three motor torpedo boats off the coast of North Vietnam. Following this incident the squadron flew 44 sorties in support of the destroyers on the Desoto Patrol. On the 4th of August, During the night, two destroyers on Desoto Patrol, USS Turner Joy and USS Maddox, believing themselves under attack by North Vietnamese motor torpedo boats, called for air support. Several A-1H Skyraiders from the squadron, along with several F-8 Crusaders, were launched from USS Ticonderoga. Commander George H. Edmondson and Lieutenant Jere A. Barton reported gun flashes and bursts of light at their altitude which they felt came from enemy antiaircraft fire. Following this, on 5 August 1964, four VA-52 A-1Hs, piloted by Commander L. T. McAdams, Lieutenant Commander L. E. Brumbach and Lieutenant (jg)s R. E. Moore and P. A. Carter, participated in Operation Pierce Arrow, retaliatory strikes against North Vietnam. Along with other aircraft from CVG-5, they struck the Vinh oil storage facilities and destroyed about ninety percent of the complex. The four aircraft returned with no battle damage. Between 6–29 October 1964: The squadron conducted rescue combat air patrol missions in support of "Yankee Team" operations.

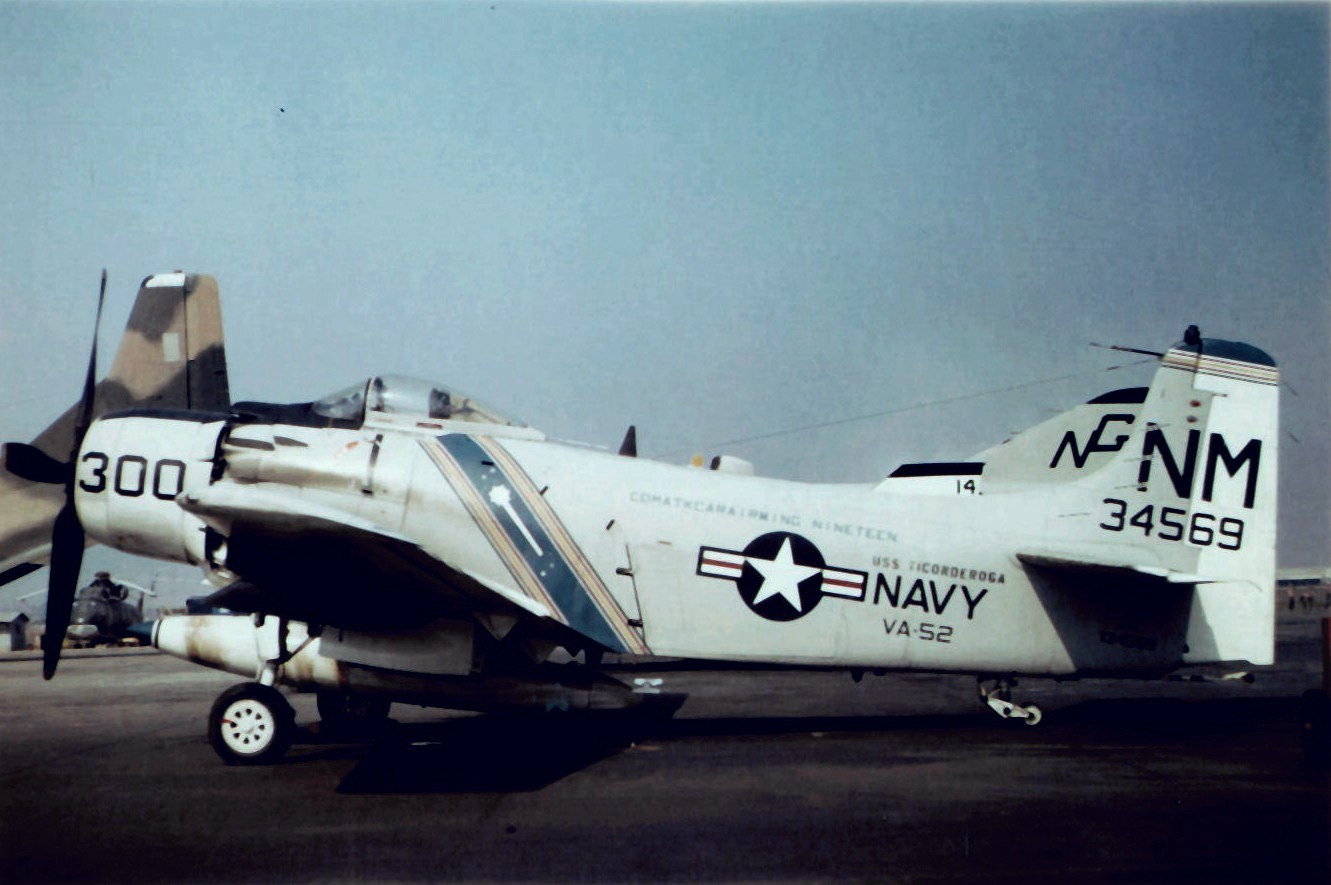
A VA-52 A-1H Skyraider in 1966.

On 7 February 1966, LTJG. Harvey M. Browne was awarded the Silver Star for conspicuous gallantry and intrepidity during rescue missions in the Republic of Vietnam. On 13 April 1966, CDR. John C. Mape was killed in action, becoming the third VA-52 commanding officer to be lost in combat action. The squadron soon completed its second combat tour of duty in Vietnam on the 21st of April, having participated in Operation Rolling Thunder, designed to interdict the enemy's lines of communication into Laos and South Vietnam.

On 9 March 1967, CDR. John F. Wanamaker received the Silver Star for conspicuous gallantry and intrepidity during operations against North Vietnam. VA-52 completed its last day of line operations during its 1967 and third combat tour to Vietnamon April 27. During this deployment, squadron operations included rescue combat air patrol missions, coastal reconnaissance, Operation Steel Tiger missions and Operation Sea Dragon operations. Steel Tiger involved concentrated strikes in southern Laos. Sea Dragon involved spotting for naval gunfire support against waterborne cargo and coastal radar and gun battery sites. On 7 September 1968: VA-52 deployed aboard USS Coral Sea. This was the first A-6 Intruder deployment aboard a Midway-class aircraft carrier.

=== 1970s ===
From 8 December 1970 to 23 June 1971, VA-52's main emphasis was on operations in Laos against the enemy's lines of communication and their transportation networks. On 23 November 1971, CDR. Lennart R. Salo became the first Naval Flight Officer to command an A-6 Intruder squadron.

VA-52 commenced line operations from Yankee Station a few days earlier than scheduled on 3 April 1972, as a result of the North Vietnamese invasion on 30 March. During this line period heavy air raids were conducted against North Vietnam. These were the first major heavy air raids into North Vietnam since October 1968 and became known as Operation Freedom Train. On 16 April 1972, VA-52 conducted strikes in the Haiphong, Vinh, and Thanh Hoa as part of Operation Freedom Porch.

VA-52's Intruders took part in Operation Pocket Money, the mining of Haiphong harbor, on 9 May 1970. VA-52's Intruders actually took part in the diversionary attack at Phu Qui railroad yard while aircraft from Coral Sea conducted the actual mining. On 10 May 1972: Operation Linebacker operations began and involved concentrated air strikes against targets in North Vietnam above the 20th parallel north. During these operations VA-52's aircraft flew armed reconnaissance, Alpha strikes (large coordinated attacks), mine seeding operations, tanker operations, and Standard ARM sorties (use of anti-radiation missiles to destroy missile radar sites). From 1 June until 27 June 1972, VA-52 flew special single aircraft night missions designated Sneaky Pete as part of Operation Linebacker operations.

VA-52 once again deployed with CVW-11 aboard USS Kitty Hawk on 23 November 1972, this time as part of the first CV concept air wing on the West Coast. VA-52's Intruders were equipped with new ASW electronic equipment, the Multi-Channel Jezebel Relay pods. Between July 24 and 28 1979, VA-52 and other elements of CVW-15 participated in search and assistance operations to aid Vietnamese boat people.

A total of 114 people were rescued through the efforts of the air wing and Kitty Hawk. These operations continued during August. On 27 October 1979, South Korea’s President Park Chung Hee was assassinated and Kitty Hawk immediately departed the Philippine Sea for the southwest coast of Korea, where they remained until 4 November.

While in port at Naval Station Subic Bay in the Philippines and preparing to return home from a seven-month WESTPAC deployment, Kitty Hawk and its battle group (to include CVW-15 and VA-52) were indefinitely extended on deployment on 18 November 1979 in response to the Iran hostage crisis and directed to proceed to the Indian Ocean via the Straits of Malacca and Diego Garcia. Between 3 December 1979 and 23 January 1980, After the assault on the American Embassy in Tehran and the Iran hostage crisis; Kitty Hawk entered the Indian Ocean and operated in the Arabian Sea throughout this period. It was during this period on 29 December 1979, while conducting operations off Kitty Hawk, the squadron's commanding officer, CDR. Walter D. Williams, and one of the squadron's department heads, Lieutenant Commander Bruce Miller, were lost at sea/CDR Williams body recovered, LCDR Miller was not, following a cold catapult shot off the bow in KA-6D Intruder, NL-521 (BuNo 152632).

=== 1980s ===
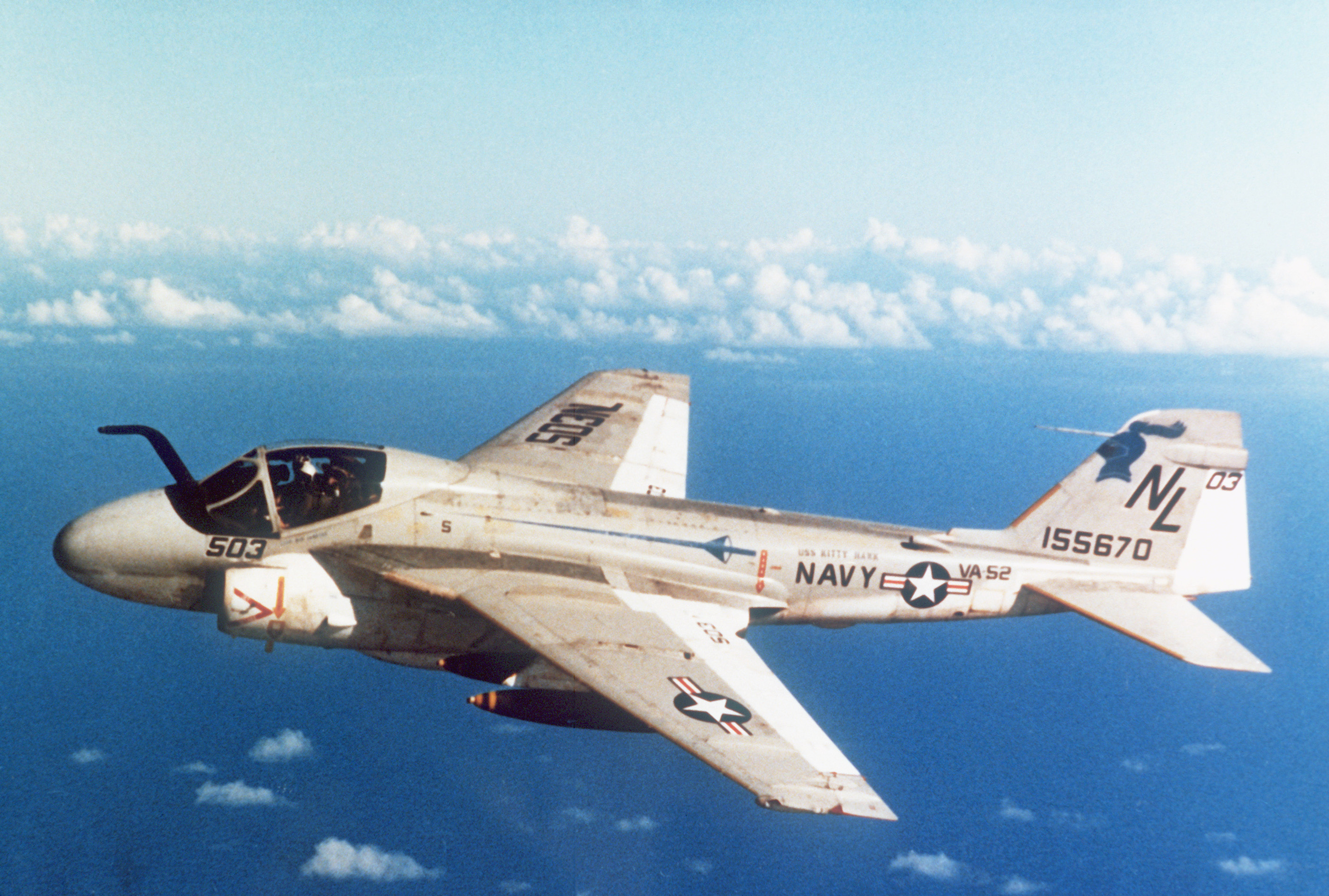
An A-6E Intruder from VA-52, in 1981.

On 8 February 1980, after brief port calls at NAVSTA Subic Bay and NAVBASE Pearl Harbor, Hawaii, Kitty Hawk returns to its homeport of NAS North Island in San Diego, California and VA-52 returns to its home station of NAS Whidbey Island, Washington. On 19 May 1981, while transiting the South China Sea VA-52 aircraft spotted a small boat with 47 Vietnamese refugees on board and reported their location for rescue operations.

USS Carl Vinson CVN-70, with CVW-15 and VA-52, were kept on station in the Sea of Japan between 10 and 12 October 1983, after the attempted assassination of South Korea's president. Between 14 and 31 August 1986, VA-52 participated in the first carrier operations in the Bering Sea since World War II. Most of the squadron's 400 hours and 200 sorties were made under adverse weather conditions. From 20 January to 31 January 1987, VA-52 conducted its second period of operations in the Northern Pacific and Bering Sea. At one point the most effective means of clearing snow and ice from Carl Vinson's flight deck was the jet exhaust from the squadron's aircraft. On 23 September 1987, during night operations off Carl Vinson the squadron's Commanding Officer, CDR. Lloyd D. Sledge, was lost at sea. In August 1988, the squadron flew sorties in support of Operation Earnest Will, the escorting of reflagged Kuwait tankers in the Persian Gulf.

VA-52 received the Systems Weapons Integration Program (SWIP) upgrade of the A-6E TRAM Intruder in March 1989.

=== 1990s ===
In 1991, the squadron became the first Pacific Fleet Intruder squadron to use night-vision goggles on the A-6 Intruder. That same year, CVW-15 moved back to Kitty Hawk

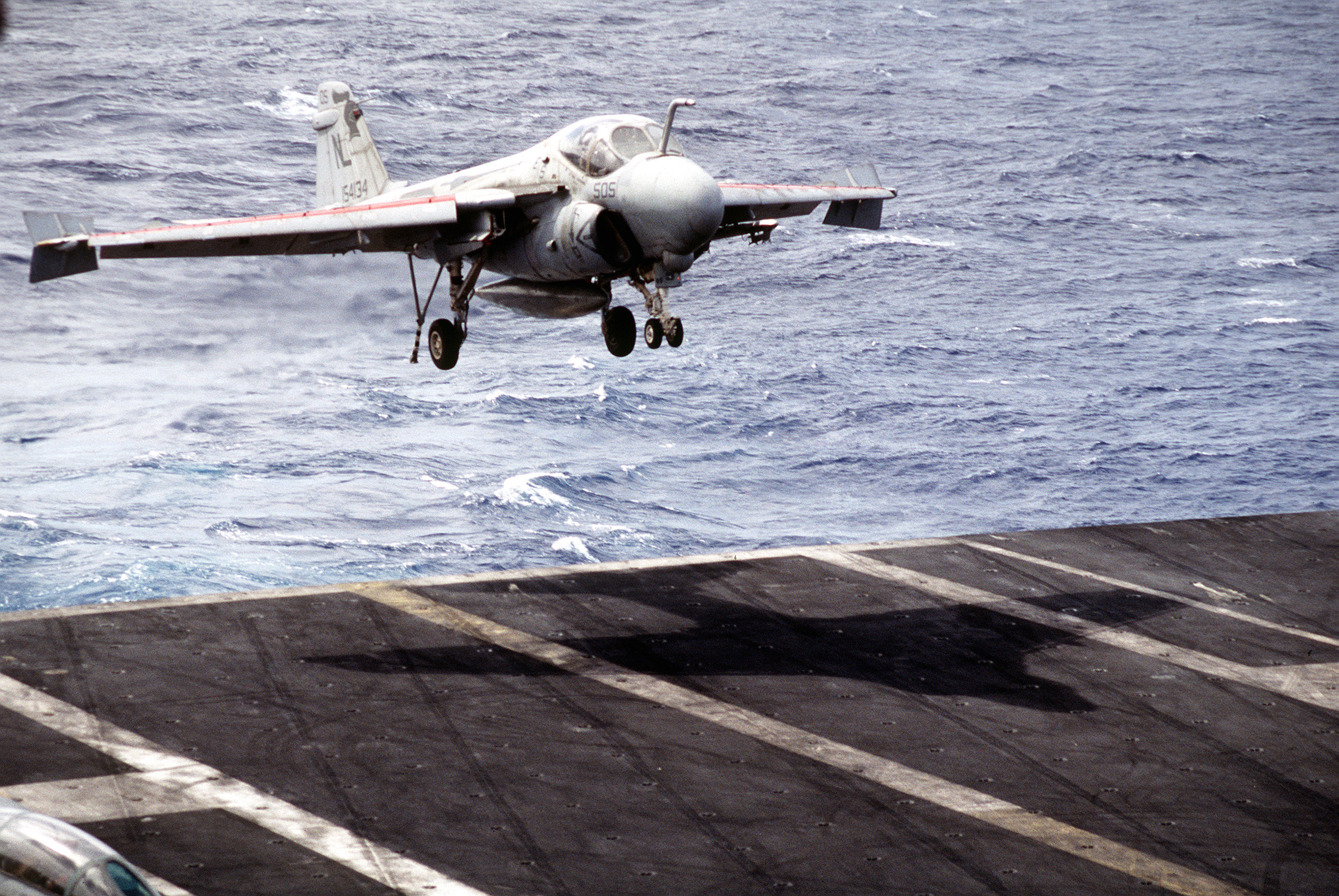
An A-6E SWIP Intruder from VA-52 landing aboard the USS Kitty Hawk in 1994

On 3 November 1992, VA-52 and CVW-15 deployed aboard the Kitty Hawk for their 1992-1993 Deployment. Relieving the Ranger on 18 December as part of JTF Somalia, VA-52 along VFA-27 and VFA-97 (which flew the F/A-18A) undertook Close Air Support and Reconnaissance as part of Operation Restore Hope. This included sending two of the squadron's Intruders to support USMC and Belgian paratroopers during an assault on Kisamayu on 20 December 1992.

On 27 December 1992, as a result of the shooting down of a MiG-25 of the Iraqi Air Force in the No-Fly Zone, the Kitty Hawk, VA-52 and CVW-15 were redirected to the Persian Gulf to take part in Operation Southern Watch. On the evening of January 13, 1993, eight A-6E SWIP Intruders from VA-52 loaded with Paveway bombs attacked Iraqi Air Defence sites in Southern Iraq along with 110 other aircraft, 35 of them from CVW-15. During the strike, CMDR. Rick Hess from VA-52 was among one of four of the Kitty Hawk's pilots who reported seeing Iraqi SAMs. On January 19, 1993, VA-52 destroyed targets in Iraq in retaliation for AAA fire.

In 1994, VA-52 deployed on its last WESTPAC deployment. During the deployment, it was diverted from going to the Persian Gulf, with the carrier instead being diverted to the Korean Peninsula during a crisis revolving around tensions between the two countries. On March 31, 1995, VA-52 Knightriders was disestablished.

== Home port assignments ==
The squadron was assigned to these home ports, effective on the dates shown:

- NAS Olathe – 1 Nov 1949
- NAS San Diego – 28 Jul 1950
- NAS Miramar – Mar 1953
- NAS Moffett Field – 15 Jan 1962
- NAS Alameda – 29 Aug 1963
- NAS Whidbey Island – 1 Jul 1967

== Aircraft assignment ==
The squadron first received the following aircraft in the months shown:

- F8F-1 Bearcat – The squadron was not assigned aircraft before its call to active duty. Pilots trained in and flew F8F-1s that were assigned to the air station where the squadron was home ported.
- F4U-4 Corsair – 1 Aug 1950
- F9F-5 Panther – Apr 1953
- F9F-4 Panther and F9F-6 Cougar – The squadron operated a few of these models in the mid-1950s.
- F9F-8B Cougar – Apr 1956
- F9F-8 Cougar – Aug 1956
- AD-5 Skyraider – Dec 1958
- AD-6 Skyraider – Dec 1958 (AD-6 designation was changed to A-1H in 1962.)
- AD-7 Skyraider – Mar 1959 (AD-7 designation was changed to A-1J in 1962.)
- A-6A Intruder – 10 Nov 1967
- A-6B Intruder – Oct 1970
- KA-6D Intruder – 3rd quarter 1971
- A-6E Intruder – Jul 1974
- A-6E TRAM Intruder - 1982
- A-6E SWIP Intruder - Mar 1989 (First to Pacific fleet squadron to receive night vision versions in 1991)

== See also ==
- Attack aircraft
- History of the United States Navy
- List of inactive United States Navy aircraft squadrons
