= VAW-114 =

World Famous Hormel Hawgs

Carrier Airborne Early Warning Squadron 114
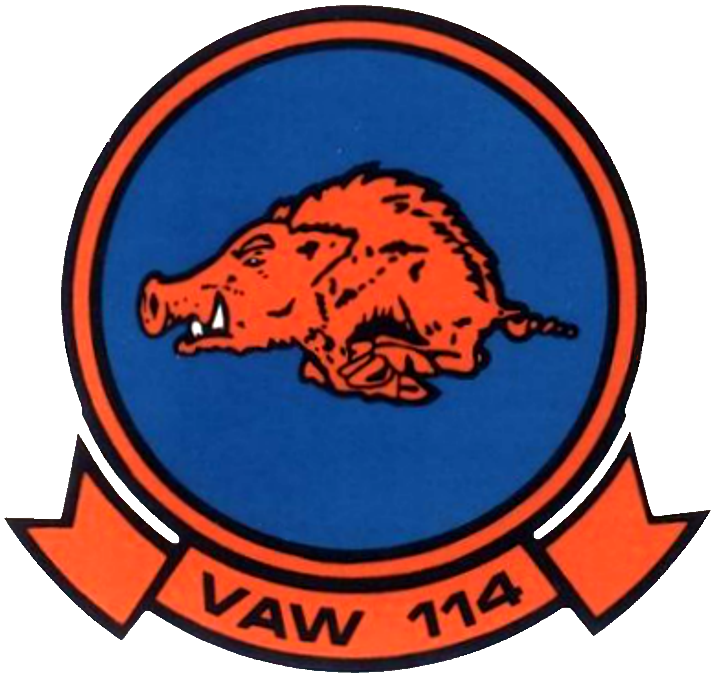
- Active: 20 April 1967 – 31 March 1995
- Country: United States of America
- Branch: United States Navy
- Type: Airborne Early Warning
- Garrison/HQ: NAS Miramar
- Nickname: "Hormel Hawgs"
- Engagements: Vietnam War; Operation Eagle Claw; Operation Earnest Will; Operation Restore Hope; Operation Southern Watch; *January 1993 airstrikes on Iraq; 1994 North Korean nuclear crisis

Aircraft flown
- Electronic warfare: E-2A/B/C Hawkeye

Carrier Airborne Early Warning Squadron 114 (VAW-114), nicknamed the "Hormel Hawgs". It was established on 20 April 1967, based out of NAS North Island, at which time it was already flying missions over the Tonkin Gulf in Vietnam. The squadron was disestablished on 31 March 1995 while based at NAS Miramar.

== Squadron history ==
=== 1960s-70s ===
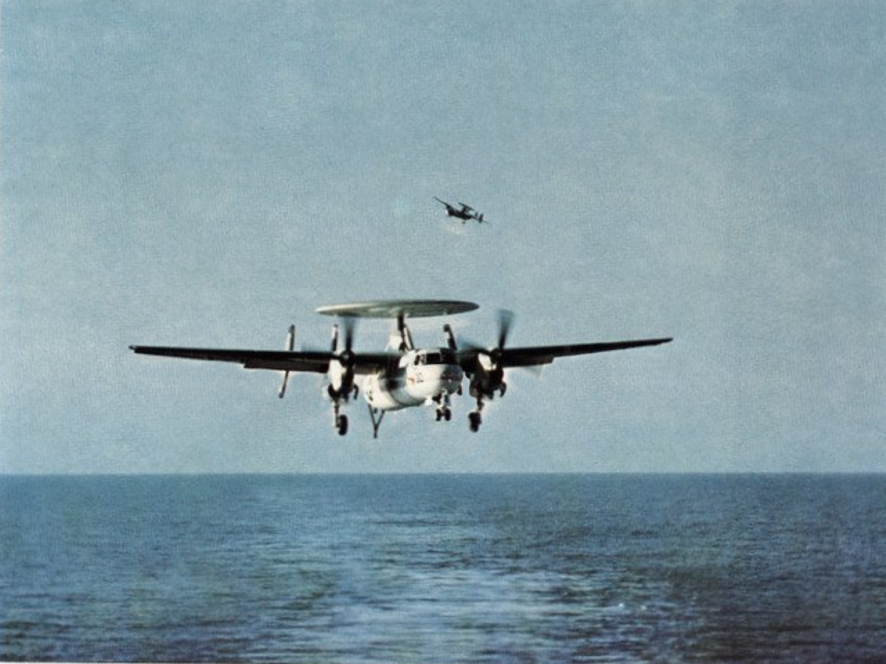
E-2B Hawkeyes of VAW-114 approach USS Kitty Hawk (CV-63)

VAW-114 was formed from Detachment C of VAW-11. It was operating E-2A Hawkeye early warning aircraft as part of Carrier Air Wing Eleven on board USS Kitty Hawk, protecting U.S. naval and air forces that were striking targets in Vietnam. During the war, the squadron made three more war zone deployments before joining Carrier Air Wing Fifteen aboard USS Coral Sea. By 1976, it had moved to NAS Miramar. In 1978, it rejoined the USS Kitty Hawk in the Arabian Sea in response to the Iran hostage crisis.

=== 1980s ===
In 1982, it joined the USS Carl Vinson, making six deployments by 1990. It then made five deployments to the Northern and Western Pacific and the Indian Ocean. In 1988, it supported Operation Earnest Will, escorting oil tankers during the Iran–Iraq War.

=== 1990s ===
In 1990 and 1991, VAW-114 upgraded to the E-2C+ version of the Hawkeye and made two drug-interdiction deployments to Howard Air Force Base in Panama.

In 1992, VAW-114 was assigned to CVW-15 and accompanied the USS Kitty Hawk for its around the horn deployment from NS Norfolk to NAS North Island. VAW-114 participated in RIMPAC in 1992.

In November 1992, VAW-114 deployed with CVW-15/CV-63 for WESTPAC/Indian Ocean and the Persian Gulf. During this deployment, VAW-114 participated in Operation Restore Hope in Somalia and Operation Southern Watch. This included providing AEW support during the January 13, 1993 Air Strike. VAW-114 returned to NAS Miramar in May 1993. In June 1993, VAW-114 deployed to Howard Air Force Panama for drug interdiction duty.

In June 1994, VAW-114 left NAS Miramar for its final deployment. This deployment consisted of patrolling the waters around Korea aboard the Kitty Hawk. VAW-114 returned to NAS Miramar in December 1994. The Navy's post-Cold War reductions marked the end of the "Hormel Hawgs", which was officially disestablished on 31 March 1995, after almost 28 years of service.

== See also ==
- History of the United States Navy
- List of inactive United States Navy aircraft squadrons
