= VS-37 =

Sea Control Squadron 37
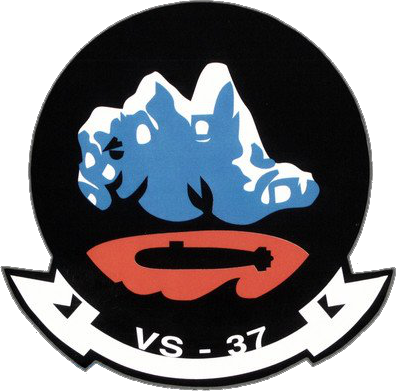
- Active: 1946 (as VA-76E) - 1 March 1995
- Country: United States of America
- Branch: United States Navy
- Role: Anti-Submarine Warfare
- Garrison/HQ: NAS North Island
- Equipment: TBM-3S/W Avenger S-2 Tracker AF-2 Guardian S-3A/B Viking
- Engagements: Cold War; Korean War; Vietnam War; Operation Earnest Will; Operation Desert Shield; Operation Restore Hope; Operation Southern Watch; 1994 North Korean nuclear crisis 1994 Yellow Sea incident

Sea Control Squadron 37 or VS-37 also known as the "Sawbucks" was an Anti Submarine Warfare squadron that was decommissioned in 1995 along with CVW-15. During its active history, it flew during the Korean and Vietnam Wars as well as operating the last S-2 Trackers inservice with the US Navy in 1975.

== History ==
=== Pre VS-37 (1946–1953) ===
VS-37 was established as Attack Reverse Squadron VA-76E in 1946 at NAS Oakland, California (Now Oakland International Airport). The squadron then changed to VC-871 (Composite Squadron) before being changed to Anti Submarine Warfare Squadron 871 or "VS-871". While based at NAS Los Alamitos, the squadron was called to active duty to take part in the Korean War. Between 28 October 1952, and 9 February 1953, the squadron made a deployment to the region with the TBM-3S/W Avenger on board USS Bataan. The squadron then switched to the USS Badoeng Strait for the rest of their time in the Korean War until 26 May 1953, when they returned home.

=== VS-37 during the 1950s (1953-1959) ===
VS-871 changed to the designation of VS-37 on 24 June 1953, flying the Grumman AF-2S/W Guardian. Between 1954 and 55, they deployed on board the USS Princeton (CV-37) in helping the evacuation of Republic of China (Nationalist China) forces fleeing the Tachen Islands. After this, the squadron made three more deployments that decade with the Grumman S2F-1 and S2F-2 Tracker.

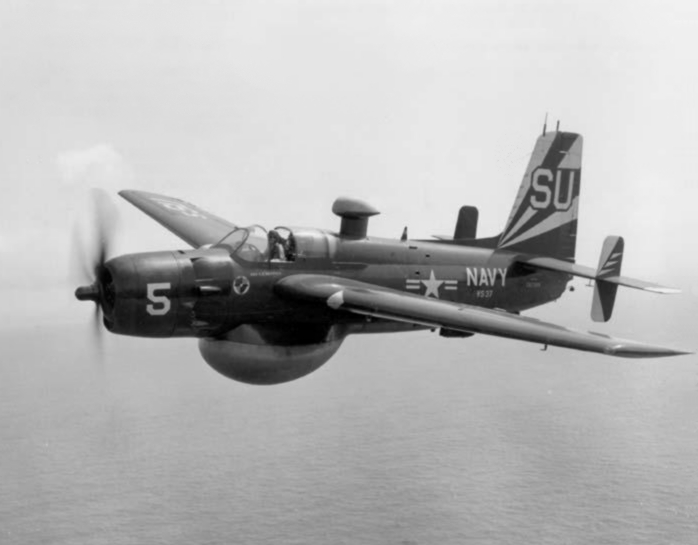
An AF-2W of VS-37 in July 1957.

=== 1960s and 70s ===
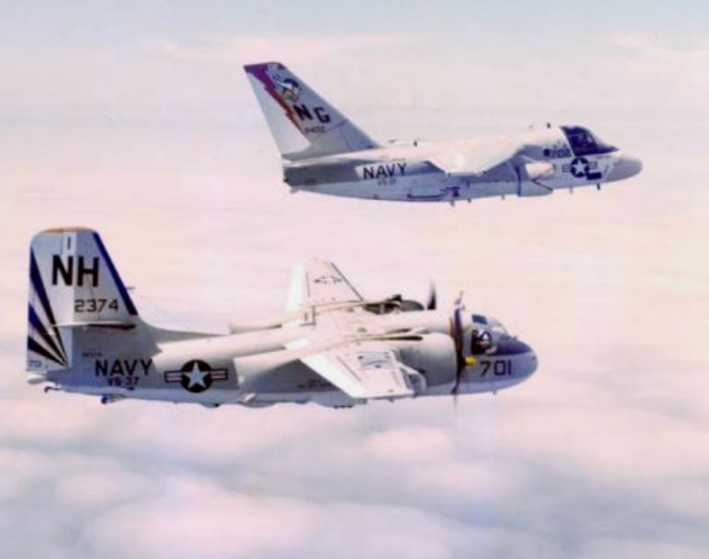
The last S-2G Tracker in VS-37 with an S-3A Viking of VS-21 the red tails.

Starting in 1960, the squadron made its long association with the USS Hornet CVS-12 that would last until 1969. The following year (1961), the squadron split in two with one part remaining VS-37 while the other becoming VS-35. In 1965, '67 and finally in 1969, the squadron deployed with the Hornet to the Vietnam War as well as taking part in the recovery of the test spaceflight Apollo 3 on 25 August 1966. Between October 1970 and February 1971, VS-37 deployed aboard the USS Ticonderoga (CVS-14), travelling to the Indian Ocean once although they did not deploy to Vietnam during that period. After this, the squadron received the US Navy's first S-2G Tracker and moved to CVW-11 on board the USS Kitty Hawk CV-63. During the 1973-1974 deployment CV-63 entered south Vietnam waters where it received a battle pendent from RVN LTGEN KHANG for prior deployment operations, as well as an extended at sea period in the Indian Ocean that included a visit from the Shah of Iran. The final deployment with the S-2G occurred in 1975. In August 1976, the squadron retired the last US Navy Grumman Tracker, replacing it with the Lockheed S-3A Viking. Between September 1978 and May 1979, they deployed with CVW-9 on board the USS Constellation (CV-64) to the Indian Ocean. This included operating the US-3A COD (Carrier Onboard Delivery) aircraft.

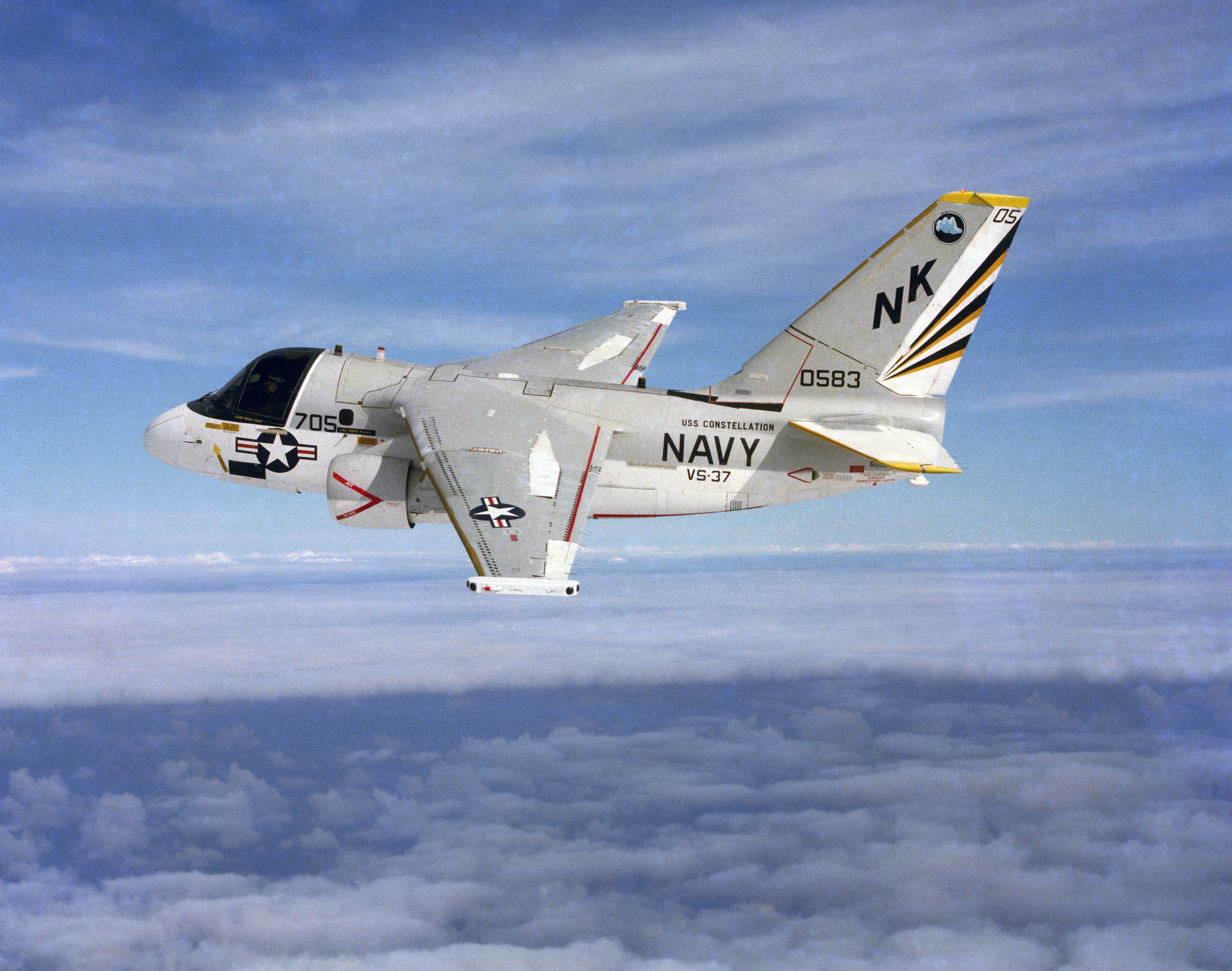
an S-3A Viking of VS-37 assigned to Carrier Air Wing 14 in 1986.

=== 1980s ===
In 1981, they deployed USS Ranger (CV-61) as part of CVW-2 and USS Enterprise (CVN-65) as part of CVW-11 in late 1982 to 1983. Between February 1985 and May 1990, VS-37 deployed with the USS Constellation again with CVW-14 for six deployments in the West and North Pacific as well as the Indian Ocean and Persian Gulf. This included the escorting of US reflagged Kuwaiti tankers in Operation Earnest Will during the Iran-Iraq War in 1987.

=== 1990s (final years) ===
In June 1990, VS-37 deployed with CVW-14 on the USS Independence CV-62. During that deployment, Iraq invaded Kuwait which led to the ship heading to the Persian Gulf as part of Operation Desert Shield. During that time, the squadron helped in enforcing the blockade against Iraq with maritime patrols. On 1 November 1990, the Independence was relieved by the smaller USS Midway CV-41 and her air wing CVW-5 allowing the Independence to return home in December 1990.

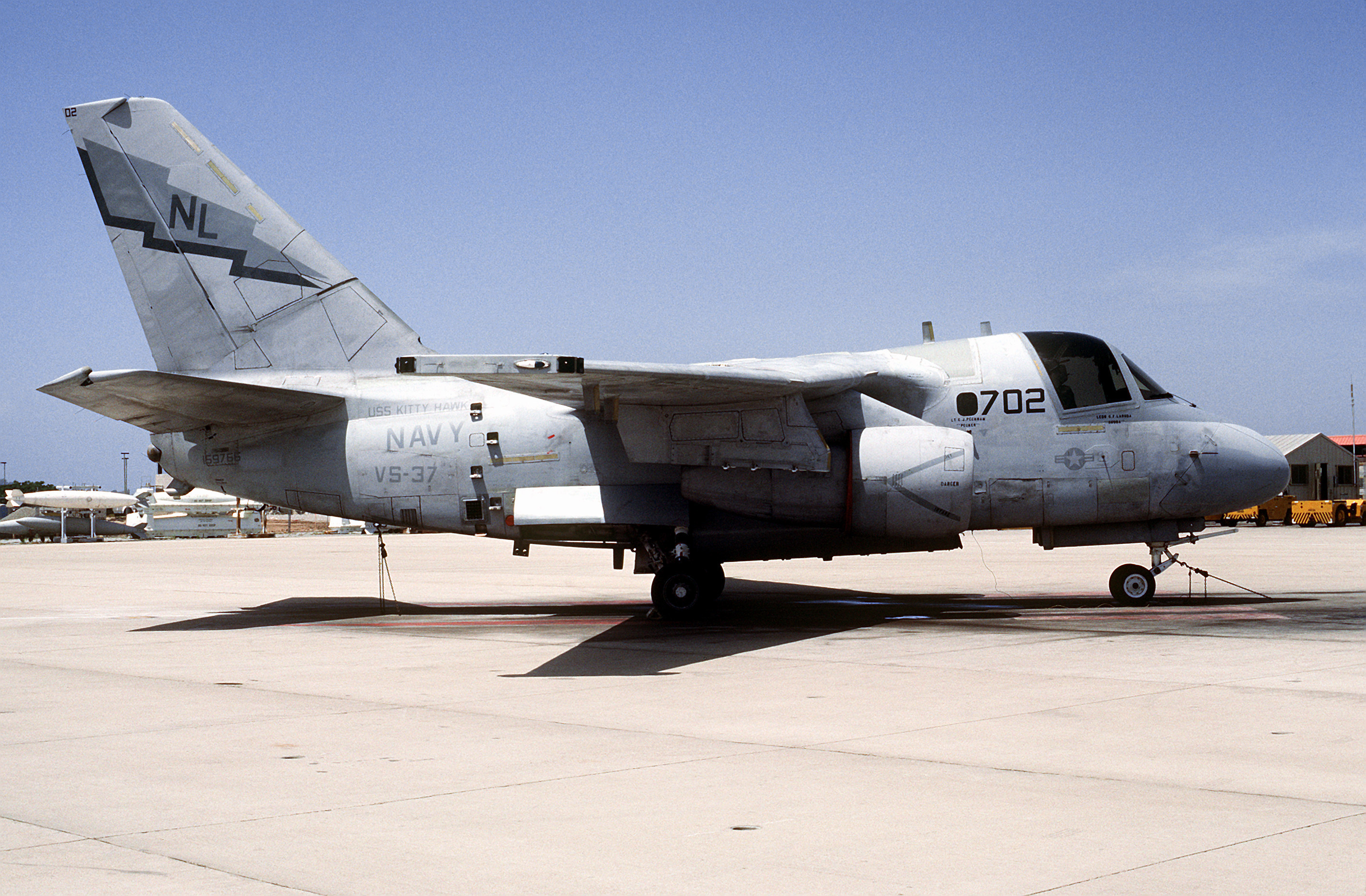
S-3B Viking of VS-37 as part of CVW-15 in 1992 at NAS North Island.

With CVW-15 changing to the Kitty Hawk from the USS Carl Vinson (CVN-70) in 1991, VS-37 moved to back to Kitty Hawk to their new home base of NAS North Island, leaving behind CVW-14 after seven deployments. It was during this time in 1992 that the squadron transitioned to the newer S-3B Viking which had newer systems and capabilities included the ability to fire the AGM-84 Harpoon anti-ship cruise missile.

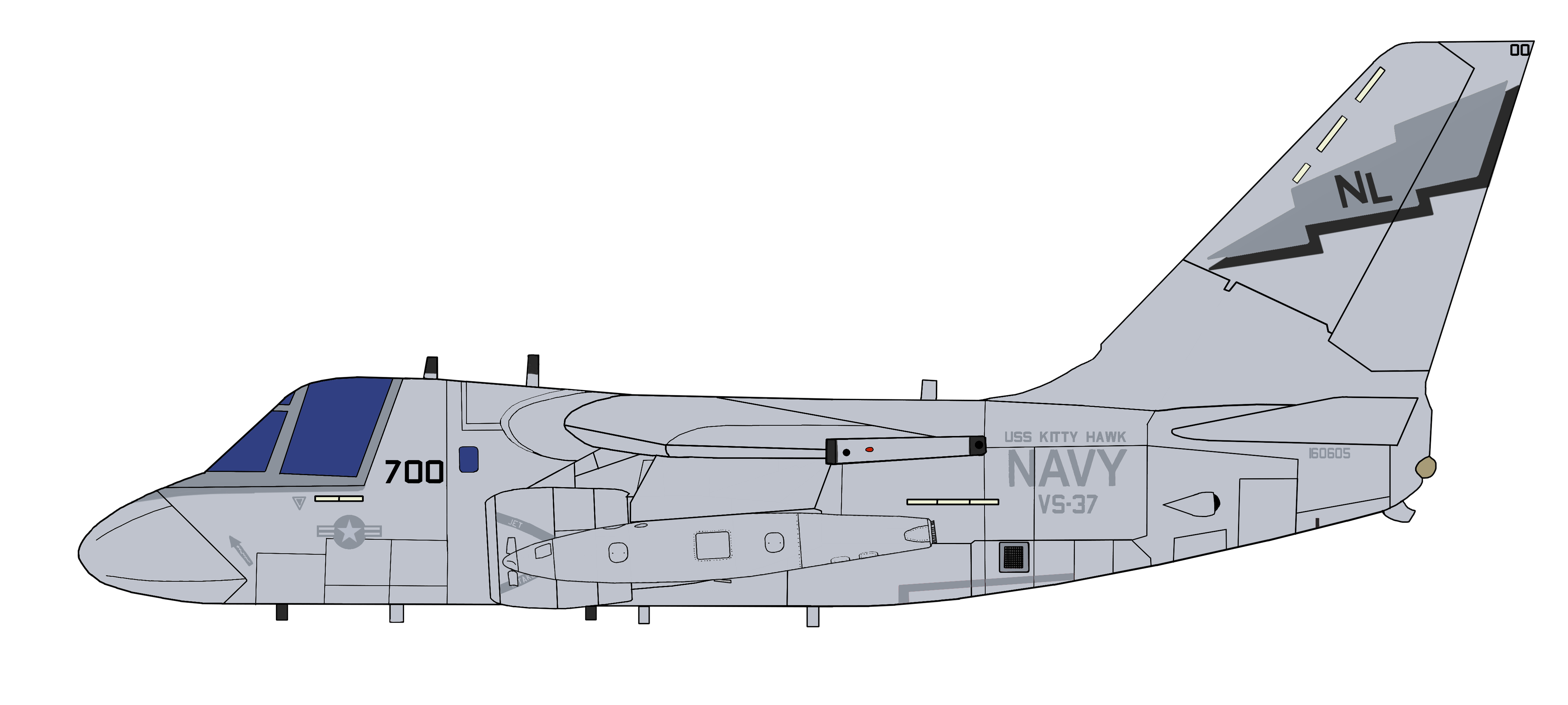
NL700 was not painted as a CAG bird, instead in the squadron standard visibility paint.

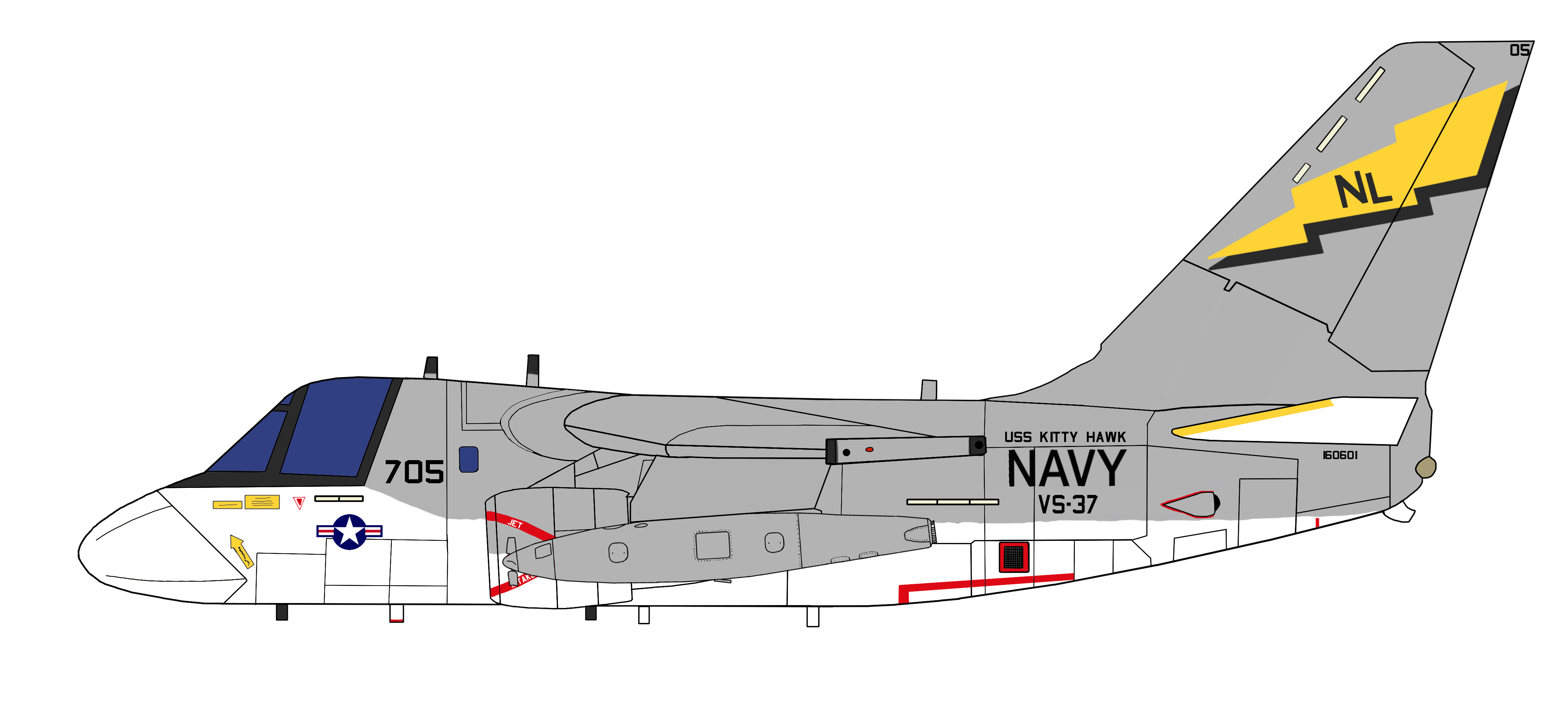
The last visibility painted S-3B Viking of VS-37 reflecting the diversity of paint schemes of the squadron in 1992.

During their last two deployments, they took part in Operation Restore Hope in the war-torn country of Somalia and Operation Southern Watch in Iraq and Kuwait. On 19 January 1993, they supported strikes against Iraq in response to an attack by their anti-aircraft defences.

The following year, they deployed to the Korean peninsula during the 1994 tensions between North and South Korea over the former's Nuclear Program. Among the Vikings that VS-37 deployed was an S-3B 'Outlaw Viking', which was fitted with special Over-the-horizon sensory equipment.

Towards the end of the deployment, their aircraft were involved in a little known incident between the U.S. and P.R.C. On 27 October, several Vikings from the squadron were deployed 450 miles (724 km) northwest of the Kitty Hawk Battlegroup which the latter was west of Kyushu, A PLAN Han class submarine was then detected visually from periscope depth 100 km west of Kyushu shadowing the Kitty Hawk, and was later tracked by their own Vikings, all along the Korean Coast with the aid of sonobuoys and Vikings' magnetic anomaly detector (MAD boom). This also provided considered an opportunity to record the Han class's sonar signature.

The following day the P.R.C. scrambled PLANAF J-6 Farmer aircraft to intercept the Vikings. one of their S-3s soon joined up with the Chinese fighter aircraft which flew around them for around five minutes. The incident then soon ended. During the entire incident, the Han class submarine came as close as 21 miles (around 30 km) towards the Kitty Hawk Battlegroup, much closer than normal battlegroup operating procedures.

At the end of 1994, VS-37 returned from their last ever deployment which was with CVW-15 on the Kitty Hawk. After this on 1 March 1995, VS-37 was disestablished ending 49 years of history. During its last years of service, the squadron had won the COMNAVAIRPAC's 1994 Battle E award, the Golden Wrench for its maintenance record as well as the Admiral Jimmy Thach and Arnold J. Isabel awards for its attributes in ASW. It also won the Top Hook honors as part of CVW-15.

== In fiction ==
VS-37 and CVW-15 were both featured in the novel by Joe Weber, 'Honorable Enemies' as being depicted operating from the Kitty Hawk as what happened in early 90s.

== Aircraft ==
- TBM-3S/W Avenger
- AF-2S/W Guardian
- S2F-1/1S Tracker (S-2A Tracker)
- S2F-2 Tracker (S-2C Tracker)
- S2F-3 Tracker (S-2D Tracker)
- S-2E Tracker
- S-2G Tracker
- S-3A Viking
- S-3B Viking/'Outlaw' Viking
