= Carrier Air Wing Fifteen =

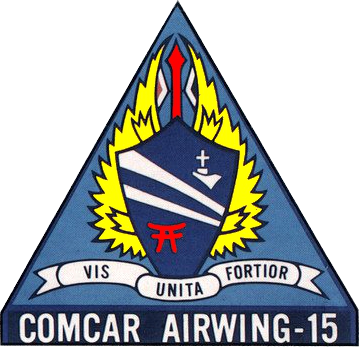
- Active: 20 December 1963 – 31 March 1995 (As CVW-15)
- Country: United States
- Branch: United States Navy
- Type: Carrier air wing
- Engagements: Korean War (as CVG-15); Vietnam War; Cold War; Operation Formation Star; Operation Earnest Will; Operation Restore Hope; January 1993 airstrikes on Iraq; 1994 North Korean nuclear crisis 1994 Yellow Sea incident

Carrier Air Wing Fifteen (CVW-15) is a former United States Navy aircraft carrier air wing that was decommissioned on 31 March 1995. It was previously known as Carrier Air Group Fifteen (CVG-15) before 1963 before being renamed in December of that year.

== History ==
=== Early years and Vietnam War ===
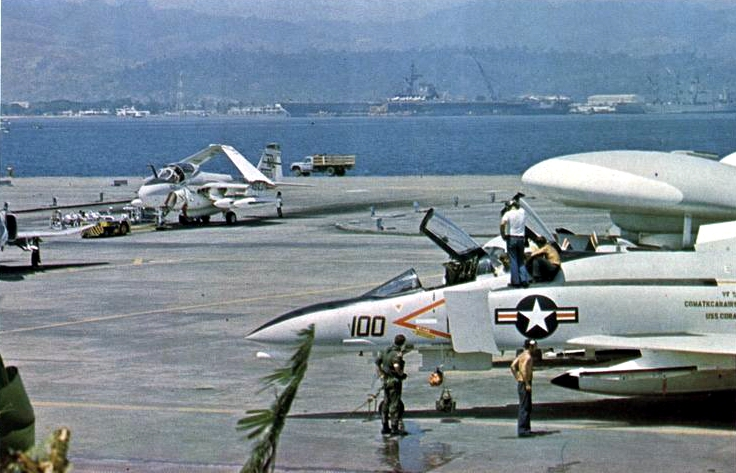
CVW-15 aircraft at NAS Alameda in 1974. USS Coral Sea is in the background.

Carrier Air Group 15 was established on 5 April 1951, and was deployed to the Korean War in September of that year on board the USS Antietam. The squadron was made up of reserve squadrons during the two cruises during the Korean War. Starting in 1960, CVG-15 would begin a two decade long attachment with the USS Coral Sea that would continue when in 1963, all CVGs were re-designated as Carrier Air Wings. With this, CVG-15 became Carrier Air Wing 15. CVW-15 however did deploy with the USS Constellation only once in 1966 during the Vietnam War. During the evacuation of Saigon in 1975, CVW-15's aircraft covered the helicopters used to rescue the civilians fleeing the Invasion.

=== Post Vietnam ===
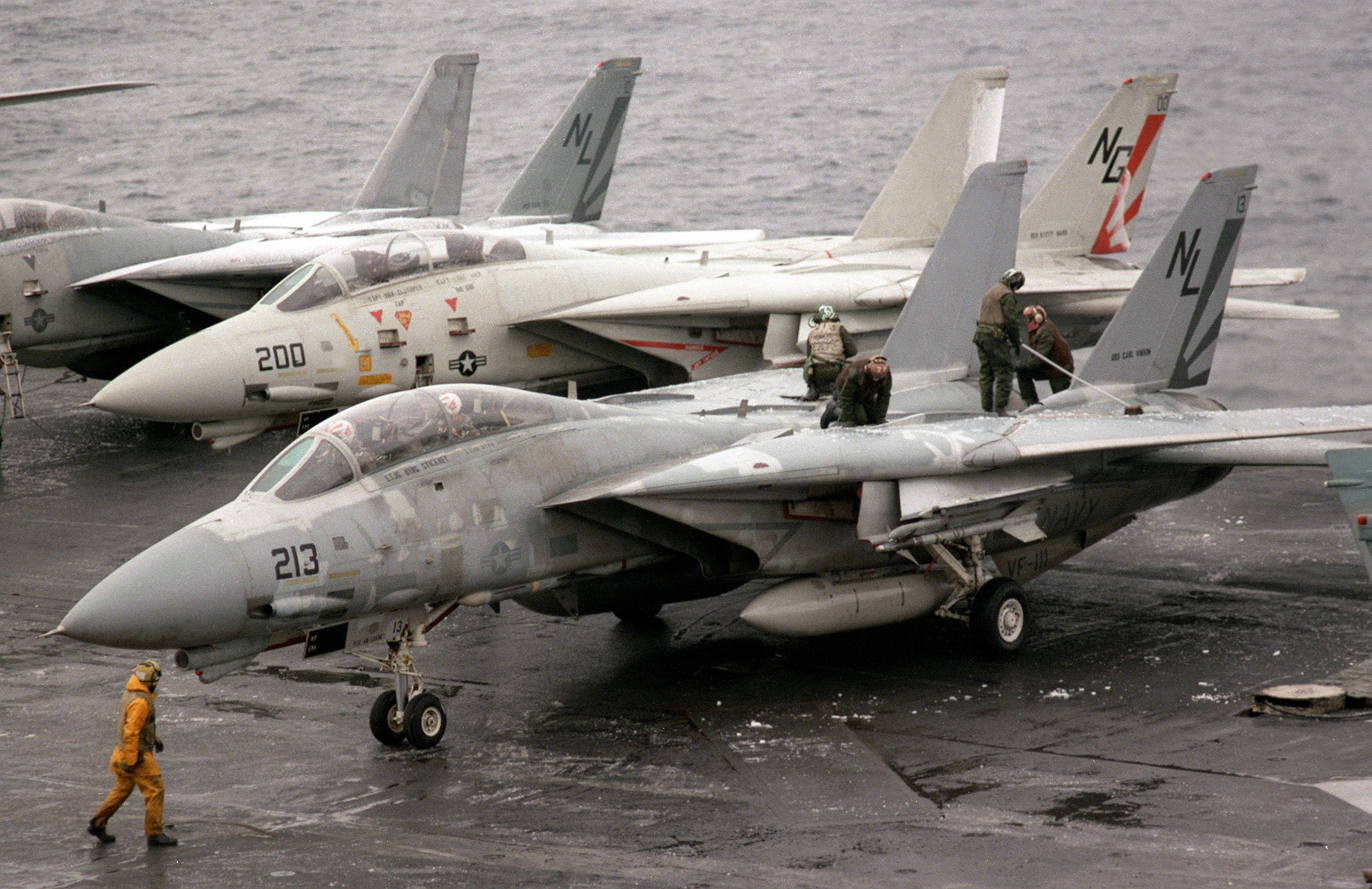
Two F-14A Tomcats of VF-111 during operations aboard the aircraft carrier USS Carl Vinson (CVN-70) in 1987. Note the lighter camouflage of the F-14A with number 200 which wears the tail code "NG" of CVW-9 and the name of CVW-9's (then) parent carrier, USS Kitty Hawk (CV-63). The rudders, however, show the markings of VF-111. The use of false air wing tail codes was an operational deception (OPDEC) measure taken during this CVW-15 deployment to confuse Soviet naval and air forces.

CVW-15 made their final deployment on board the Coral Sea in 1977. This cruise was the only time that the F-4J Phantom and EA-6A Electric Intruder part of CVW-15. After this, in 1979, CVW-15 deployed for the first on a different carrier than Coral Sea in around 13 years when they deployed with USS Kitty Hawk and with new F-14A Tomcat and S-3A Viking.

In 1983, CVW-15 deployed on the new Nimitz-class carrier USS Carl Vinson's first post-shakedown cruise. This cruise was significant as it was an around the world cruise that involved stops in St. Thomas, Monaco, Abidjan, Perth, Subic Bay, British Hong Kong, Sasebo, Pusan, Pearl Harbor and the moving the Vinson's homeport from Norfolk, Virginia on the west coast to Alameda, California, in the San Francisco Bay Area. During their time with the Carl Vinson, they took part in RIMPAC 84' and 86'. During the 1986-to-1987 cruise in the North Pacific, VF-51 and VF-111 carried the multiple tail codes of other carrier air wings to confuse Soviet Naval Aviation patrols which carrier VF-51 and VF-111 were assigned to.

In July 1988, during the Olympics in Seoul, CVW-15 embarked on board Carl Vinson and operated off the coast of South Korea for the ship's fourth overseas deployment. While on station, the carrier supported Operation Earnest Will, the escort of U.S. flagged tankers in the Persian Gulf. The carrier returned to the States on 16 December 1988 and was awarded the Admiral Flatley Memorial Award for aviation safety for 1988. In 1989, they also took part in the large naval exercise PACEX 89.

=== Post–Cold War and Final years ===
In 1990, CVW-15 made their last cruise with the Carl Vinson before moving back to the Kitty Hawk for the rest of their remaining service in the US Navy. This cruise was also the last cruise for the A-7 Corsair in CVW-15 before VA-27 and VA-97 converted to the F/A-18A as well for the SH-3H Sea King which was replaced by the SH-60F Oceanhawk/HH-60H Rescuehawk in the case of HS-4. While on deployment, Kitty Hawk spent nine days off the coast of Somalia supporting U.S. Marines and coalition forces involved in Operation Restore Hope.

On 13 January 1993, VFA-97's CDR. Kevin J. Thomas led a night air strike of 110 coalition aircraft, including 35 aircraft from the Kitty Hawk, against Iraq SAM Command and Control sites in Southern Iraq. This in response to Iraqi violations of U.N. resolutions. On the 18th, an airstrike made of 29 aircraft including F/A-18As and F-14As and E-2Cs in support from CVW-15 was called off when Iraq moved mobile SAM sites into Southern Iraq.

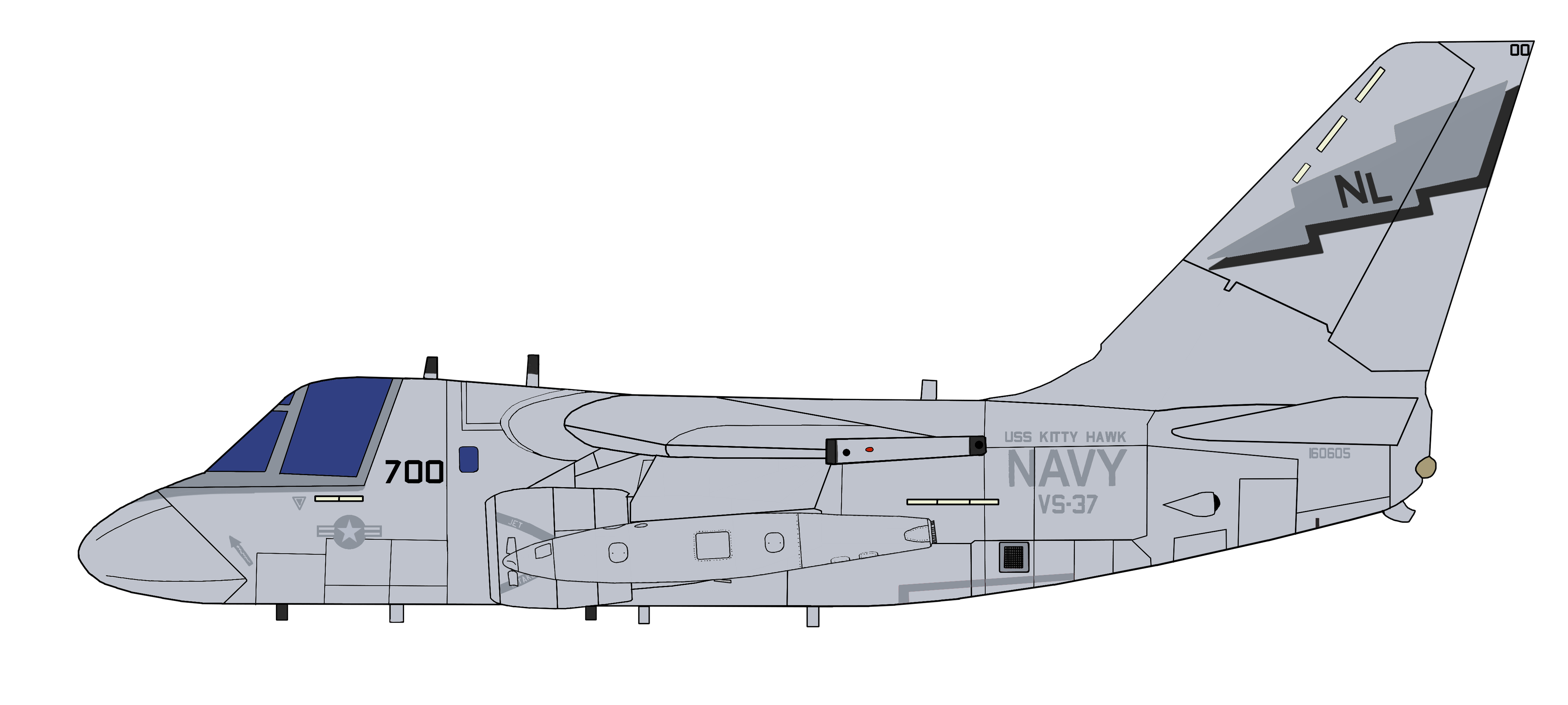
NL700 was not painted as a CAG bird, instead in the squadron standard visibility paint.

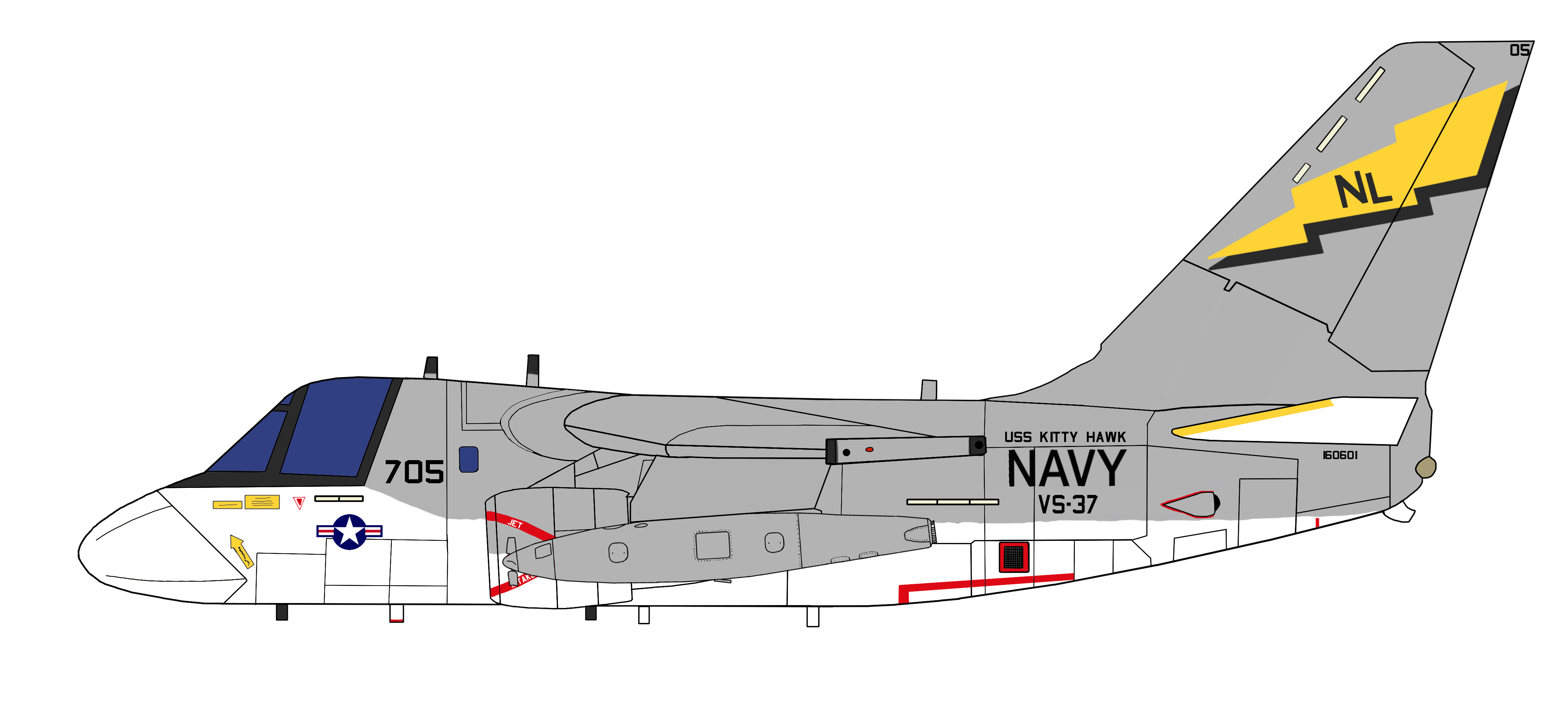
The last visibility painted S-3B Viking of VS-37 reflecting the diversity of paint schemes of the squadron in 1992.

On the 23rd, another incident occurred when Iraqi AAA fired on an A-6E SWIP Intruder from VA-52 and two F/A-18As from CVW-15 over Southern Iraq. In response, the Intruder attacked the AAA site with a 1,000 pound bomb.

Between June and December 1994, CVW-15 made their last deployment before being inactivated in 1995. During that deployment, the air wing participated in the "first anti-submarine warfare prosecution of Chinese Han class sub contact" as well as the tracking of the larger Oscar II Class Submarine between 7 and 8 July, of which were designed to attack American Carrier Battlegroups. The Oscar II Submarine was most likely the K-442 of the Russian Pacific Fleet. The tracking of the Han class Submarine however led to standoff that almost resulted in a fire being exchanged between US and Chinese naval forces.

Carrier Air Wing Fifteen - NL (1994) USS Kitty Hawk CV-63
Cruise Date	Squadrons	Aircraft	Area
24 June 1994 to 22 December 1994	VF-51 Screaming Eagles	F-14A Tomcat	Western Pacific
24 June 1994 to 22 December 1994	VF-111 Sundowners	F-14A Tomcat	Western Pacific
24 June 1994 to 22 December 1994	VFA-97 Warhawks	F/A-18A Hornet	Western Pacific
24 June 1994 to 22 December 1994	VFA-27 Chargers	F/A-18A Hornet	Western Pacific
24 June 1994 to 22 December 1994	VA-52 Knightriders	A-6E SWIP Intruder	Western Pacific
24 June 1994 to 22 December 1994	VAW-114 Hormel Hogs	E-2C Hawkeye	Western Pacific
24 June 1994 to 22 December 1994	HS-4 Blacknights	SH-60F/HH-60H Oceanhawk	Western Pacific
24 June 1994 to 22 December 1994	VAQ-134 Garudas	EA-6B Prowler	Western Pacific
24 June 1994 to 22 December 1994	VS-37 Sawbucks	S-3B Viking	Western Pacific
24 June 1994 to 22 December 1994	VQ-5 Seashadows Detachment C	ES-3A Shadow	Western Pacific
