= 1994 Yellow Sea incident =

1994 maritime incident in yellow sea

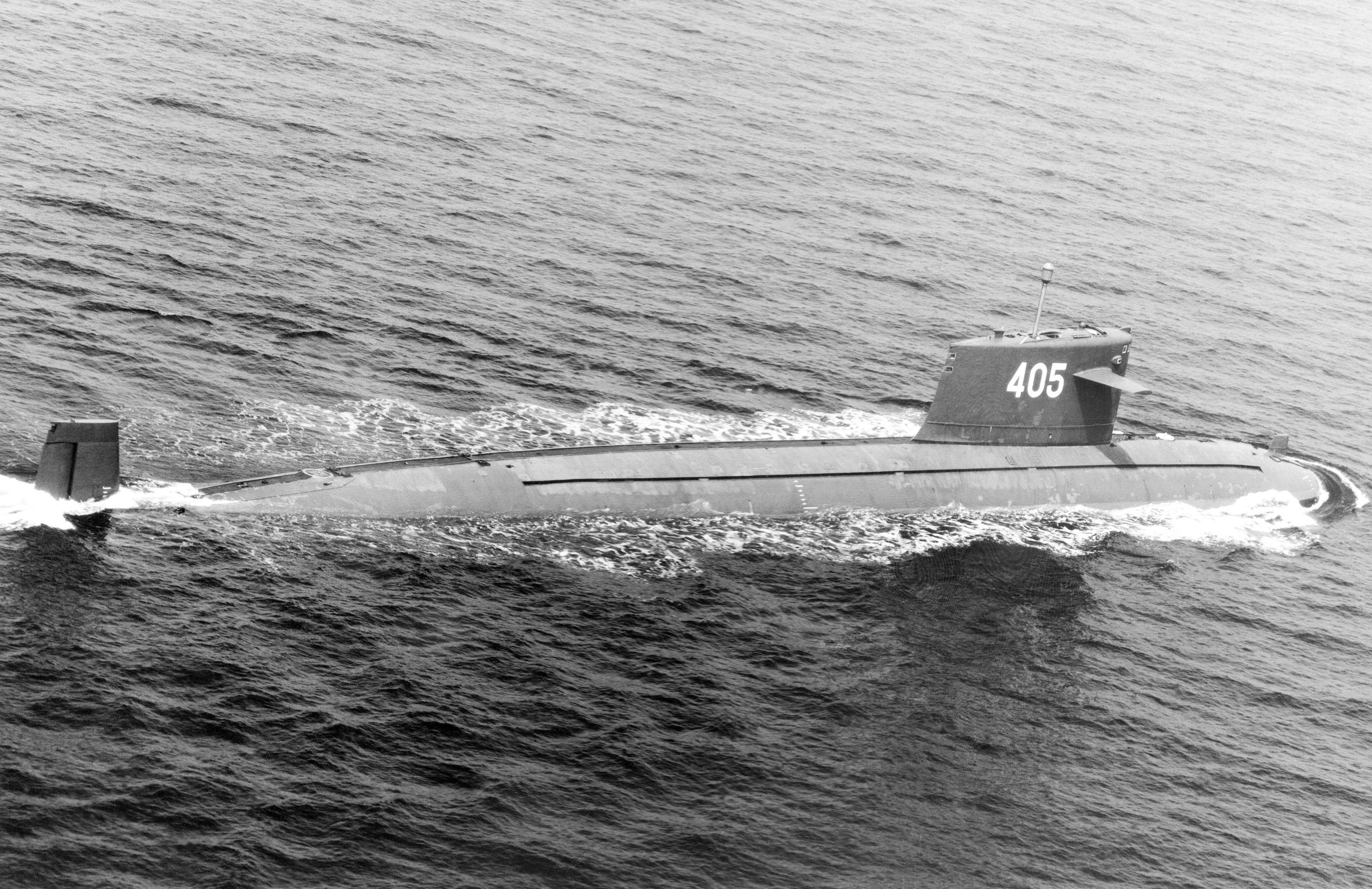
- A Han-class submarine in 1993
Date	27–29 October 1994
Location	Yellow Sea
Result	Incident resolved peacefully; PLAN submarine returns to base

Belligerents
United States	People's Republic of China

Commanders and leaders
(United States) Bill Clinton (United States) Ronald J. Zlatoper	(China) Jiang Zemin (China) Wang Jiying

Units involved
(United States) Kitty Hawk CVBG; (United States) CVW-15; (United States) VS-37	(China) PLAN; (China) PLANAF

Strength
1 Kitty Hawk-class aircraft carrier; 6 S-3B Vikings (VS-37); 2 Ticonderoga-class cruisers; 1 California-class cruiser; 1 Oliver Hazard Perry-class frigate; 1 unnamed USN submarine; 2 unnamed USN supply vessels	1 Han-class (Type 091) submarine; 2-3 J-6 Farmers

The 1994 Yellow Sea incident was a maritime incident that occurred from 27 to 29 October 1994 between the United States Navy's Kitty Hawk carrier battle group and the Chinese Navy (PLAN) in the Yellow Sea. The incident revolved around the tracking of a PLAN Han-class (Type 091) submarine that resulted in a standoff between aircraft from the Kitty Hawk and the PLANAF the following day that almost culminated in a shoot down.

== Incident ==
During the second half of 1994, the aircraft carrier USS Kitty Hawk and her battle group were ordered to stay in the Western Pacific due to tensions in the Korean Peninsula as well as the recent death of North Korean leader Kim Il-Sung on 8 July. During September and October, the carrier battle group spent much of their time conducting operations around the Korean peninsula. A minor encounter in September had occurred between US Navy vessels and another PLAN submarine but was resolved without any major events.

On 27 October 1994, several S-3B Vikings from Kitty Hawk's VS-37 squadron were searching an area that stretched 450 miles (720 km) northeast of the Kitty Hawk when one of them detected a PLAN Han-class (Type 091) submarine at periscope depth, around 62 miles (100 km) west of Kyushu, around 200 miles (320 km) from the battle group, off the coast of the Shandong peninsula. The submarine was shadowing the battle group and initially was able to evade the Vikings, but the use of sonobuoys by the Vikings led to it being reacquired and continuously tracked by the US Navy aircraft. The methods used to track the submarine included sonobuoys and the use of the Vikings' magnetic anomaly detector (MAD) boom in the tail. The tracking of the submarine was considered a unique opportunity for US anti-submarine warfare (ASW) training as well as providing the chance to record high quality tapes of the sonar signature of the Han class.

On 28 October, the Chinese North Sea Fleet Commander (Wang Jiying) scrambled around two to three PLANAF J-6 Farmers to intercept the S-3Bs that were still tracking the submarine. No communication was exchanged between the US and Chinese aircraft as the J-6s flew around the American ASW aircraft. As the Han closed in on the battle group's escort zones, SQS-53 sonars on board the carrier's escorts tracked the submarine. The Han eventually closed to within 19 miles (30 km) to 12 miles (20 km) of the Kitty Hawk battle group, closer than normal operating procedures for a US Navy carrier battle group. The incident concluded around the 29th when the Han resumed its voyage back to its base at the North Sea Fleet HQ in Qingdao.

== Aftermath ==
At a dinner that took place in Beijing after the incident, a US military attaché was warned by a Chinese official that the Kitty Hawk's aircraft had violated China's economic exclusion zone (EEZ) in the Yellow Sea and that future violations would result in force being used. The US, however, did not recognize the EEZ due to its extent near the Korean peninsula and its perceived impediment to freedom of navigation. The United States instead stated that they did not violate Chinese territorial claims as their aircraft were more than 12 miles (19 km) from the Chinese coast.

== See also ==
- 1994 North Korean nuclear crisis, which occurred just before the incident.
- Third Taiwan Strait Crisis
