= 1994 North Korean nuclear crisis =

Diplomatic crisis over nuclear weapons

- Part of Inter-Korean conflict
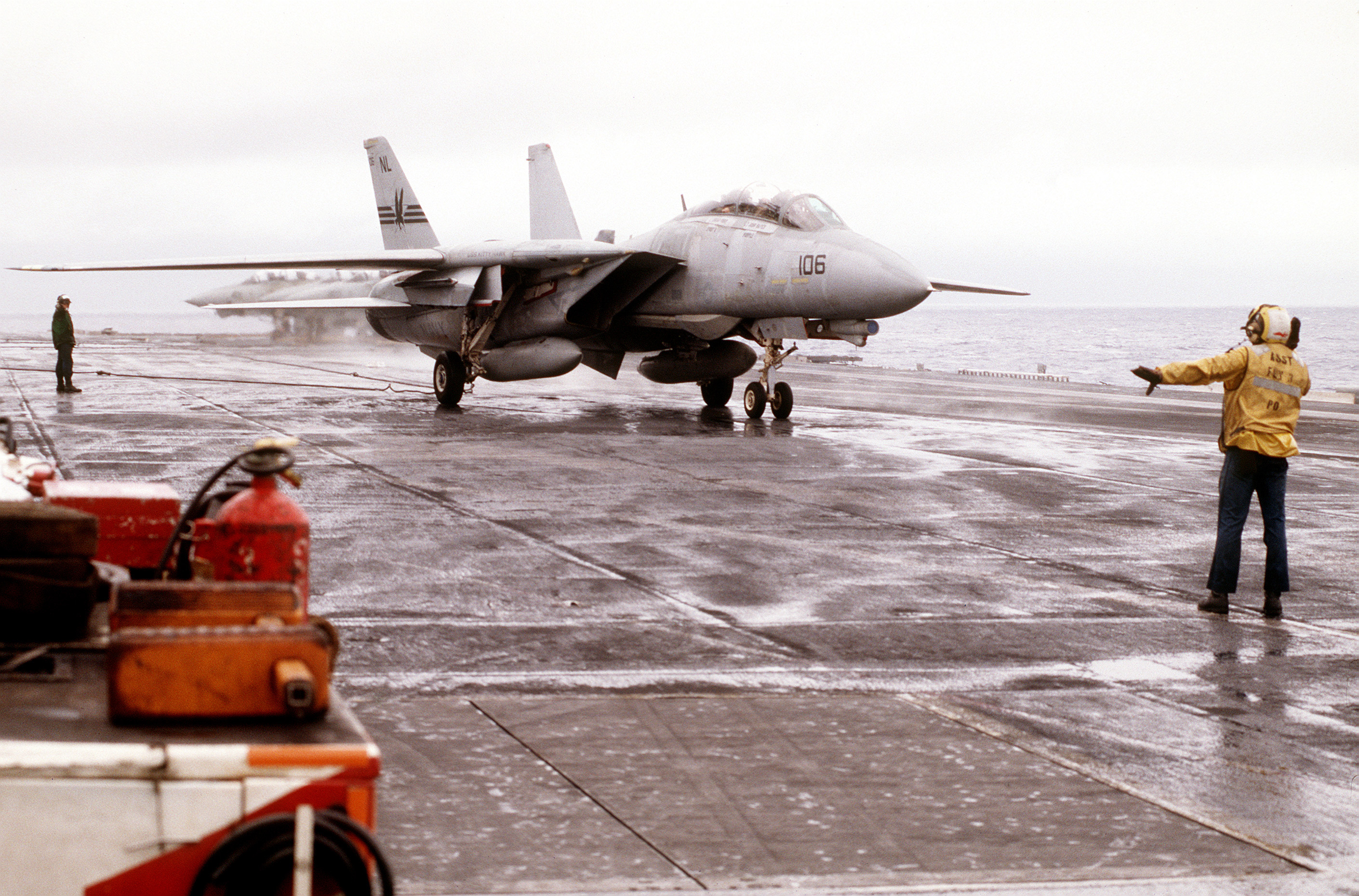
- A US Navy F-14 Tomcat during flight operations aboard the USS Kitty Hawk on 4 December 1994
| Date | 12 March 1993 – 21 October 1994 (1 year, 7 months, 1 week and 2 days) |
| Location | Korean Peninsula; Sea of Japan |
| Result | Agreed Framework signed between United States and North Korea; Temporary suspension of North Korean nuclear weapons program; Cessation of Team Spirit exercises |

Belligerents
| North Korea | United States; South Korea |

Commanders and leaders
| (North Korea) Kim Il Sung (before 8 July 1994) (North Korea) Kim Jong Il (after 8 July 1994) | (United States) Bill Clinton (South Korea) Kim Yong-sam |

Strength
| (North Korea) Korean People's Army | United States Forces Korea and Japan; (United States) US Army Pacific; (United States) USAF PACAF; (United States) US 7th Fleet; (United States) USS Kitty Hawk carrier group; (United States) CVW-15; (United States) USS Independence carrier group; (United States) CVW-5; (South Korea) ROK Armed Forces |

The 1994 North Korean nuclear crisis was a crisis on the Korean Peninsula, mainly revolving around North Korea's nuclear program. Largely caused by North Korea's announcement that it would withdraw from the Nuclear Non-Proliferation Treaty (NPT) in 1993, the tensions could have led to a war between North Korea and the US, had it not been for an agreement reached between former US President Jimmy Carter and then-North Korean Leader Kim Il Sung. It led to North Korea and the United States signing the Agreed Framework in October 1994, effectively ending the crisis.

== Background ==
North Korea's involvement in the NPT dates back to December 1985, when it signed the treaty, around the same it built its first reactor. At the end of the Cold War in 1991, the United States removed all of its nuclear weapons that were based abroad including the last 100 or so of their tactical nuclear weapons from South Korea. Although initially criticizing the US, North Korea's response to this withdrawal changed when on November 26, North Korea stated it would allow US inspectors into its nuclear facilities if all nuclear weapons were removed. Although IAEA inspectors were allowed to inspect some of these facilities, many were still closed off as North Korea claimed that they had military secrets, leading to suspicion that they were for a nuclear weapons program. 1992 also saw the US and South Korea cancel the Team Spirit '92 joint exercises, although Team Spirit '93 would be held in February 1993.

== Main tensions ==
=== 1993 ===
After months of disagreements over the 1991 inspection agreements, Pyongyang announced on 12 March 1993 that they planned to pull out from the NPT. In response to this, Russia carried out minor economic sanctions against North Korea that it had threatened as early as 1991. Pyongyang reversed its decision after a meeting with US diplomats in New York City and agreed to follow IAEA safeguards and allow inspections at seven declared nuclear sites in the country. Relations between North Korea and the IAEA deteriorated in September and US and the IAEA issued a warning to North Korea. After pressing for dialogue to resume, in December the US demanded that the seven nuclear sites in North Korea be opened to inspectors.

=== 1994 ===
After promising inspections the previous year, beginning on 3 March 1994, IAEA inspectors were allowed for two weeks to inspect most of North Korea's nuclear facilities. However, they were prevented from inspecting its main radiochemical facility, used for fuel reprocessing. On 17 March, The New York Times reported that the US had cancelled talks with the North and that Team Spirit '94 would be conducted. This was followed by the announcement of a shipment of Patriot missiles to South Korea on the 23rd. The 2nd Battalion, 7th Air Defense Artillery would later be replaced by a more permanent Patriot missile unit in the form of the 1st Battalion, 43rd Air Defense Artillery Regiment in October 1994.

In June, the US considered using Operation Plan 5027 (OPLAN 5027), the war plan that was to be used in case of a North Korean attack. This was due to the fear that the North would view the recent buildup of US troops as well as evacuations as a sign of an attack and thus invade the South. Park Yong Su, a North Korean negotiator, threatened to turned Seoul into a "sea of flames". The Pentagon however wanted to use the 'Middle Option' of moving around 10,000 more troops, several F-117As and a carrier battle group to the region. There were also plans to take out the Nyongbyon Nuclear Scientific Research Center with the F-117s as well as cruise missiles, to prevent North Korea from creating nuclear devices. This plan was however called off when former US President Jimmy Carter met with North Korean leader Kim Il Sung and the two agreed to the basis of what would be the Agreed Framework.

However, on 8 July, Kim Il Sung died from a heart attack he suffered the previous day. Due to this as well as the recent instability in the Peninsula, the USS Kitty Hawk, CVW-15 and their battlegroup were diverted from their deployment to the Persian Gulf and to the Western Pacific. The USS Independence (which was based in Yokosuka, Japan) also conducted operations near the Korean Peninsula. Kim Yong-sam would later claim in 2009 that there were "33 destroyers and two aircraft carriers" of the US Navy in the Sea of Japan waiting to strike North Korea. He also claimed to have opposed strikes on North Korea because of their consequences. The US and South Korea however also offered to cancel Team Spirit '94 as an incentive for North Korea to open dialogue with them. Team Spirit '93 would in fact be the last Team Spirit exercise ever held.

== Aftermath ==
On 21 October 1994, the Agreed Framework was signed in Geneva, apparently freezing North Korea's nuclear program. Despite this, almost a decade later, owing in part to tensions between the US and North Korea over the latter's missile transfers to Iran, North Korea would resume its nuclear weapons program. Shortly after the Agreed Framework deal was signed, the Kitty Hawk and her battle group were involved in a tense standoff with Chinese naval forces from 27-29 October 1994 that was resolved peacefully.

== See also ==
- 1994 FIFA World Cup
- 2017-18 North Korea crisis
