= Carrier Strike Group 7 =

Carrier Strike Group Seven
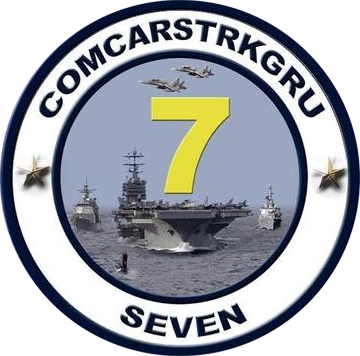
- Carrier Strike Group Seven crest.
- Active: 1 October 2004 to 30 December 2011
- Country: United States
- Branch: United States Navy
- Role: Naval air/surface warfare
- Part of: U.S. Third Fleet
- Garrison/HQ: Naval Air Station North Island, California
- Engagements: Operation Frequent Wind; Operation Southern Watch; 1996 Taiwan Strait Crisis; Operation Anaconda; Iraq War (2003–2011); War in Afghanistan (2001–2021)
- Website: Official website

Carrier Strike Group Seven (CSG-7 or CARSTRKGRU 7) was a U.S. Navy carrier strike group active from October 2004 until 30 December 2011. The strike group's antecedents included two previous aircraft carrier formations, Carrier Division Seven and Carrier Group Seven. Its heritage thus includes the Second World War, the Vietnam War, and the Cold War, as well as the first and the second Persian Gulf wars, encompassing a total of 34 deployments to the Western Pacific Ocean and Persian Gulf.

== Historical sketch 1944–2004 ==
Carrier Strike Group Seven traced its lineage back to Night Carrier Division Seven, the U.S. Navy's first and only aircraft carrier formation exclusively dedicated to night air operations. Established on 19 December 1944, its aircraft carriers provided night air combat patrols for the U.S. Pacific Fleet's Fast Carrier Task Force during World War Two. Night Carrier Division Seven participated in the Philippine and Okinawa campaigns as well as carrier air raids against the Japanese home islands. According to Clark G. Reynolds' The Fast Carrier and Edward P Stafford's Big E, the Enterprise and Saratoga operated very briefly off Okinawa in February 1945 until Saratoga was detached to cover the escort carrier and amphibious force. Initially, Night Carrier Division Seven operated as a separate carrier task group within Task Force 38 and operated only at night. When USS Bonhomme Richard (CV-31) arrived, it was integrated into an existing task group, and the commander of Night Carrier Division Seven directed the night operations within that task group.

Carrier Division Seven was re-established at Naval Air Station Alameda, California, on 22 March 1956. The group commander and staff first deployed to the Western Pacific on board USS Bon Homme Richard (CVA-31) in 1957. USS Coral Sea, fresh from refit, arrived at Alameda on 1 April 1960 and was assigned to Carrier Division Seven. During the Vietnam War, division aircraft carriers operated as part of Task Force 77 from Yankee Station and Dixie Station. During its third Vietnam combat deployment, the Coral Sea implemented a new anti-MiG combat patrol plan developed by the Carrier Division Seven staff. Other aircraft carriers assigned to the division included Ticonderoga, Lexington, Hancock, Kearsarge, Oriskany, and Shangri-La. On 13 September 1962, Rear Admiral Ralph L. Shifley, Commander, Carrier Division Seven, embarked aboard USS Kitty Hawk (CV-63) for her first Pacific deployment. In January 1963, the division conducted the major Pacific Fleet exercise 'Red Wheel.'

On 6 April 1964, Rear Admiral William F. Bringle assumed command of Carrier Division Seven. In addition to commanding Carrier Division Seven, Admiral Bringle served as Commander Task Group 77.6, during the period of 29 March, to 29 June 1965 and as Commander Task Force 77 from 28 May, to 27 June 1965.

Carrier Division Seven was re-designated as Carrier Group Seven on 30 June 1973. USS Enterprise (CVN-65) reached Cubi Point in the Philippines in time for Christmas Eve 1974. An extended deployment in the Indian Ocean lay ahead. "On the morning of 5 February 1975, Enterprise anchored four miles outside of Mombasa, while guided missile destroyer USS Benjamin Stoddert (DDG-22) and ocean escort USS Rathburne (DE-1057) moored to buoys.. Two days later, Rear Admiral William L. Harris, Jr., relieved Rear Admiral Owen H. Oberg, as Commander, Carrier Group Seven." After Cyclone Gervais struck Mauritius on 6 February 1975, Enterprise, USS Long Beach (CGN-9), and USS Camden (AOE-2) were sent to provide disaster relief. In the last days of April 1975 the Enterprise and USS Coral Sea attack carrier groups stood off South Vietnam covering Operation Frequent Wind, the final evacuation of Americans and associated Vietnamese from the doomed country. In 1978, the group was homeported at Alameda as part of Commander, Naval Air Forces, Pacific Fleet (COMNAVAIRPAC). By 1984, as always part of COMNAVAIRPAC, the staff had moved to NAS North Island and controlled USS Ranger (CV-61).

On 2 July 1985, a group change of command ceremony was held on Kitty Hawk's flight deck, and Read Admiral Stan Arthur hauled down his flag. Rear Admiral D. M. Brooks then took command of the group, with his flag in Kitty Hawk. On 24 July 1985, Kitty Hawk, with Rear Admiral Brooks, Commander Destroyer Squadron 13, and Carrier Air Wing 9 embarked, departed San Diego to commence its fifteenth Western Pacific deployment. Kitty Hawk spent two days in the Southern California Operating Area on 25–26 July to conduct an abbreviated Operational Readiness Exercise which included AAW defense, long-range conventional strikes and a 39-hour ASW exercise. The group commenced TRANSITEX 85–14 en route to Naval Station Subic Bay in the Philippines on 27 July. Kitty Hawk conducted Exercise Busy Observer, with USAF B-52s simulating Soviet Tupolev Tu-95 Bear D aircraft on 29 July. An encounter exercise was held with the USS New Jersey Surface Action Group on 1 August and then Carrier Air Wing Nine participated in COPE CANINE 85-02, a Hawaiian air defence exercise, on 2–3 August. USS Pintado then practiced anti-submarine warfare with the group on 3–4 August.

On 9–10 August an ENCOUNTEREX/INCHOPEX was held with USS Constellation (CV-64) (Battle Group Delta) as they returned from a Western Pacific deployment. On each of these days, Kitty Hawk was monitored by a pair of Soviet Tu-95 aircraft. Kitty Hawk came under the operational control of the U.S. Seventh Fleet on 12 August and transited the Bashi Channel five days later. The ship the operated briefly in the South China Sea.

During 1986, Kitty Hawk was under the group's control from January to 28 June 1986, and then was transferred to Cruiser-Destroyer Group 5 for later work ups, which included READIEX 87–1. In 1987, the group controlled Kitty Hawk, which was in the process of shifting to the Atlantic Fleet, and USS Constellation (CV-64). In 1990–91, the group saw action during the First Gulf War. Rear Admiral R.J. Zlatoper commanded the group from the carrier Ranger. Later, the group made several Middle East deployments, taking part in Operation Southern Watch.

Carrier Air Wing 9, 1993
VF-211 (F-14A)
VF-24 (F-14A)
VFA-146 (F/A-18C (N))
VFA-147 (F/A-18C (N))
VA-165 (A-6E SWIP/KA-6D)
VAW-112 (E-2C)
HS-2 (SH-60F/HH-60H)
VAQ-138 (EA-6B)
VS-33 (S-3B)

Rear Admiral Thomas A. Mercer commanded the group (aboard Ranger, Midway, and Nimitz) before becoming Commander, Naval Forces Philippines. From the summer of 1992, the guided-missile cruisers Long Beach, Halsey, Reeves, Fox, and Truxtun; Destroyer Squadron 23; Carrier Air Wing Nine; and the carrier Nimitz were assigned as permanent units of the group. However the group did not deploy again until 1993.

Carrier Group Seven, led by Rear Admiral Lyle Bien aboard Nimitz, crossed the Pacific Ocean from 2 to 20 December 1995 headed for Hong Kong. Early the next year, as part of the U.S. response to the developing Third Taiwan Straits Crisis, the group transited at high speed from the Persian Gulf to the South China Sea. As of 11 March 1996 Nimitz was taking part in Operation Southern Watch in the Gulf, but a week later the carrier was in the Indian Ocean, en route to South China Sea. Accompanying Nimitz were USS Port Royal (CG-73), USS Callaghan (DD 994), USS Oldendorf (DD 972), USS Ford (FFG-54), USS Willamette (AO 180), USS Shasta (AE 33) and USS Portsmouth (SSN-707). Aircraft from Carrier Air Wing 9 were embarked aboard Nimitz. Nimitz and six additional ships arrived near Taiwan before 23 March 1996 presidential election. The Nimitz battle group received a Meritorious Unit Commendation for these operations, formally for the period 13 December 1995 to 3 May 1996. Later in 1996, Rear Admiral John B. Nathman commanded Carrier Group Seven, the Nimitz Carrier Strike Group and Battle Force FIFTY in the Persian Gulf.

On 26 February 1998, Carrier Group Seven departed Naval Station Norfolk, the commander and staff embarked aboard USS John C. Stennis (CVN-74), which was making her maiden deployment. The group consisted of the carrier Stennis; Carrier Air Wing Seven; the cruiser San Jacinto; the destroyers Laboon and Cole; the destroyer Caron; the attack submarines Minneapolis-St. Paul and Providence; and the fast combat support ship Bridge.

On 12 November 2001, two months ahead of schedule, the group left for an accelerated Middle East deployment, and became involved in the War in Afghanistan. The carrier strike group consisted of the carrier John C. Stennis; Carrier Air Wing Nine; the cruisers Lake Champlain and Port Royal; destroyers Decatur and Elliot; the guided-missile frigate Jarrett; the submarines Salt Lake City and Jefferson City; and the fast combat support ship Bridge. The group later saw action in Operation Anaconda and the Second Gulf War.

From June 2002 to January 2003, Stennis underwent a seven-month refit. On 15 November 2003, Rear Admiral Matt Moffit turned over command of the group to Rear Admiral Patrick M. Walsh. On 21 November 2003, the group completed a 26-day Composite Training Unit Exercise.

Since 1956, aircraft carriers assigned to the group and division not already mentioned have included Midway, Coral Sea, Kitty Hawk, Saratoga, Constellation, Enterprise, and America.

== 2004–2006 operations ==
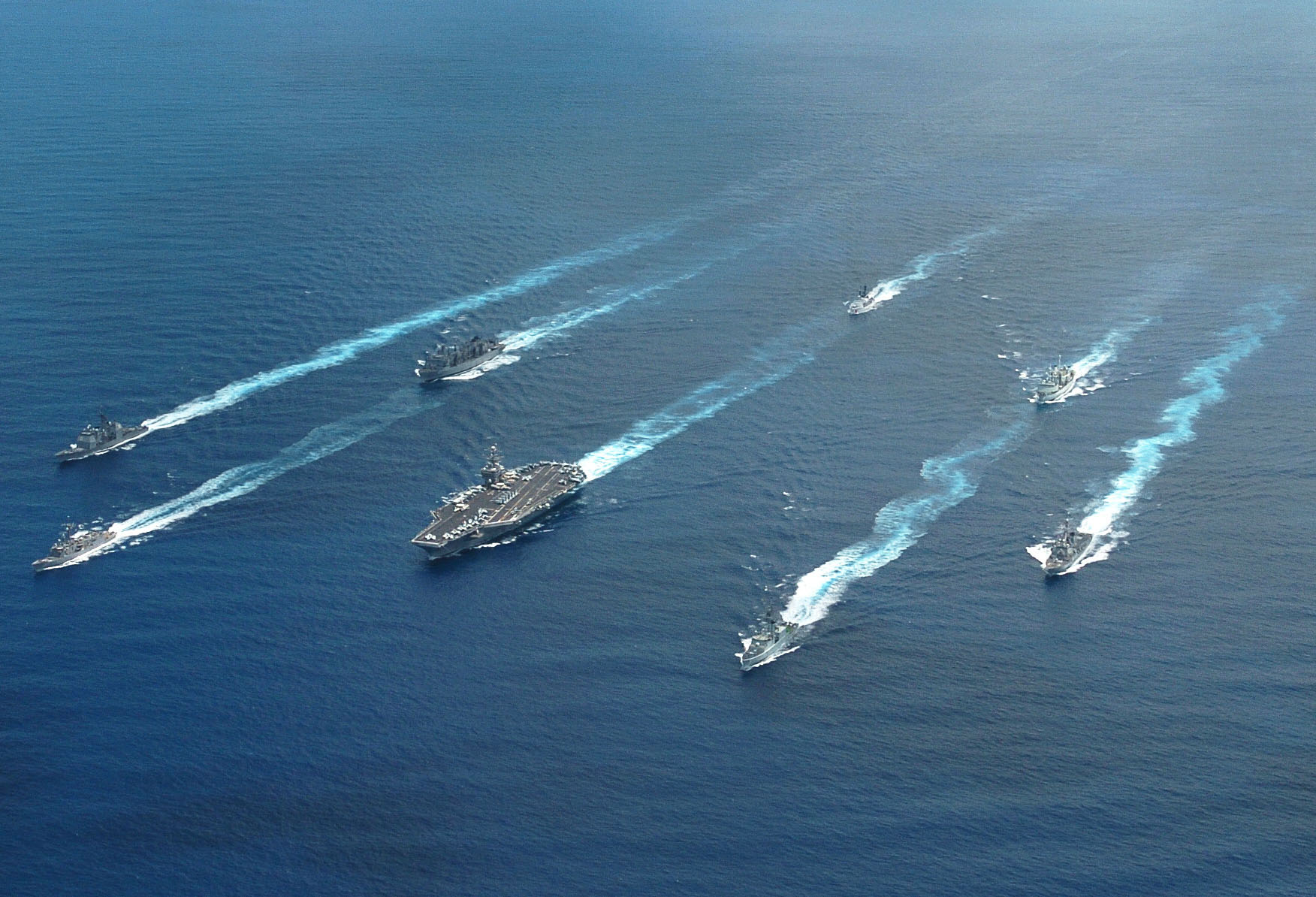
Stennis Battle Group at RIMPAC 2004

In May 2004, the battle group deployed for the Western Pacific. During the deployment, the group consisted of the cruiser Lake Champlain, the replenishment ship Rainier, the frigate Ford, the destroyer Howard, and the submarine Salt Lake City. During the deployment, the group took part in exercises Northern Edge 2004, JASEX 2004, and RIMPAC 2004. Also in 2004 the group provided humanitarian relief after the 2004 Indian Ocean earthquake.

Carrier Group Seven was re-designated as Carrier Strike Group Seven on 1 October 2004. Rear Admiral Michael H. Miller took command of the group on 15 April 2005. The aircraft carrier Ronald Reagan became the new group flagship in 2005 after the John C. Stennis changed its homeport.

On 17 October 2005, the group departed Naval Base San Diego, California to begin its pre-deployment Composite Training Unit Exercise. The exercise was designed to train the whole carrier strike group to function as one, and consisted of two distinct phases evaluated by Commander, Strike Force Training Pacific. In addition to Carrier Strike Group Seven, several Canadian Navy ships also participated in the exercise, including the destroyer Algonquin; the frigates Vancouver, Calgary, and Ottawa; and the replenishment tanker Protecteur. On 6 December 2005, the group departed San Diego for its final predeployment exercise, Joint Task Force Exercise 06-2 (JTFEX 06-2) off the coast of southern California. The exercise was completed on 17 December 2005. During this exercise, later reports indicate the leased Swedish AIP attack submarine HSwMS Gotland managed to penetrate the defences of the group and 'sink' the Ronald Reagan.

The group deployed to the Middle East on 4 January 2006. Escorts for the deployment included Lake Champlain, McCampbell, Paul Hamilton, and Decatur, accompanied by Rainier. Also part of the group for the deployment was United States Navy EOD Unit 11, Det. 15. Carrier Air Wing Fourteen included strike fighter squadrons VFA-22, VFA-25, VFA-113, VFA-115, tactical electronic warfare squadron VAQ-139, airborne early warning squadron VAW-113, helicopter squadron HS-4, and a detachment from logistics unit VRC-30. Off Hawaii, the group completed a four-day anti-submarine warfare exercise on 12 January 2006. During the exercise, an improved sonar system installed in both participating destroyers was used for the first time. The group entered the U.S. Fifth Fleet area on 18 February 2006, and fleet commander Vice Admiral Patrick M. Walsh visited Reagan on 27 February 2006. Carrier Strike Group Seven completed operations with the Fifth Fleet on 29 May 2006. During the deployment, Carrier Air Wing Fourteen flew about 2940 sorties over Iraq and Afghanistan. The group then participated in Valiant Shield 2006, a major U.S. Pacific Command joint exercise. Valiant Shield, held near Guam from 19–23 June 2006, involved three carrier strike groups: Carrier Strike Group Five, Carrier Strike Group Seven, and Carrier Strike Group Nine.

On 9 November 2006, Carrier Strike Group Seven departed San Diego to sustain multi-ship warfare skills through carrying out Joint Task Force Exercise 07-1 (JTFEX 07-1). During the exercise, between 12–16 November 2006, Carrier Strike Group Seven combined with Carrier Strike Group Three, to form Carrier Task Force 150 under the overall command of Rear Admiral Kevin Quinn, Commander, Carrier Strike Group Three. This was the first time the two groups had operated together. JTFEX 07-1 was not a normal pre-deployment exercise; it aimed to sustain multi-ship warfighting skills in the event either strike group had to make an unexpected deployment. To maintain all the skills necessary to fight the entire two-carrier group together, the exercise tested individual ships (in general quarters and usage of weapons), the two carrier air wings, and the ships and aircraft of the strike group(s) fighting as a team. With the two carrier air wings operating together, the normal 12-hour cycle of flight operations could be doubled to a continuous 24-hour cycle.

Surface warships operating with CTF-150 practiced the full spectrum of surface warfare scenarios. Led by the commodore of Destroyer Squadron 21 (DESRON-21) acting as CTF-150s Sea Combat Commander (SCC), the surface warships conducted sustained operations in maritime interdiction operations (MIO), anti-submarine warfare (ASW), anti-surface warfare (ASUW), and mine warfare (MW). ASW continued to be the top war-fighting priority.

== 2007–2009 operations ==
On 25 January 2007 Rear Admiral Charles W. Martoglio relieved Rear Admiral Miller, and commanded the group until 16 November 2007, when he was relieved himself by Rear Admiral James P. Wisecup. Following Wisecup, Rear Admiral Scott P. Hebner held command from 27 October 2008 to 27 October 2009.

On 27 January 2007, the group departed from San Diego for its Western Pacific surge deployment. The group operated in the western Pacific while Carrier Strike Group Five's flagship, USS Kitty Hawk (CV-63), began maintenance in Yokosuka, Japan. Between 16–18 March 2007, the group took part in a passing exercise with the Japanese Maritime Self Defense Force in the Philippine Sea. Ronald Reagan also conducted a fueling at sea with each of the four JMSDF ships. On 25 March 2007, the group began its involvement in Exercise RSOI/Foal Eagle 2007, a seven-day combined/joint exercise conducted annually involving forces from both the United States and the Republic of Korea. On 7 April 2007, Reagan concluded its three-day munitions offload to the Military Sealift Command ammunition ship Flint, signifying the end of its Seventh Fleet deployment. The group returned to North Island on 20 April 2007. Amongst the escorts for the deployment were USS Lake Champlain (CG-57), USS Paul Hamilton (DDG-60), and USS Russell (DDG-59).

Following the group's return in April 2007, Ronald Reagan entered a six-month, $150-million refit. On 31 October 2007, Ronald Reagan returned to North Island, following two days of sea trials to evaluate its material readiness to rejoin the fleet. On 9 November 2007, Reagan returned to Naval Air Station North Island, California, after completing its flight deck certification.

On 16 November 2007, Rear Admiral James P. Wisecup relieved Rear Admiral Charles W. Martoglio as group commander. On 27 November 2007, the Ronald Reagan left San Diego to carry out their Tailored Ship's Training Assessment, designed to prepare the ship and embarked air wing for combat operations. Joining the Reagan and CVW-14 were the guided-missile cruiser Chancellorsville; the guided-missile destroyers Gridley and Howard; and the guided-missile frigate Thach.

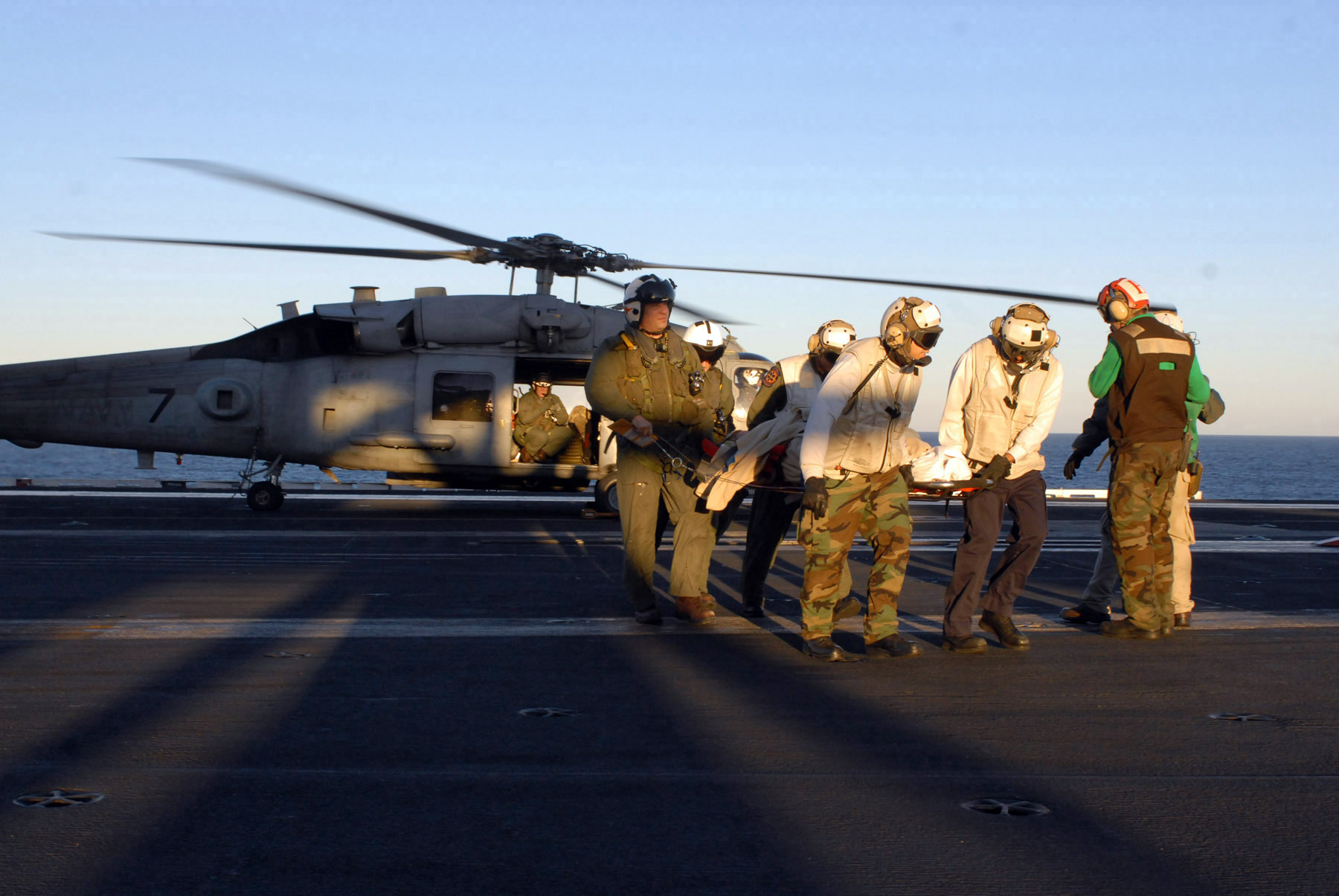
MEDEVAC (15 December 2007)

During the exercises, during the early morning hours of 15 December 2007, Ronald Reagan responded to a medical emergency aboard the Bermuda-flagged cruise ship Dawn Princess off the coast of southern Baja California, Mexico. Two HH-60 helicopters from HS-2 were dispatched to carry out an emergency medical evacuation of a 14-year-old American girl back to the carrier. Once aboard the Reagan (pictured), an emergency appendectomy was performed by the ship's medical department. The Reagan returned to NAS San Diego on 18 December 2007, having achieved an outstanding score during the workup.

On 17 March 2008, the group departed NAS North Island, to conduct its Composite Training Unit Exercise. The exercise was designed to test the strike group's ability to operate in complex, hostile environments as a single unit, and was evaluated by Commander, Strike Force Training Pacific. On 7 April 2008, the group returned to its home base of NAS North Island. Four days later, on 11 April 2008, the group left port again to begin Joint Task Force Exercise 08-5. Joining the Reagan and CVW-14 were the guided-missile cruiser Chancellorsville; the guided-missile destroyers Gridley (pictured), Howard, and Decatur; and the guided-missile frigate Thach. The exercise was the final preparative step for the 2008 deployment. On 22 April 2008, the group returned to base.

On 19 May 2008, the group departed from NAS North Island for its 2008 Western Pacific/Middle East deployment. Escorts for the deployment included USS Chancellorsville (CG-62), USS Gridley (DDG-101), USS Howard (DDG-83), USS Decatur (DDG-73) and USS Thach (FFG-43). On 27 May 2008, the group began an undersea warfare exercise in the waters off Hawaii which included two attack submarines.

The group cut short its port visit to Hong Kong and was ordered to provide humanitarian assistance for the island of Panay in the Philippines, in the aftermath of Typhoon Fengshen. The group's helicopters made 19 relief sorties to deliver food and bottled water to areas most affected by Typhoon Fengshen, and C-2 Greyhounds from the Reagan flew in additional supplies. In addition to the relief flights, a four-man engineering team from the Ronald Reagan engineers repaired Iloilo City's hospital generators damaged by the floods. After bringing a mud-damaged fuel pump aboard the ship for repair, the team returned to Iloilo City's Barotac Viejo Hospital and restored electrical power. On 3 July 2008, the group departed the Sulu Sea and Panay. During its relief mission, the strike group flew 332 sorties over eight consecutive days delivering more than 235,000 kg of fresh water, rice, and medical supplies to typhoon victims in Panay. Soon afterwards, USS Howard was detached to take part on the fourth annual Southeast Asia Cooperation Against Terrorism (SEACAT) exercise which began in Singapore on 18 August 2008.

The group then participated in Exercise Malabar 2008 with the Indian Navy from 20–24 October 2008. The Arabian Sea exercise involved surface, air and sub-surface training. On 28 August 2008, the group relieved Carrier Strike Group Nine and launched its first sorties supporting U.S. and coalition ground forces of the International Security Assistance Force. A total of more than 1,150 ground support sorties were flown during the deployment. Meanwhile, Decatur and Thach joined Combined Task Force 152 operating in the Persian Gulf, while the guided-missile destroyers Gridley and Howard patrolled the Arabian Sea and Gulf of Aden as part of Combined Task Force 150.

On 28 May 2009, the group departed San Diego, California, to begin its 2009 Western Pacific/Middle East deployment. The group entered the U.S. Seventh Fleet's area on 9 June 2009. During the deployment, Carrier Air Wing Fourteen flew more than 1,600 sorties supporting troops in Afghanistan. The destroyers Decatur, Howard, and Gridley, and the frigate Thach, supported maritime security operations in the Persian Gulf, Arabian Sea, Gulf of Oman, Gulf of Aden, and Red Sea. For example, during July 2009, the Thatch was assigned by Commander, Task Group Iraqi Maritime (CTG-IM) to serve as a picket ship patrolling the Al Basrah Oil Terminal in the northern Persian Gulf. On 18 September 2009, Rear Admiral Thomas S. Rowden relieved Rear Admiral Hebner as strike group commander. The group returned to its home base at NAS North Island on 31 October 2009.

== 2010 operations ==
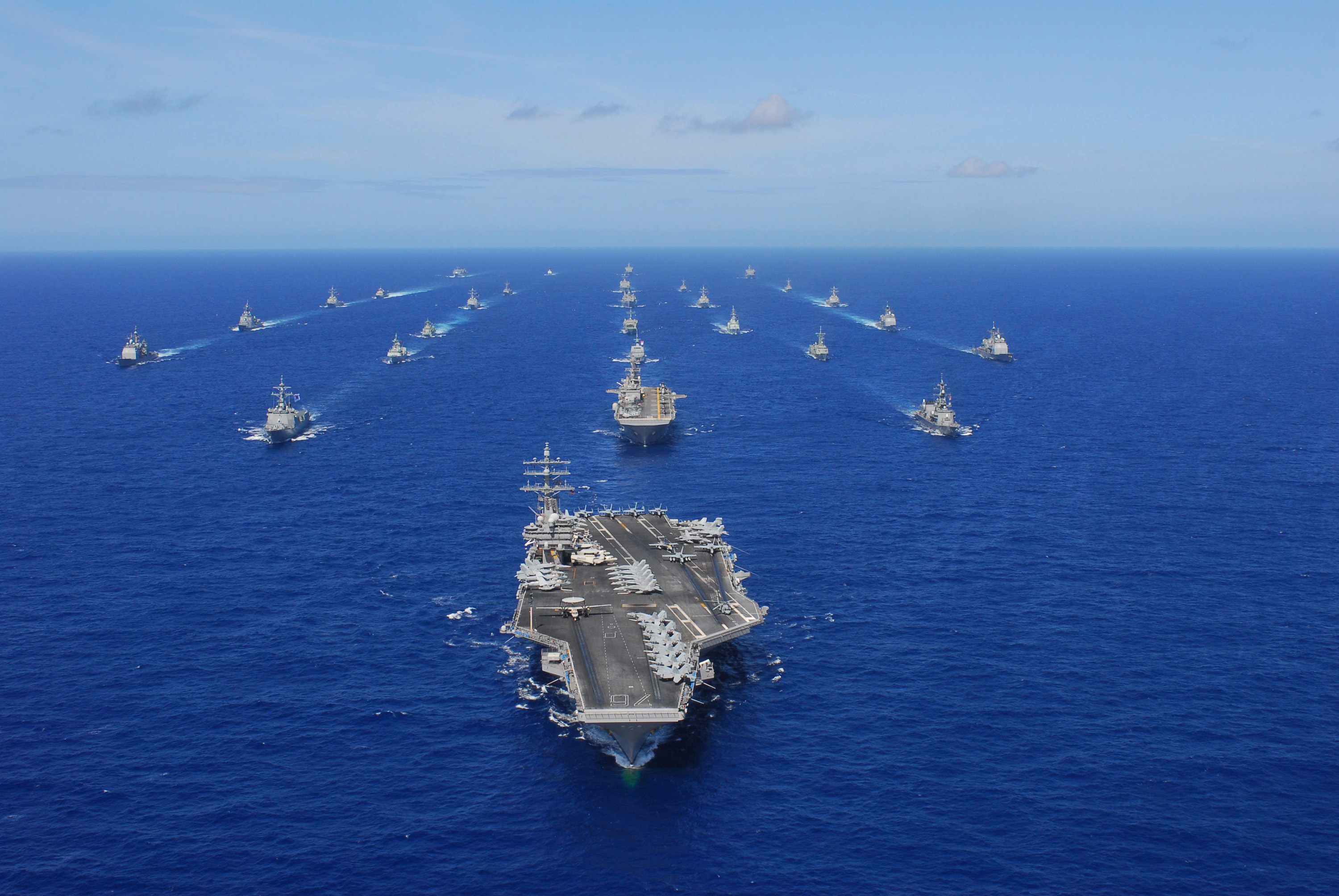
RIMPAC 2010 photo exercise, with Ronald Reagan center

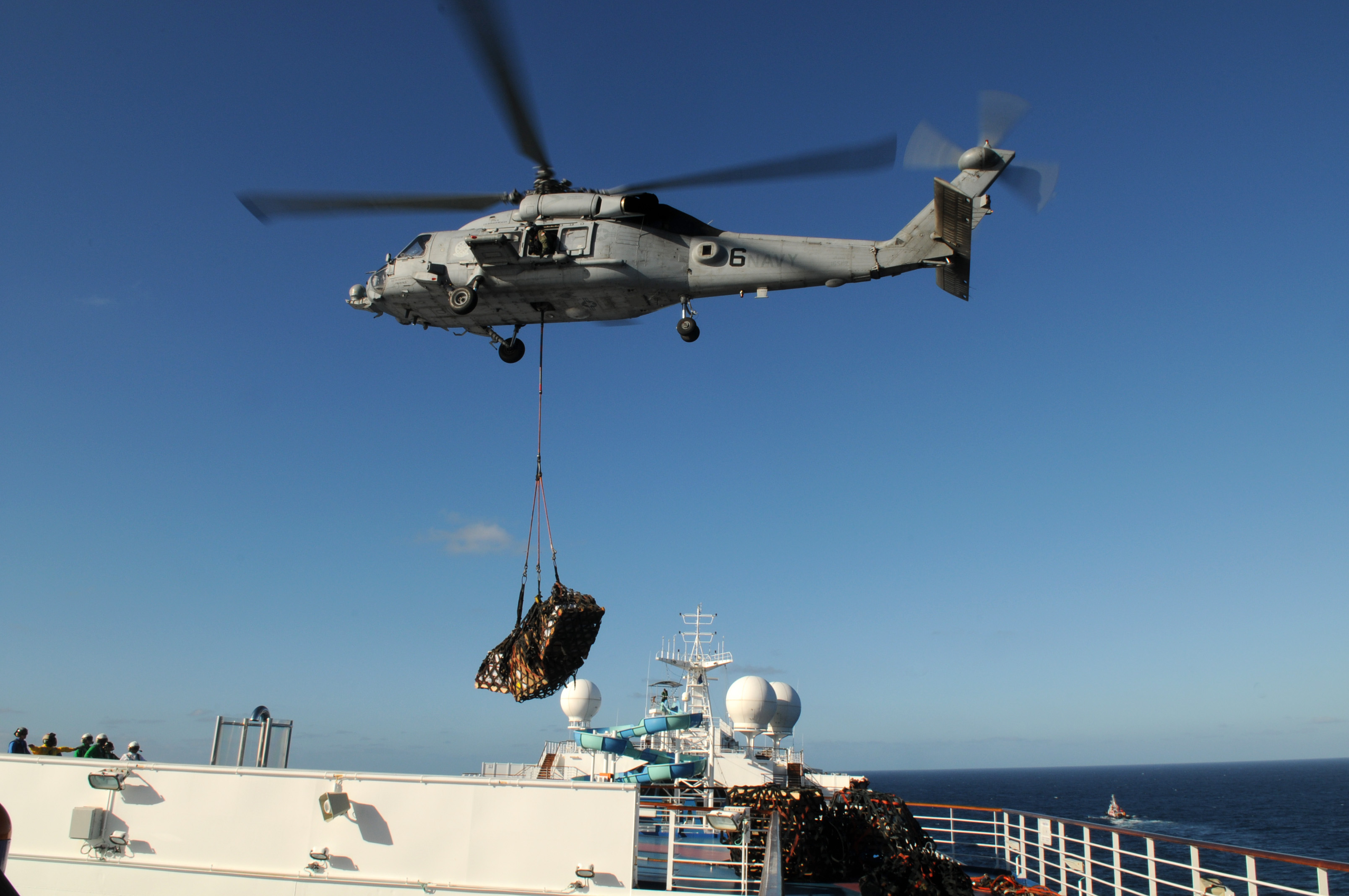
A Navy HH-60 delivers supplies to Carnival Splendor on 9 November 2010

In late 2009 a six-month maintenance period on the Ronald Reagan began at NAS North Island. Ship refurbishments ranged from hi-tech combat systems and firefighting equipment to improved ship's laundry services and living spaces. On 18 May 2010, Ronald Reagan departed NAS North Island for sea trials. The Reagan returned after the sea trials to NAS North Island on 19 May 2010. Reagan conducted flight deck certification from 2 June 2010.

On 28 June 2010, Ronald Reagan arrived in Pearl Harbor to participate in Exercise Rim of the Pacific (RIMPAC) 2010. Ronald Reagan was the only aircraft carrier to participate (pictured). During the in-port phase of RIMPAC, officers and crew of the 14 participating navies interacted in receptions, meetings, and athletic events. At sea such as live fire gunnery and missile exercises; maritime interdiction and vessel boardings, and anti-surface warfare, undersea warfare, and air defense training serials took place followed by scenario exercises in Phase III. During RIMPAC 2010, naval personnel from Singapore, Japan, Australia, Chile, Peru, and Colombia directed combat exercises while aboard the Reagan. They managed anti-submarine warfare and surface warfare for the group and the entire RIMPAC force. Also, Reagan conducted a live RIM-116 Rolling Airframe Missile launch, the first since 2007.

On 30 July 2010, RIMPAC 2010 ended with a Pearl Harbor press conference. A reception for over 1,500 participants, distinguished visitors and special guests was held in the Reagan's hangar bay. On 8 August 2010, she returned to her homeport after a nearly two-month underway period.

On 18 October 2010 Ronald Reagan departed for its Composite Training Unit Exercise. Over the next three weeks, flight operations were conducted nearly continuously under simulated combat conditions. Ronald Reagan also simulated a straits transit with four ships from the strike group, participated in three opposed replenishments at sea, a vertical replenishment, and ran many general quarters and man overboard drills. On 9 November 2010, the Reagan was diverted to provide assistance to the disabled cruise ship Carnival Splendor (pictured). On 14 November, the Ronald Reagan and its embarked carrier air wing completed its COMPTUEX successfully, and it returned to port on 17 December 2010.

== 2011 deployment ==
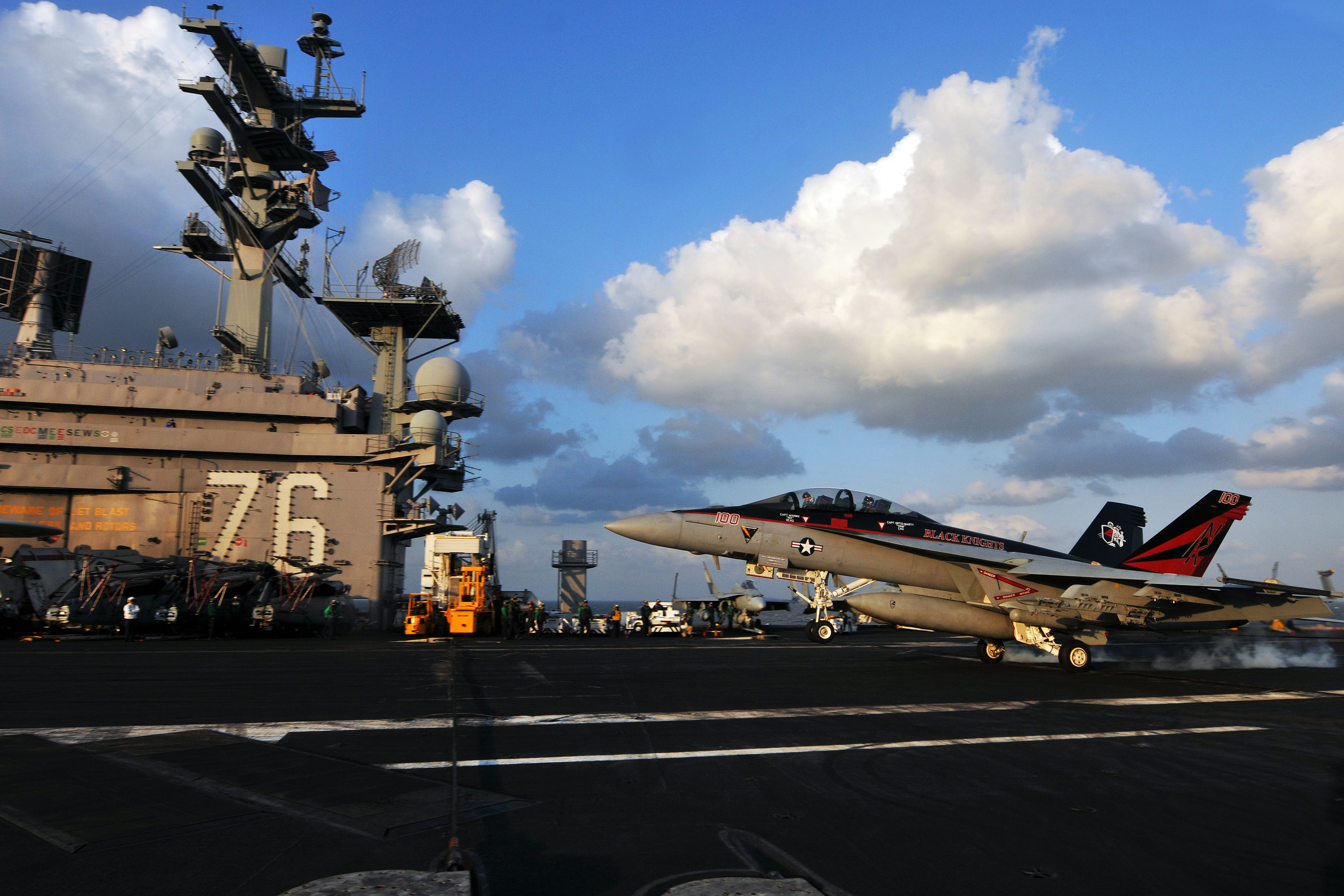
1000 landing (18 April 2011)

In February 2011, Rear Admiral Robert P. Girrier took command of the group. On 2 February 2011, the group departed NAS North Island for its Joint Task Force Exercise final deployment preparations. On 5 March 2011 the group completed the JTFEX, and began its 2011 deployment.

Carrier Strike Group Seven entered the U.S. Seventh Fleet area of responsibility (AOR) on 9 March 2011.

On 9 May 2011, Carrier Strike Group Seven entered the U.S. Fifth Fleet's area of responsibility, and Carrier Air Wing Fourteen (CVW-14) launched its first combat sorties in support of Operation Enduring Freedom – Afghanistan (OEF-A) (pictured). On 9 May 2011, the group entered the U.S. Fifth Fleet area, and its air wing began to launch combat sorties against the Taliban and al-Qaeda in Afghanistan. U.S. Army liaison officers were embarked to coordinate with coalition ground troops. The carrier strike group launched over 900 air sorties supporting ground forces in Afghanistan.

During a visit to the carrier Ronald Reagan on 15 June 2011, Fifth Fleet commander Vice Admiral Mark I. Fox noted the contribution that strike group made:

You are conducting operations to support our troops on the ground every single day from the flight deck of this ship. I am truly impressed with the way that the entire CSG has conducted its operation; you guys have been hitting it out of the ballpark.

Carrier Strike Group Seven returned to its home base Naval Air Station North Island in Coronado, California, on 9 September 2011, completing its 2011 WESTPAC deployment. A deployment highlight occurred on 18 April 2011 when Captain Kevin "Nix" Mannix made his 1,000th arrested landing when he landed his F/A-18F Super Hornet from Strike Fighter Squadron 154 on the flight deck of the Ronald Reagan (pictured). Captain Mannix was the deputy commander of Carrier Air Wing 14.

=== 2011 deployment force composition ===
Units	CARSTRKGRU 7 Warships	Carrier Air Wing Fourteen (CVW-14) squadrons embarked aboard flagship USS Ronald Reagan (CVN-76)	
No. 1	USS Chancellorsville (CG-62)	Marine Fighter Attack Squadron 323 (VMFA-323): 12 F/A-18C(N)	Electronic Attack Squadron 139 (VAQ-139): 4 EA-6B
No. 2	USS Preble (DDG-88)	Strike Fighter Squadron 154 (VFA-154): 12 F/A-18F	Carrier Airborne Early Warning Squadron 113 (VAW-113): 4 E-2C HE2K NP
No. 3	USS Higgins (DDG-76) (Note: USS Higgins departed Naval Base San Diego for an independent deployment to the U.S. Fifth Fleet Area of Responsibility (AOR) on 20 January 2011 and joined Carrier Strike Group Seven at Hong Kong on 12 August 2011.)	Strike Fighter Squadron 147 (VFA-147): 12 F/A-18E	Helicopter Anti-Submarine Squadron Four (HS-4): 5 SH-60F & 3 HH-60H
No. 4	—	Strike Fighter Squadron 146 (VFA-146): 10 F/A-18C	Carrier Logistics Support Squadron 30 (VRC-30), Det. 1: 4 C-2A
Notes			

=== Operation Tomodachi ===
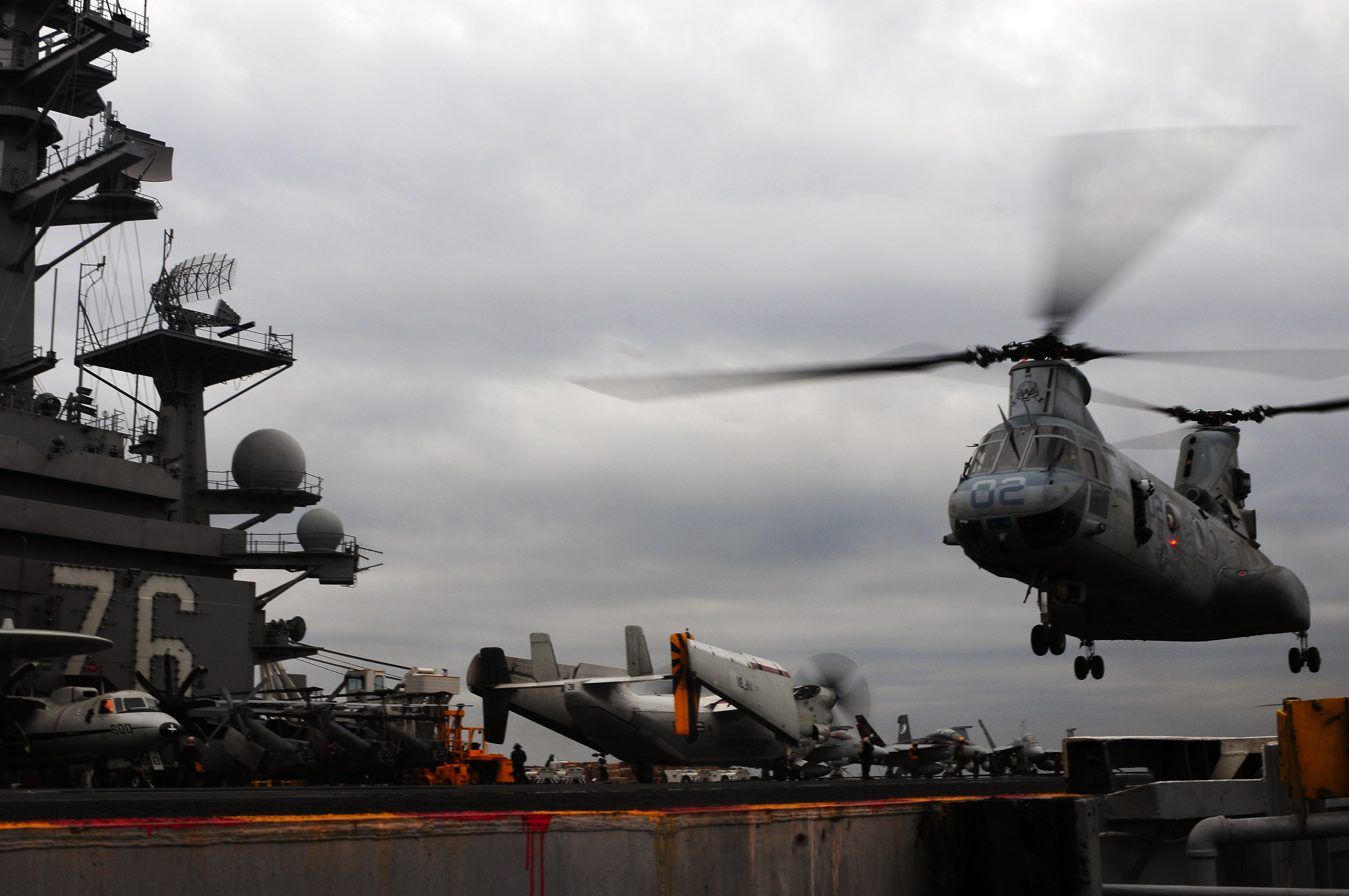
Operation Tomodachi

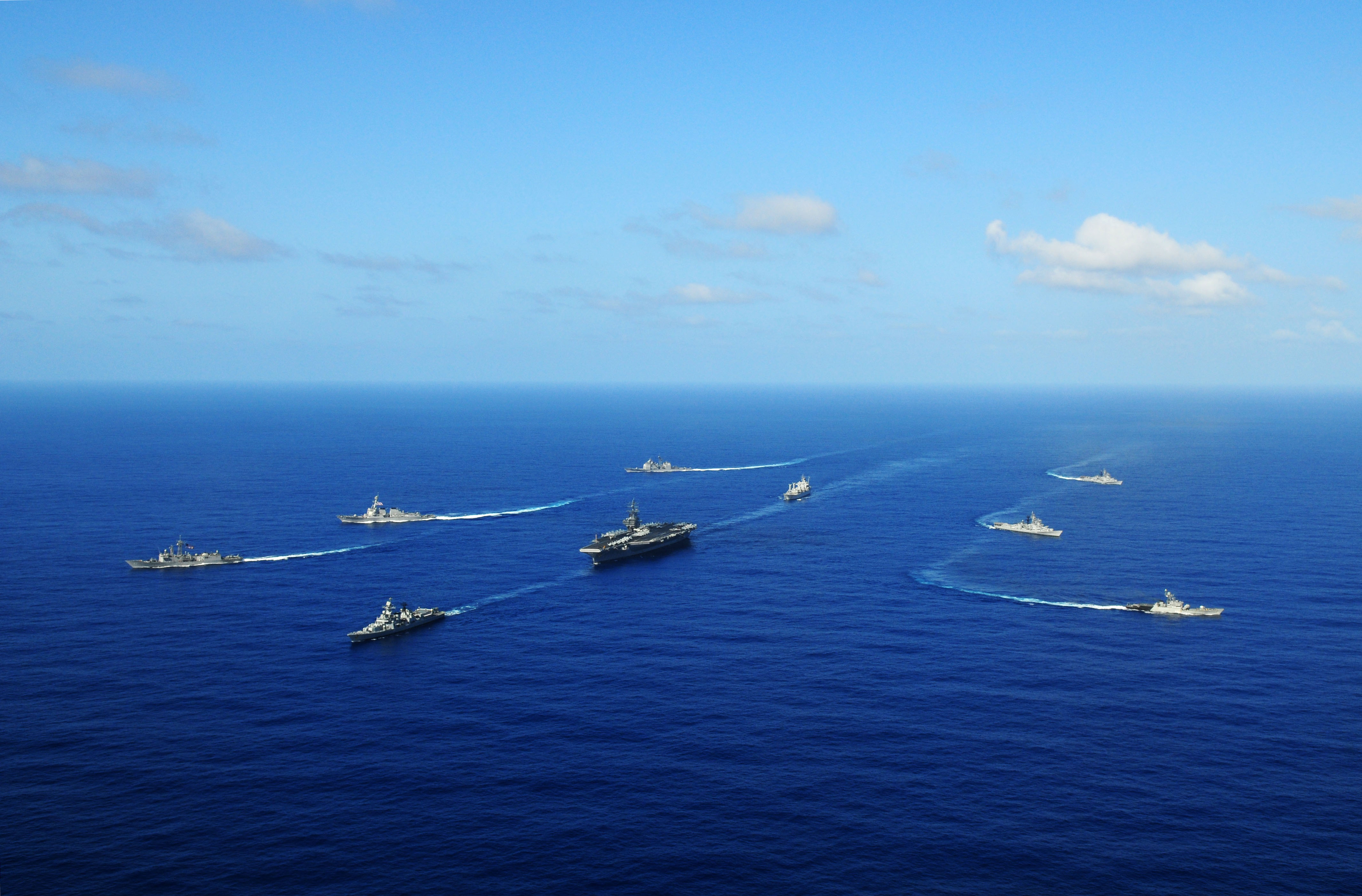
Ships of the Strike Group with the Indian Navy during Malabar 2011

In the aftermath of the 2011 Tōhoku earthquake and tsunami, Carrier Strike Group Seven was dispatched to take part in the U.S. military relief effort, Operation Tomodachi. It appears that the unplanned Japan disaster relief operations meant the carrier strike group's planned participation in Exercise Key Resolve/Foal Eagle 2011 in Korea was cancelled. A planned port call to Busan, in South Korea was cancelled, and the group was the first U.S. naval force to arrive. It arrived off the east coast of Honshu on 13 March 2011 and immediately began supporting relief operations.

Ronald Reagan served as a platform for refueling Japan Self Defense Force and other helicopters involved in rescue and recovery efforts ashore (pictured). Chancellorsville also began providing relief support while operating off the coast of Miyagi Prefecture. Preble provided more than 700 pounds of supplies to earthquake and tsunami survivors, and also used its embarked helicopters to survey the coastline.

Approaching Sendai, Japan on 13 March 2011, sensors aboard Reagan detected nuclear radiation. Reagan's nuclear-trained personnel established a Radiation Control Central in response. Ten days later, on 23 March 2011, the Reagan conducted a fresh water washdown on its flight deck and embarked aircraft, to remove any traces of radioactive contamination.

On 4 April 2011, Carrier Strike Group Seven concluded its involvement in Operation Tomodachi after being thanked by Japanese Defense Minister Toshimi Kitazawa and U.S. ambassador to Japan John Roos during a visit to the Reagan.

=== Exercise Malabar 2011 ===
Because of its involvement in Operation Tomodachi, the group was able to participate in the U.S./Indian Exercise Malabar 2011 (pictured) between 2–9 April 2011. It was held east of the Luzon Strait, and east of Okinawa. U.S. naval units initially included guided-missile destroyers Sterett and Stethem; the guided-missile frigate Reuben James; and a nuclear powered attack submarine. Indian naval units included the guided-missile destroyers Delhi, Ranvijay, and INS Ranvir (D54); the corvette INS Kirch (P62); and the replenishment tanker Jyoti.

A deployment highlight occurred on 18 April 2011 when Captain Kevin "Nix" Mannix made his 1,000th arrested landing when he landed his F/A-18F Super Hornet from Strike Fighter Squadron 154 on the flight deck of the Ronald Reagan (pictured). Captain Mannix was the deputy commander of Carrier Air Wing 14.

=== 2011 deployment exercises and port visits ===
Number	Regional Exercises				Port Visits		Notes
Number	Duration	U.S. Force	Joint/Bilateral/Multilateral Partner(s)	Operating Area	Location	Dates	Notes
1st:	2 Feb	Chancellorsville	Solid Curtain-Citadel Shield 2011	Pearl Harbor	—	—	
3rd:	28 Feb to 6 Mar	Preble	Oceania Maritime Security Initiative: U.S. Coast Guard	Western Pacific	Pearl Harbor	19 Feb	
3rd:	2–9 April	Carrier Strike Group Seven	Malabar 2011: Indian Navy	Western Pacific	Sasebo, Japan	19 Apr	
4th:	—	Carrier Strike Group Seven	—	—	Phuket, Thailand	1–5 May 2011	
5th:	—	Carrier Strike Group Seven	—	—	Al Hidd, Bahrain	22–26 May	
6th:	—	Preble	—	—	Singapore	29 Jun	
7th:	—	Preble	—	—	Muara, Brunei	4–9 Jul	
8th:	—	Preble	—	—	Da Nang, Vietnam	15 Jul	
9th:	—	Carrier Strike Group Seven	—	—	Hong Kong	12–16 Aug	
10th:	—	Carrier Strike Group Seven	—	—	Apra Harbor, Guam	21 Aug	
11th:	—	Carrier Strike Group Seven	—	—	Pearl Harbor	31 Aug to 3 Sep	

== Force composition and exercises, 2007–2011 ==
2007 deployment

Units	Group warships	Carrier Air Wing Fourteen squadrons	
No. 1	USS Lake Champlain (CG-57)	Strike Fighter Squadron 115 (VFA-115): F/A-18E	Electronic Attack Squadron 139 (VAQ-139): EA-6B
No. 2	USS Paul Hamilton (DDG-60)	Strike Fighter Squadron 113 (VFA-113): F/A-18E	Airborne Early Warning Squadron 113 (VAW-113): E-2C 2000
No. 3	USS Russell (DDG-59)	Strike Fighter Squadron 25 (VFA-25): F/A-18C(N)	Helicopter Anti-Submarine Squadron Four (HS-4): SH-60F/HH-60H
No. 4	EOD Unit 11, Det. 15	Strike Fighter Squadron 22 (VFA-22): F/A-18C(N)	Carrier Logistics Support Squadron 30 (VRC-30): C-2A
Notes			

No changes in the air wing between 2006 & 2007; only change before 2008 deployment being the VAW.

2008 deployment

Units	CARSTRKGRU 7 Warships	Carrier Air Wing Fourteen (CVW-14) squadrons embarked aboard flagship USS Ronald Reagan (CVN-76)	
No. 1	USS Chancellorsville (CG-62)	Strike Fighter Squadron 115 (VFA-115): 12 F/A-18E	Carrier Airborne Early Warning Squadron 113 (VAW-113): 4 E-2C
No. 2	USS Gridley (DDG-101)	Strike Fighter Squadron 113 (VFA-113): 10 F/A-18C(N)	Helicopter Anti-Submarine Squadron Four (HS-4): 7 SH-60F/HH-60H
No. 3	USS Howard (DDG-83)	Strike Fighter Squadron 25 (VFA-25): 12 F/A-18C(N)	Carrier Logistics Support Squadron 30 (VRC-30), Det. 1: 4 C-2A
No. 4	USS Decatur (DDG-73)	Strike Fighter Squadron 22 (VFA-22): 12 F/A-18F	
No. 5	USS Thach (FFG-43)	Electronic Attack Squadron 139 (VAQ-139): 4 EA-6B	—
Notes			

2009 deployment

Units	CARSTRKGRU 7 Warships	Carrier Air Wing Fourteen (CVW-14) squadrons embarked aboard flagship USS Ronald Reagan (CVN-76)	
No. 1	USS Chancellorsville (CG-62)	Strike Fighter Squadron 115 (VFA-115): 12 F/A-18E	Carrier Airborne Early Warning Squadron 113 (VAW-113): 4 E-2C
No. 2	USS Gridley (DDG-101)	Strike Fighter Squadron 113 (VFA-113): 10 F/A-18C(N)	Helicopter Anti-Submarine Squadron Four (HS-4): 7 SH-60F/HH-60H
No. 3	USS Howard (DDG-83)	Strike Fighter Squadron 25 (VFA-25): 12 F/A-18C(N)	Carrier Logistics Support Squadron 30 (VRC-30), Det. 1: 4 C-2A
No. 4	USS Decatur (DDG-73)	Strike Fighter Squadron 22 (VFA-22): 12 F/A-18F	—
No. 5	USS Thach (FFG-43)	Electronic Attack Squadron 139 (VAQ-139): 4 EA-6B	—
Notes			

=== Exercises and port visits ===
2006 deployment

Regional Exercises				Port Visits		Notes
Dates	U.S. Force	Joint/Bilateral/Multilateral Partner(s)	Operating Area	Location	Dates	Notes
9–12 Jan	Carrier Strike Group Seven	Anti-Submarine Warfare (ASW) exercise	Hawaiian operating area	Brisbane, Australia	23–27 Jan	
—	Carrier Strike Group Seven	—	—	Singapore	7 Feb	
—	McCampbell	—	—	Republic of Maldives	17 Feb	
—	Carrier Strike Group Seven	—	—	Jebel Ali, UAE	15–19 Mar	
—	Carrier Strike Group Seven	—	—	Jebel Ali, UAE	16–20 Apr	
27 April	Carrier Strike Group Seven	Passing Exercise with French carrier Charles de Gaulle and frigate Cassard	Arabian Sea	Jebel Ali, UAE	14–18 May	
29 Apr	McCampbell, Catawba	Royal Bahrain Naval Force	Mina Salman, Bahrain	—	—	
—	Carrier Strike Group Seven	—	—	Port Kelang, Malaysia	3–5 June	
—	McCampbell	—	—	Hong Kong	3 June	
—	Decatur	—	—	Phuket, Thailand	2–5 June	
16 June	Carrier Strike Group Seven	Valiant Shield 2006	Guam operating area	Hong Kong	10–13 Jun	

2007 deployment

Number	Regional Exercises				Port Visits		Notes
Number	Duration	U.S. Force	Bilateral/Multilateral Partner(s)	Operating Area	Location	Dates	Notes
1st:	—	Carrier Strike Group Seven	—	—	Sasebo, Japan	24 Feb	
2nd:	16–18 Mar	Carrier Strike Group Seven	PASSEX: JMSDF ships JDS Myōkō, Hamagiri, Yuugiri, and Haruna	Philippine Sea	Hong Kong	7 March 2007	
4th:	25–31 March	Carrier Strike Group Seven	RSOI/Foal Eagle 2007: Republic of Korea Armed Forces	Waters off Korea	Russell to Chinhae on 22 March 2007	22 March	
6th	—	Carrier Strike Group Seven	—	—	Pearl Harbor	9 April	
7th:	10 Jun – 25 Jul	Paul Hamilton	Talisman Saber 2007: Australian Defence Force	Coral Sea	Brisbane, Australia	10 June 2007	

2008 deployment

Number	Regional Exercises				Port Visits		Notes
Number	Duration	U.S. Force	Joint/Bilateral/Multilateral Partner(s)	Operating Area	Location	Dates	Notes
1st:	27 May	Carrier Strike Group Seven	Undersea Warfare Exercise (USWEX)	Hawaiian operating area	Hong Kong	19–22 Jun	
2nd:	—	Carrier Strike Group Seven	—	—	Apra Harbor, Guam	6 Jul	
3rd:	—	Ronald Reagan, Chancellorsville	—	—	Busan, ROK	14 Jul	
4th:	—	Howard , Decatur, Thatch	—	—	Chinhae	14–18 Jul	
5th:	—	Ronald Reagan, Howard	—	—	Sasebo, Japan	28 Jul to 1 Aug	
6th:	—	Chancellorsville, Thach	—	—	Yokosuka	28 Jul to 1 Aug	
7th:	—	Gridley	—	—	Fukuoka	28 Jul to 1 Aug	
8th:	17–20 Aug	Howard	Malaysian, Indonesian, Singaporean, and Philippine Navies	—	—	—	
9th:	—	Carrier Strike Group Seven	—	—	Port Kelang, Malaysia	18–21 Aug	
10th:	15–24 Oct	Carrier Strike Group Seven	Malabar 2008: Indian Navy	Arabian Sea	Goa, India	18 Oct	
11th:	1 Nov	Chancellorsville, Decatur	PASSEX: HTMS Chao Phraya	Andaman Sea	—	—	
12th:	—	Carrier Strike Group Seven	—	—	Singapore	25 Oct	
13th:	—	Carrier Strike Group Seven	—	—	Pearl Harbor	17 Nov	

2009 deployment

Number	Regional Exercises				Port Visits		Notes
Number	Duration	U.S. Force	Bilateral/Multilateral Partner(s)	Operating Area	Location	Dates	Notes
1st:	—	Carrier Strike Group Seven	—	—	Singapore	4 Jun	
2nd:	—	Gridley, Thatch	—	—	Phuket, Thailand	25 Jun	
3rd:	—	Decatur	—	—	Yokosuka, Japan	4 Jul	
4th:	—	Carrier Strike Group Seven	—	—	Phuket, Thailand	22 Sep	
5th:	—	Carrier Strike Group Seven	—	—	Pearl Harbor	13 Oct	

2011 deployment

Number	Regional Exercises				Port Visits		Notes
Number	Duration	U.S. Force	Joint/Bilateral/Multilateral Partner(s)	Operating Area	Location	Dates	Notes
1st:	2 Feb	Chancellorsville	Solid Curtain-Citadel Shield 2011	Pearl Harbor	—	—	
3rd:	28 Feb to 6 Mar	Preble	Oceania Maritime Security Initiative: U.S. Coast Guard	Western Pacific	Pearl Harbor	19 Feb	
3rd:	2–9 April	Carrier Strike Group Seven	Malabar 2011: Indian Navy	Western Pacific	Sasebo, Japan	19 Apr	
4th:	—	Carrier Strike Group Seven	—	—	Phuket, Thailand	1–5 May 2011	
5th:	—	Carrier Strike Group Seven	—	—	Al Hidd, Bahrain	22–26 May	
6th:	—	Preble	—	—	Singapore	29 Jun	
7th:	—	Preble	—	—	Muara, Brunei	4–9 Jul	
8th:	—	Preble	—	—	Da Nang, Vietnam	15 Jul	
9th:	—	Carrier Strike Group Seven	—	—	Hong Kong	12–16 Aug	
10th:	—	Carrier Strike Group Seven	—	—	Apra Harbor, Guam	21 Aug	
11th:	—	Carrier Strike Group Seven	—	—	Pearl Harbor	31 Aug to 3 Sep	

== Deactivation ==
On 1 August 2011 the Navy announced that Carrier Strike Group Seven was scheduled for deactivation effective 30 December 2011. Following the de-activation of Carrier Strike Group Seven, Ronald Reagan was reassigned as the flagship for Carrier Strike Group Nine. At the time of its disestablishment in 2011, Carrier Strike Group Seven was composed of the following units:

- USS Ronald Reagan (CVN-76), flagship
- Carrier Air Wing Fourteen
- USS Chancellorsville (CG-62)
- Destroyer Squadron Seven:
  - USS Gridley (DDG-101)
  - USS Howard (DDG-83)
  - USS Decatur (DDG-73)
  - USS Benfold (DDG-65)
  - USS Thach (FFG-43)

In total, aircraft carriers assigned to the formation made a total of 34 deployments to the Western Pacific Ocean and Persian Gulf.

== Notes ==
Footnotes

Citations
