= Carrier Air Wing Fourteen =

CVW-14
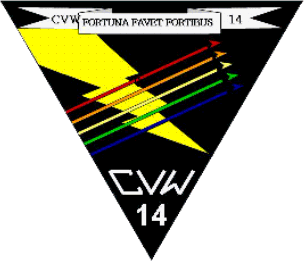
- CVW-14 Insignia
- Active: July 1950 – March 2017
- Country: United States
- Branch: United States Navy
- Type: Carrier air wing
- Part of: United States Pacific Fleet
- Garrison/HQ: NAS Lemoore
- Tail Code: NK
- Engagements: Korean War; Vietnam War; Operation Desert Shield; Operation Desert Storm; Operation Southern Watch; Operation Desert Strike; Operation Enduring Freedom; Operation Iraqi Freedom; Operation Northern Edge

Carrier Air Wing Fourteen (CVW-14), was a United States Navy aircraft carrier air wing based at Naval Air Station Lemoore, California.

== Mission ==
To conduct carrier air warfare operations and assist in the planning, control, coordination and integration of seven air wing squadrons in support of carrier air warfare including; Interception and destruction of enemy aircraft and missiles in all-weather conditions to establish and maintain local air superiority. All-weather offensive air-to-surface attacks, Detection, localization, and destruction of enemy ships and submarines to establish and maintain local sea control. Aerial photographic, sighting, and electronic intelligence for naval and joint operations. Airborne early warning service to fleet forces and shore warning nets. Airborne electronic countermeasures. In-flight refueling operations to extend the range and the endurance of air wing aircraft and Search and rescue operations.

== Subordinate units ==
During the 2011 deployment the following squadrons were assigned to CVW-14: There are no squadrons currently assigned to CVW-14

Code	Insignia	Squadron	Nickname	Assigned Aircraft
VFA-154		Strike Fighter Squadron 154	Black Knights	F/A-18F Super Hornet
VFA-147		Strike Fighter Squadron 147	Argonauts	F/A-18E Super Hornet
VFA-146		Strike Fighter Squadron 146	Blue Diamonds	F/A-18C Hornet
VMFA-323		Marine Fighter Attack Squadron 323	Death Rattlers	F/A-18C(N) Hornet
VAW-113		Carrier Airborne Early Warning Squadron 113	Black Eagles	E-2C Hawkeye 2000 NP
VAQ-139		Carrier Tactical Electronic Warfare Squadron 139	Cougars	EA-6B Prowler
VRC-30		Fleet Logistics Support Squadron 30 Det. 1	Providers	C-2 Greyhound
HS-4		Helicopter Anti-submarine Squadron 4	Black Knights	SH-60F/HH-60H Seahawk

== History ==
=== Korean War ===
Carrier Air Wing 14 was established at Naval Air Station Miramar, CA as Carrier Air Group 101 on 1 August 1950 to receive United States Navy Reserve squadrons which were activated for participation in the Korean War. It made its first deployment aboard USS Kearsarge. On 4 February 1952, CVG-101 was redesignated Carrier Air Group 14 (CVG-14).

=== Vietnam War ===
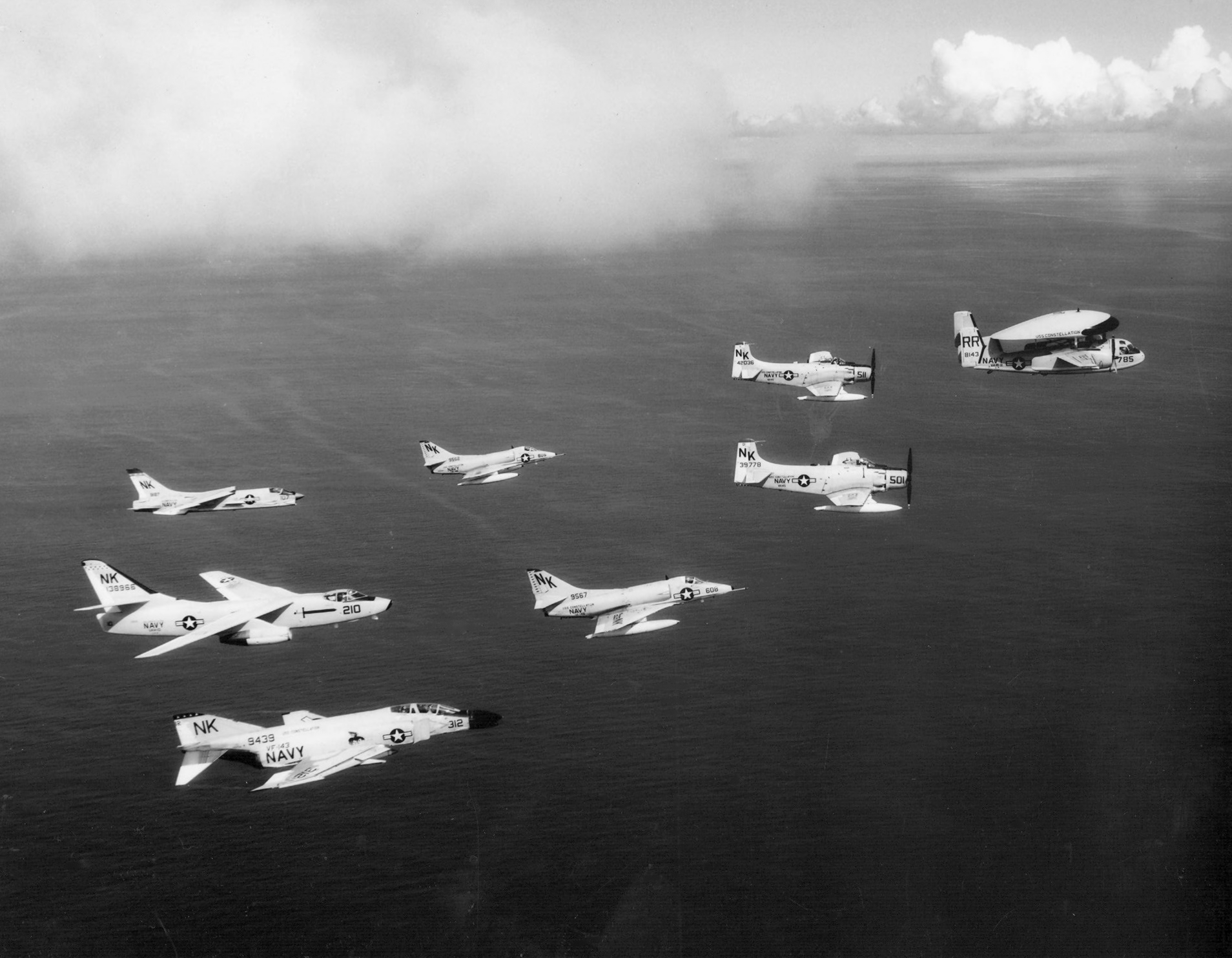
CVW-14 aircraft in flight in 1963, while assigned to USS Constellation.

On 20 December 1963 all Carrier Air Groups were re-designated Carrier Air Wings and CVG-14 became Carrier Air Wing Fourteen (CVW-14). In August 1964, while embarked aboard USS Constellation, CVW-14 conducted the first air strikes against North Vietnam. Subsequent combat deployments were made aboard USS Ranger, Constellation and USS Enterprise. On 27 January 1973, Air Wing 14 squadrons flew the last combat sorties of the Vietnam War. In June 1973, CVW-14 became the first operational air wing to receive the F-14A Tomcat. In September 1974, CVW-14 deployed aboard Enterprise for its first peacetime deployment in ten years. On 29 April 1975, CVW-14 was again involved in Vietnam, providing support and air cover for the evacuation of U.S. personnel from South Vietnam during Operation Frequent Wind.

On 30 July 1976, CVW-14 embarked aboard Enterprise again for the first S-3A Viking Western Pacific deployment. After one more deployment on Enterprise, Carrier Air Wing 14 was reassigned to USS Coral Sea. Two U.S. Marine Corps fighter squadrons, VMFA-323 and VMFA-531 (F-4N "Phantom II"), joined the CVW-14 team, marking the first time since World War II that two Marine fighter squadrons comprised the fighter arm of a Navy Air Wing. CVW-14 embarked on Coral Sea in November 1979 en route to the Western Pacific and a continuous 102-day at-sea period on "Gonzo" Station in the North Arabian Sea. CVW-14 made two more deployments on Coral Sea.

=== Gulf War ===
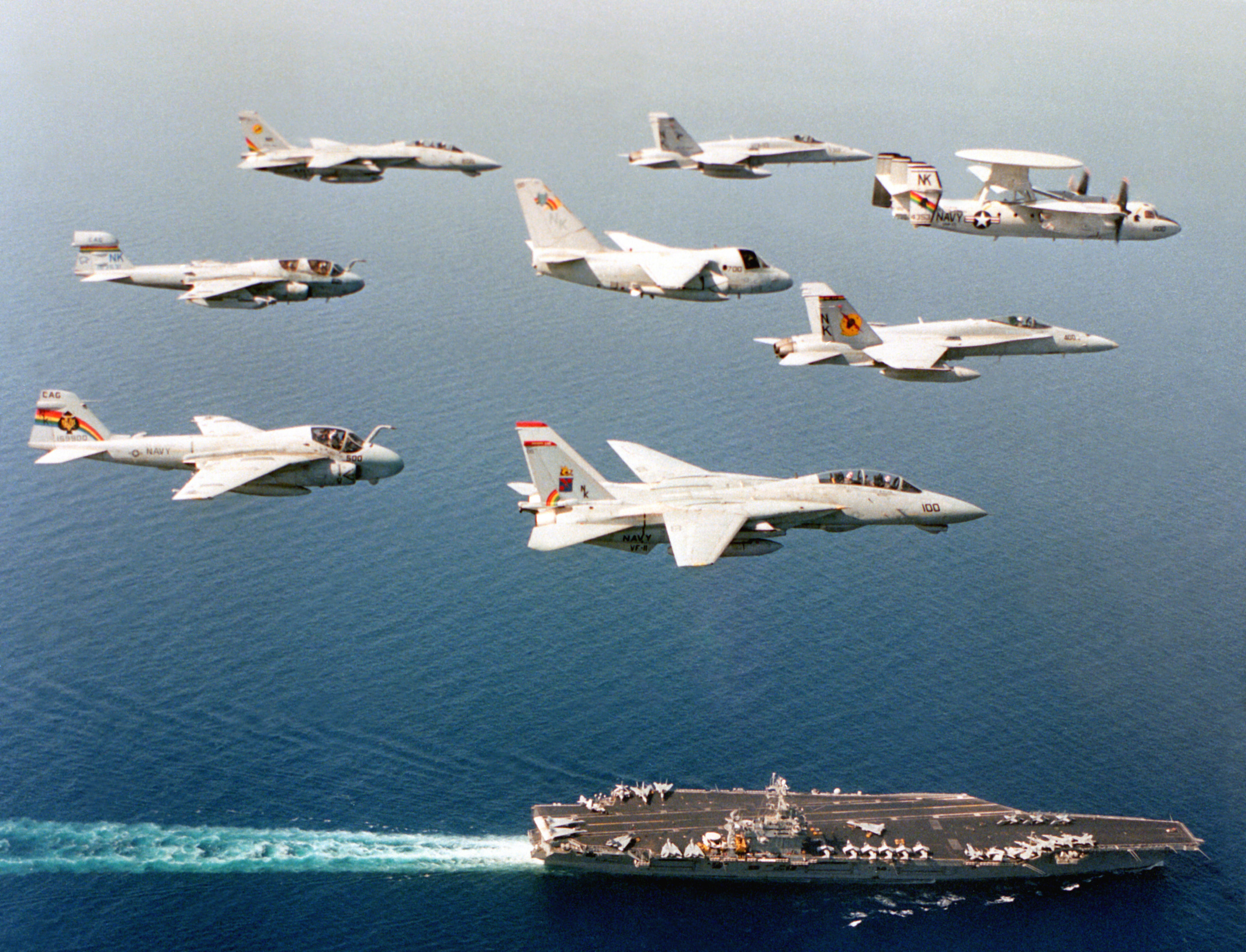
Aircraft from each squadron of CVW-14 fly past USS Carl Vinson in 1994.

While en route to the island of Diego Garcia, CVW-14 and USS Independence were diverted to the North Arabian Sea in support of Operation Desert Shield. Independence arrived on station on 6 August 1990 as part of the United States Central Command buildup.

On 5 August 1991, CVW-14 embarked aboard Independence and commenced transit to Pearl Harbor for swap-out with USS Midway. The CVW-14 staff cross-decked to Midway in Pearl Harbor 24 August. VF-21, VF-154, and VS-21 were detached from CVW-14 but remained on board Independence as part of the CVW-5 organizational structure. CVW-14, then embarked on Midway and returned to San Diego, marking Midway's last operational underway period prior to being decommissioned from active fleet service.

On 17 February 1994, CVW-14 embarked aboard USS Carl Vinson for another WESTPAC deployment, returning 15 August 1994. In May 1996, the air wing deployed again for another WESTPAC on Carl Vinson. During this deployment, the Carl Vinson Task Group took part in Operation Southern Watch and Operation Desert Strike in which USN and USAF forces conducted Tomahawk Land Attack Missile (TLAM) and Conventional Air-Launched Cruise Missile (CALCM) strikes against Iraq in response to Baghdad's invasion of Kurdish-held territory in Northern Iraq. CVW-14 escorted B-52 aircraft in support of their CALCM strikes and subsequently flew numerous sorties to enforce the newly expanded No-Fly Zone to 33 degrees north latitude. The Task Group departed the Fifth Fleet operations area on 8 October and returned to San Diego on 12 November 1996.

On 11 June 1998, CVW-14 moved from NAS Miramar, San Diego, to Naval Air Station Lemoore and deployed on USS Abraham Lincoln for WESTPAC '98 where it participated in Operation Southern Watch and Maritime Interdiction Operations in the Persian Gulf. CVW-14 returned to NAS Lemoore on 7 December 1998.

While deployed aboard Abraham Lincoln in May and June, CVW-14 participated to the Hawaiian operating area in Rim of the Pacific exercise (RIMPAC). In August 2000, CVW-14 deployed on WESTPAC 2000 during which the air wing executed over 1,400 combat sorties over Iraq in support of Operation Southern Watch. CVW-14 returned to Lemoore on 8 February 2001.

=== Global War on Terror ===
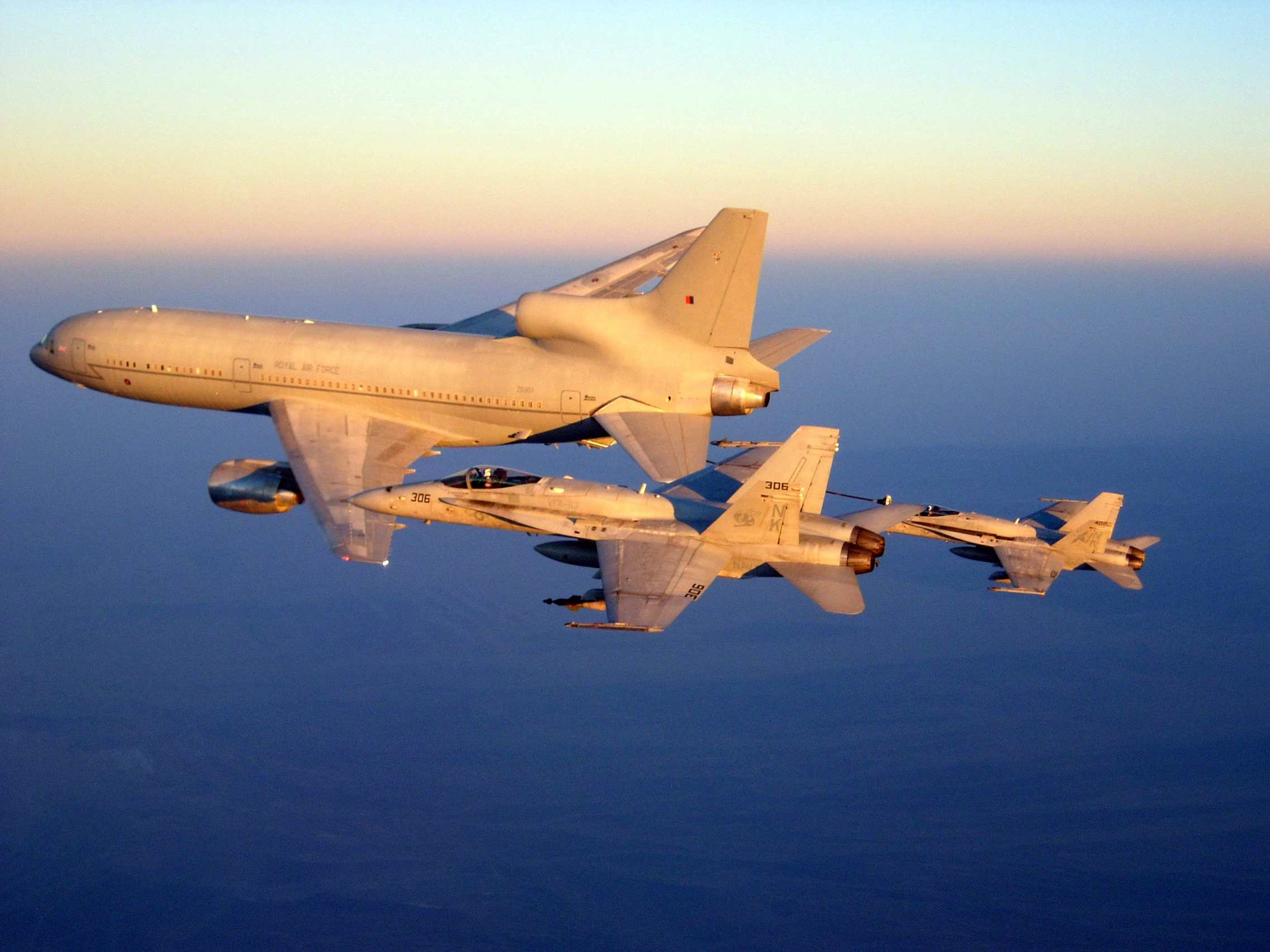
McDonnell-Douglas F/A-18 Hornets of CVW-14 receiving fuel from a Lockheed TriStar K1 of the Royal Air Force over Afghanistan, 2008

In December 2001, CVW-14 participated in Operation Northern Edge off the coast of southern Alaska, honing their skills in final preparations for the 2002–2003 deployment. CVW-14 deployed aboard USS Abraham Lincoln again on 22 July 2002, supporting both on Operation Enduring Freedom in Afghanistan and Operation Iraqi Freedom in Iraq. This marked the first carrier deployment for the multi-mission F/A-18 E/F Super Hornet. In the first 17 days of Operation Iraqi Freedom, CVW-14 aircraft dropped more than 1.3 million pounds of ordnance in support of the war. Prior to returning home, President George W. Bush made his historic landing on the deck of Abraham Lincoln in a S-3 piloted by CVW-14's own VS-35 Blue Wolves. This marked the first time a sitting president landed on a carrier in a fixed-wing aircraft and the first time a United States Navy aircraft radio callsign was changed to Navy One. CVW-14 returned home 6 May 2003 after nearly 10 months on deployment, the longest for a carrier in three decades.

Only one month after returning, CVW-14 transferred to USS John C. Stennis, and on 26 October 2003 returned to sea in preparation for WESTPAC 2004. CVW-14 was the first air wing to integrate into the new Fleet Readiness Training Program (FRTP) cycle and completed a successful Composite Training Unit Exercise, Air Wing Fallon detachment and, ultimately, Joint Task Force Exercise. After only a 14-month turnaround, CVW-14 deployed on board John C. Stennis in support of Northern Edge, RIMPAC 2004 and Joint Air and Sea Exercises during their WESTPAC 2004 deployment. WESTPAC 2004 also marked the final F-14 cruise for a west coast air wing and included the final TARPS mission flown by the F-14 community.

In February 2005, CVW-14 transferred again, this time to USS Ronald Reagan. In January 2006, the CVW-14/Ronald Reagan team departed for her maiden deployment in support of Operation Iraqi Freedom and maritime security operations in the Persian Gulf. CVW-14 squadrons VFA-22, VFA-25, VFA-113, and VFA-115 were the first to deploy with F/A-18 Hornet strike fighters equipped with the Remotely Operated Video Enhanced Receiver (ROVER) system that allows ground forces, such as Joint terminal attack controllers (JTAC), to see what an aircraft or unmanned aerial vehicle (UAV) is seeing in real time by receiving images acquired by the aircraft's sensors on a laptop on the ground via video transfer with little time delay. ROVER greatly improves the JTAC on the ground reconnaissance and target identification which are essential to close air support.

From 19–23 June 2006 the Carrier Strike Group Seven, with the air wing embarked aboard Ronald Reagan, took part in Exercise Valiant Shield 2006, held in the Guam operating area. Carrier Air Wing Fourteen provided a wide variety of capabilities during Valiant Shield 2006. Tactical Electronic Warfare Squadron 139 (VAQ-139) flew Northrop Grumman EA-6B Prowler equipped with state-of-the-art Improved Capability Version III technology. Carrier Airborne Early Warning Squadron 113 (VAW-113) provided command-and-control capability with its E-2C Hawkeye 2000 aircraft. Helicopter Anti-Submarine Squadron 4 (HS-4) was one of four helicopter squadrons that operated 24 SH-60F and SH-60H Seahawk helicopters used to protect the carrier task force against an underwater force consisting of five submarines.

In early 2007, CVW-14 embarked on a surge-deployment to the Pacific Ocean, and on 18 May 2008, the carrier and its strike group departed Naval Air Station North Island for a scheduled deployment to an undisclosed location.

On 28 May 2009, Carrier Air Wing 14 deployed aboard Ronald Reagan to the 7th and 5th Fleet Areas of Responsibility.

One highlight of the 2011 WESTPAC deployment occurred on 18 April 2011 when Captain Kevin "Nix" Mannix made his 1,000th arrested landing when he landed his F/A-18F Super Hornet from Strike Fighter Squadron 154 on the flight deck of Ronald Reagan. Captain Mannix was the deputy commander of Carrier Air Wing 14. Mannix noted the occasion by noting:

"There is nothing but professionals in this line of work. The men and women on the flight deck, the maintainers, I've worked with nothing but absolute professionals."

Mannix's first arrested landing occurred on board the training aircraft carrier Lexington on 6 December 1987.

=== Deactivation ===
Originally, it was planned to deactivate CVW-14 in 2012. However, the U.S. Navy directed Pacific Fleet and Naval Air Forces to stop and reverse the deactivation process for Carrier Air Wing 14 in a memo dated 20 March 2012. Due to budget restrictions, CVW-14 has been in a state of reduced manning since 2013. In 2016, the Navy included the deactivation of one of its ten carrier air wings in its FY17 budget submission. The 2017 National Defense Authorization Act (NDAA), drafted in 2016, authorized the Navy to reduce to 9 the minimum number of CVWs until additional deployable CVNs can fully support a 10th CVW, or 1 October 2025, whichever comes first, at which time the Secretary of the Navy shall maintain a minimum of 10 CVWs. CVW-14 was deactivated effective 31 March 2017.
