= VAW-113 =

Airborne Command & Control Squadron 113
- Active: 20 April 1967 – present
- Country: United States
- Branch: United States Navy
- Type: Airborne Early Warning (VAW)
- Role: Airborne Early Warning; Airborne Battle Management; Command and Control
- Size: approximately 180
- Part of: Carrier Strike Group One; Carrier Air Wing Two
- Garrison/HQ: Naval Air Station Point Mugu
- Nickname: "Black Eagles"
- Engagements: Operation Iraqi Freedom; Operation Enduring Freedom; Operation Prosperity Guardian; Operation Poseidon Archer

Aircraft flown
- Electronic warfare: E-2 Hawkeye

Airborne Command & Control Squadron 113 (VAW-113), known as the "Black Eagles", was established on 20 April 1967 flying the E-2A Hawkeye. The squadron now flies the E-2D Advanced Hawkeye out of Naval Air Station Point Mugu. The squadron deploys aboard the USS Carl Vinson attached to Carrier Air Wing Two.

== Squadron history ==
=== 1960s–1970s ===
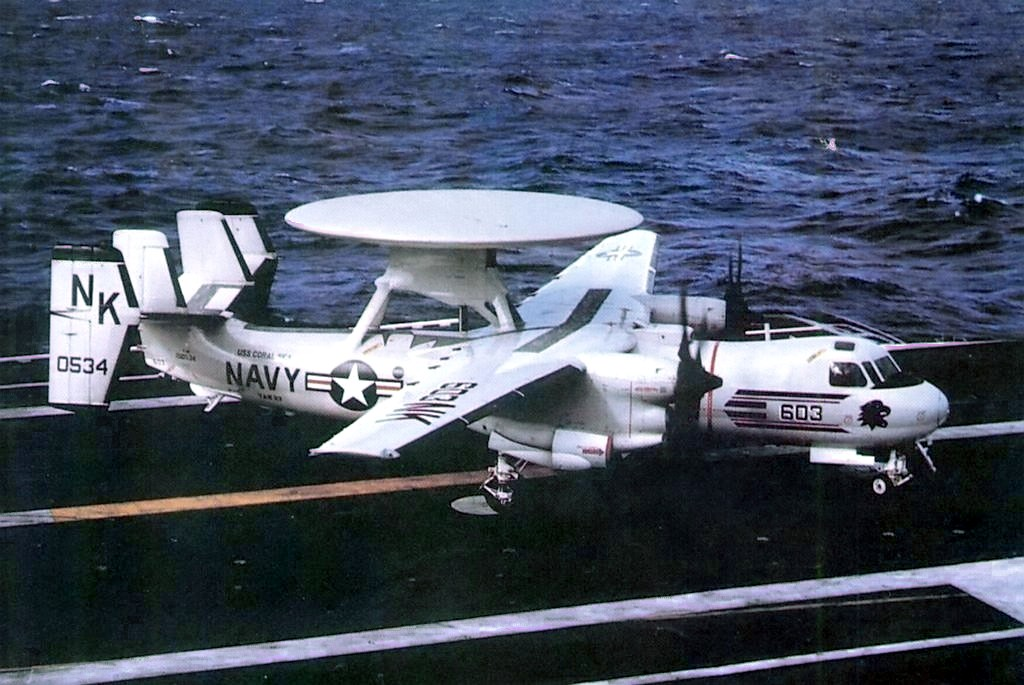
VAW-113 E-2B on USS Coral Sea in 1979

One week after its establishment, VAW-113 deployed to the Western Pacific (WESTPAC) aboard USS Constellation. VAW-113 served in the Vietnam War from 1967 to 1975. The culmination of these efforts occurred in April 1975, when VAW-113 played a vital role in Operation Frequent Wind, the evacuation of American personnel from Saigon.

=== 1980s ===
In 1987, the squadron was recognized for operational excellence in their support of Battle Group DELTA and tanker escort operations in the North Arabian Sea/Gulf of Oman. In December 1988, the squadron set sail again for the North Arabian Sea, monitoring tanker escort operations in support of Operation Earnest Will.

=== 1990s ===
During their WESTPAC 1990 cruise, VAW-113 again deployed to the Gulf of Oman, providing both sea and air cover to Battle Group Delta and allied forces in the Persian Gulf as one of the first units deployed after the Iraqi invasion of Kuwait in August 1990. The squadron spent over three months in the Gulf of Oman in support of Operation Desert Shield prior to their return to San Diego in December 1990.

In May 1992, the squadron and Carrier Air Wing Fourteen (CVW-14) took part in Roving Sands, the largest integrated air defense exercise in the continental United States. This was the first operational employment and successful test of the technology incorporated in the E-2C Group II. Significant improvements in this aircraft over its predecessors were its APS-145 radar, Joint Tactical Information Distribution System (JTIDS), enhanced high-speed processor (EHSP) computer, and Allison T56-A-427 engines.

In August 1994, VAW-113 again deployed to WESTPAC/Persian Gulf, serving as an integral part of CVW-14 and Battle Group Charlie on board USS Carl Vinson. While in the Persian Gulf supporting Operation Southern Watch, VAW-113 aircrews acted as Navy Command and Control liaison officers in Saudi Arabia to Joint Task Force Southwest Asia, U.S. Air Force Boeing E-3A Sentry AWACS, and RC-135 Rivet Joint aircraft. During the first operational deployment of the E-2C Group II "Hawkeye", the squadron provided direct support and demonstration flights, in addition to static displays, for the Japan Air Self-Defense Force, the Republic of Singapore Navy and Air Force and the Royal Australian Air Force.

In 1995 the squadron making a two-month detachment to NS Roosevelt Roads, Puerto Rico supporting Joint Inter-Agency Task Force (JIATF) East's war against drugs. The squadron also became the first E-2C squadron to graduate a Weapons Tactics Instructor from the Marine Air Weapons Tactics Squadron course. Lessons learned helped to integrate the E-2C platform into roles of Direct Air Support Center-Airborne (DASC(A)), Tactical Air Control-Airborne (TAC(A)), and Airborne Battlefield Command, Control and Communications (ABCCC) platform. The squadron also made their second appearance at Roving Sands 1995. Deployed on USS Carl Vinson in August 1995, the squadron participated in the celebration of the 50th anniversary of the end of Worlds War II at Naval Base Pearl Harbor, Hawaii. Fourteen WWII-era aircraft, including three North American B-25 Mitchells, two Vought F4U Corsairs, and a Grumman TBF Avenger were deck launched for the last time.

In May 1996, the squadron made their fifteenth WESTPAC deployment, aboard USS Carl Vinson participating in Operations Desert Strike and Southern Watch in the Persian Gulf. Port visits along the way included Hong Kong, Singapore, and Tasmania.

The squadron again deployed on WESTPAC in June 1998, aboard USS Abraham Lincoln. The squadron's departure marked the end of its basing at NAS Miramar. While on station in the Persian Gulf, VAW-113 flew missions supporting Operation Southern Watch. Port visits were made at Hong Kong, Singapore, Jebel Ali, Perth, Hobart, and Hawaii. At the end of the cruise, the squadron launched from USS Abraham Lincoln, flying into their new home at NAS Point Mugu, California. VAW-113 received the Battle Efficiency "E" award for 1998.

=== 2000s ===
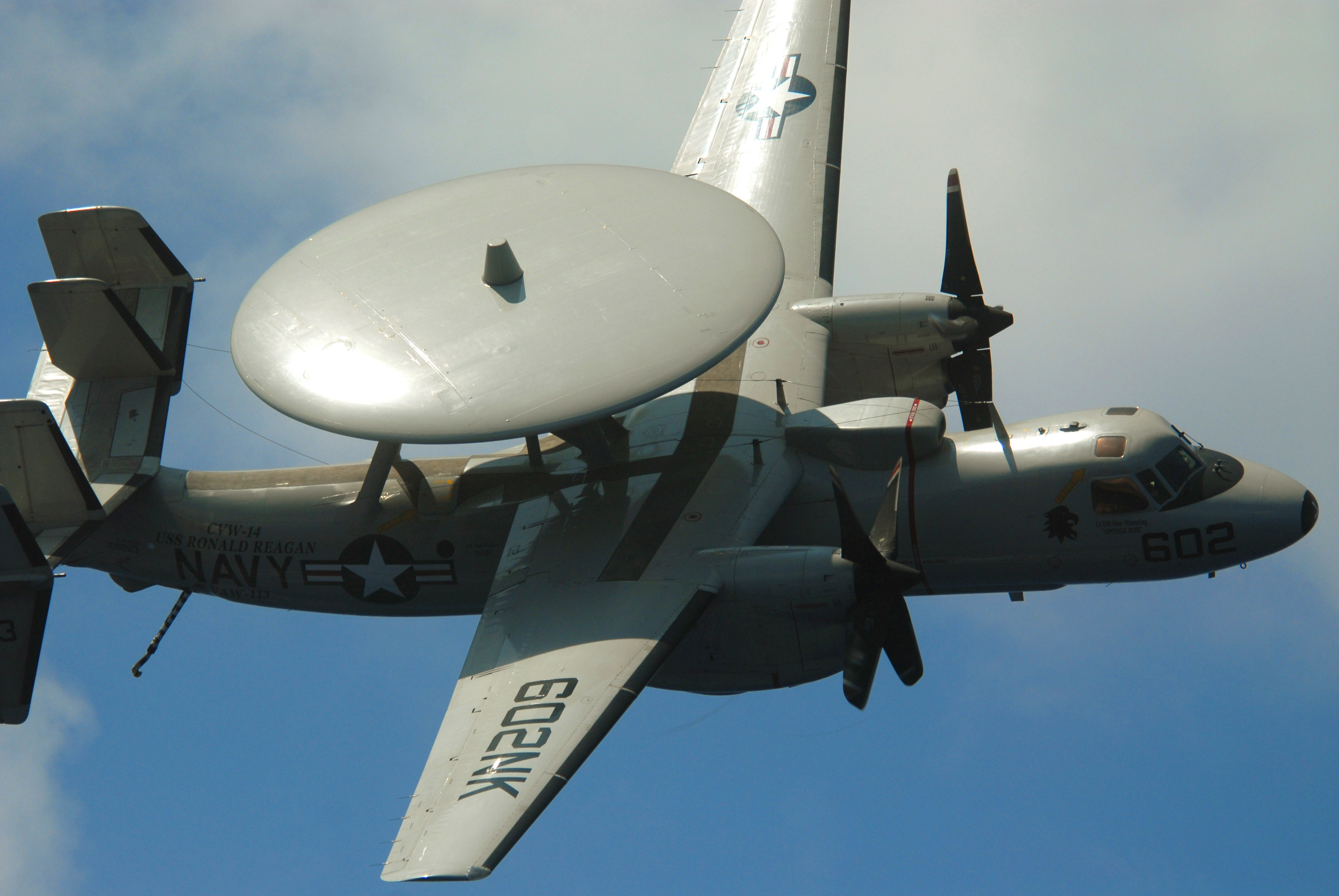
VAW-113 E-2C makes a low pass over USS Ronald Reagan

The squadron began WESTPAC 2000–01 on 20 August 2000, aboard USS Abraham Lincoln. The main focus of the deployment was to conduct Operation Southern Watch (OSW) and to maintain economic sanctions against Iraq. The squadron received their fifth Battle Efficiency "E", the CNO Aviation Safety Award for E-2 squadrons and the Rear Admiral Frank Akers award for Airborne Early Warning excellence as the outstanding E-2 squadron in the entire Navy. In 2003, VAW-113 redeployed to the Persian Gulf to support, for a second time, Operation Southern Watch. On the way home, the ship was turned around in Australia and sent back to the Gulf to participate in the opening phases of Operation Iraqi Freedom. In April, USS Abraham Lincoln group returned home.

In May 2004, VAW-113 deployed on board USS John C. Stennis for airborne command and control in the Gulf of Alaska and to participate in Operation Northern Edge. Operating jointly with Air Force and Navy assets, the Strike Group practiced Maritime Interdiction and Defensive Counter Air missions. In July, the squadron participated in RIMPAC 2004. Following this exercise, USS John C. Stennis joined up with USS Kitty Hawk for a Joint Air and Sea Exercise (JASEX). This second annual joint exercise sprawled across the Pacific from the Sea of Japan to the South China Sea. The Carrier Strike Groups focused on round the clock flight operations and battlespace management. The JASEX had to be halted periodically so each CSG could maneuver away from seven storms and typhoons. In late October 2004, USS John C. Stennis Carrier Strike Group returned to its homeport in San Diego, California.

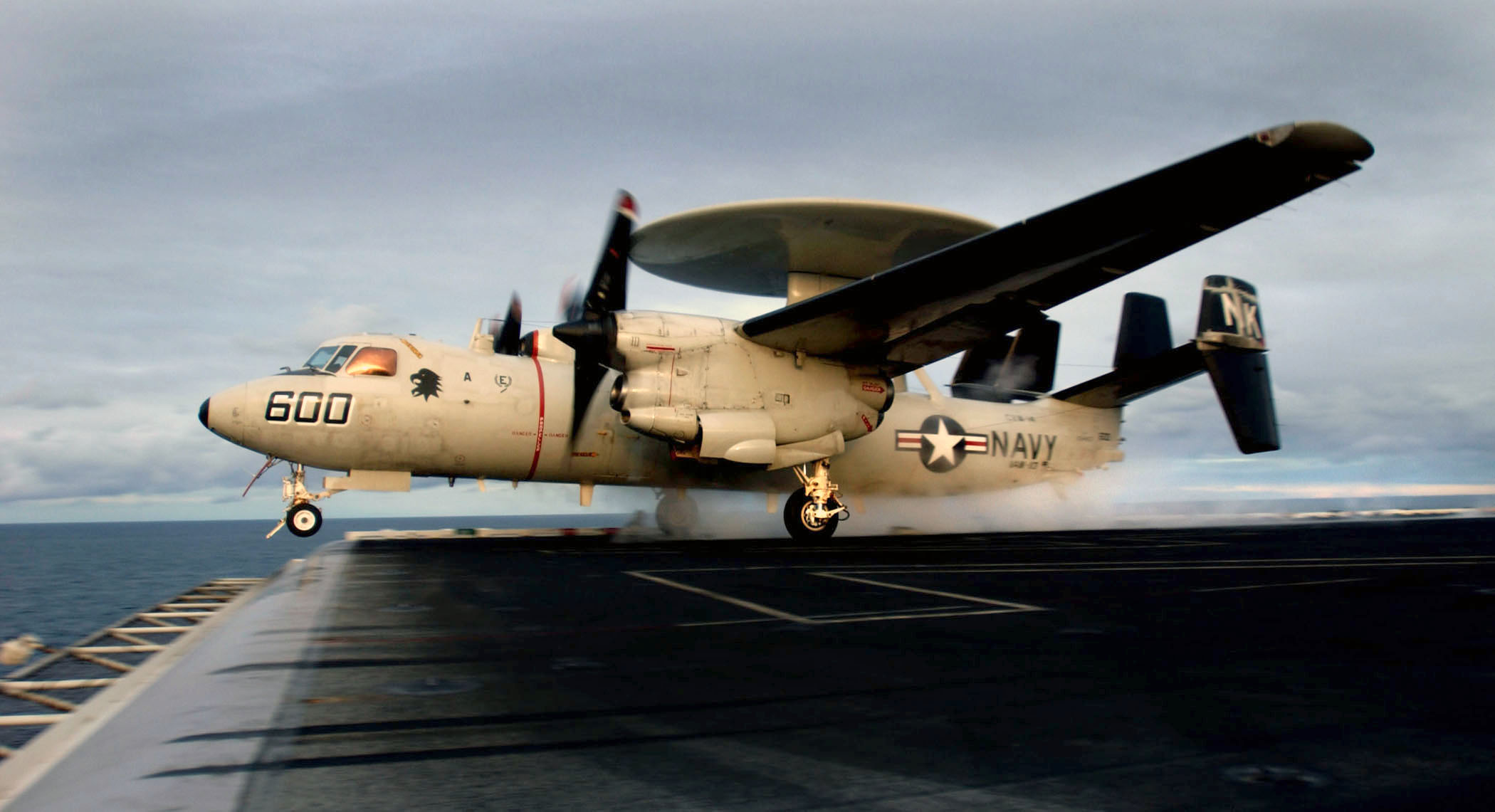
VAW-113 E-2C Hawkeye launches from USS John C. Stennis in 2003

In January 2006, the squadron, along with the CVW-14 and CSG-7 team, joined USS Ronald Reagan on its maiden voyage out of San Diego, California. The Carrier Strike Group transited the Western Pacific to relieve the Carrier Strike Group Two, led by USS Theodore Roosevelt, in the Persian Gulf. In support of Operation Sea Dragon III, the squadron was the first squadron to employ the new ALQ-217 ESM system. In addition, VAW-113 flew over 100 sorties, with a 99% combat sortie completion rate, in support of convoys on the ground during Operation Iraqi Freedom. On the way home, USS Ronald Reagan met up with USS Abraham Lincoln and USS Kitty Hawk Strike Groups for Exercise Valiant Shield.

In January 2007, the squadron again deployed with the CVW-14 and CSG-7 team, on board USS Ronald Reagan on a Surge/Western Pacific (WESTPAC) deployment in which they took part in exercise Foal Eagle. The squadron returned home in April 2007.

In May 2008, the squadron, along with CVW-14 and CSG-7 embarked on board USS Ronald Reagan for a Western Pacific (WESTPAC) deployment. During the WESTPAC, the squadron provided support for Operation Enduring Freedom and following a typhoon, took part in humanitarian efforts for the Philippine Islands. In addition, VAW-113 flew over 400 sorties with a 98% completion rate, won the CVW-14 Golden Wrench award for maintenance excellence and earned another Battle Efficiency "E" award.

In May 2009, the squadron, along with CVW-14 and CSG-7 embarked on board USS Ronald Reagan for the SURGE 09 deployment. The squadron achieved a 99.6% mission completion rate and became back-to-back Battle Efficiency "E" award winners by winning the FY 09 award, as well as another CVW-14 Golden Wrench award for maintenance excellence.

=== 2010s ===
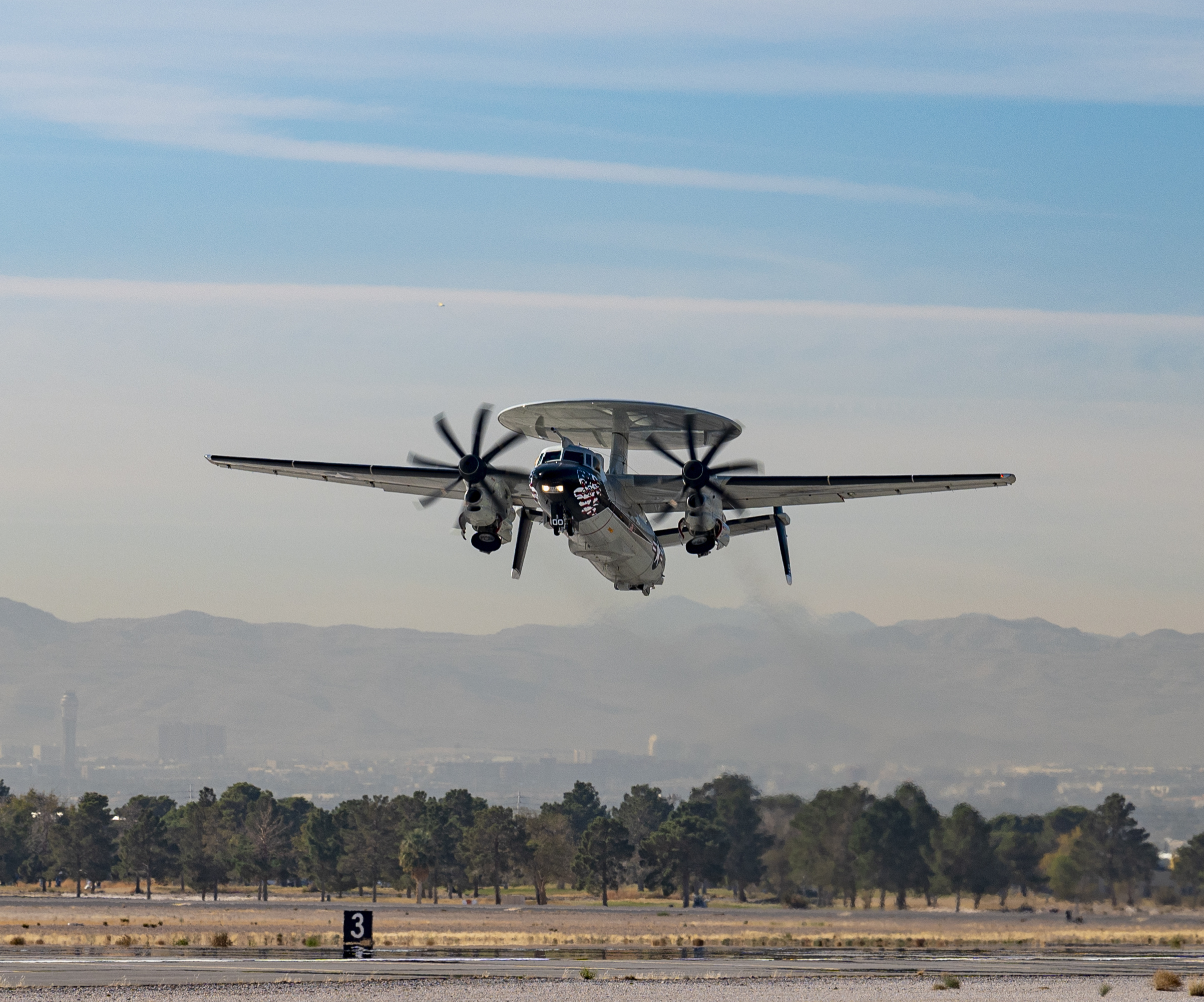
VAW-113 E-2D Hawkeye takes off at Nellis Air Force Base in 2022

In 2010 VAW-113 completed a work-up cycle which included the multinational RIMPAC 2010. In February 2011, the squadron deployed aboard the USS Ronald Reagan in support of Operation New Dawn in Iraq and Operation Enduring Freedom in Afghanistan. In March, during the transit across the Pacific, the squadron was called into action following the devastating 2011 Tōhoku earthquake and tsunami in Japan. The squadron provided the airborne command of the relief effort using their Hawkeye 2000s in Operation Tomodachi. Commander of Naval Air Forces awarded the squadron with their tenth Battle "E" Award for their efforts.

From 2018-2019 CAW-113 prepared to adopt the new E-2D Advanced Hawkeye. Following successful Carrier Qualification on board the USS John C. Stennis in the fall of 2019, VAW-113 flew their E-2Ds back to Point Mugu, CA. Upon their "Safe for Flight" certification, VAW-113 became the first E-2D squadron on the west coast,

=== 2020s ===
In 2020, the squadron was redesignated Airborne Command & Control Squadron from Carrier Airborne Early Warning Squadron.

In 2024, VAW-113 Deployed onboard the USS Carl Vinson with Carrier Air Wing Two for a deployment to the Indo-Pacific region.

== See also ==
- History of the United States Navy
- List of United States Navy aircraft squadrons
