= VAQ-139 =

Electromagnetic Attack Squadron 139
- Active: 1 July 1983
- Country: United States
- Branch: United States Navy
- Type: Electromagnetic Attack
- Role: Electromagnetic Warfare
- Part of: Carrier Air Wing Seventeen
- Garrison/HQ: NAS Whidbey Island
- Mottos: Si Vis Pacem Para Bellum; If you want peace, prepare for war
- Colors: Blue and Grey
- Mascot: Cougar

Commanders
- Current commander: CDR Matthew O'Donnell

Aircraft flown
- Attack: EA-6B Prowler; EA-18G Growler

Electromagnetic Attack Squadron 139 (VAQ-139), also known as the "Cougars", is an EA-18G Growler squadron of the United States Navy. They specialize in electromagnetic attack and are currently stationed at Naval Air Station Whidbey Island, Washington. Part of Carrier Air Wing Seventeen, the Cougars deploy aboard the aircraft carrier USS Nimitz

== Command Leadership ==
Commanding Officer: CDR O'Donnell, Matthew
Executive Officer: CDR Witt, Joshua
Command Master Chief: CMDCM Mingo, Norman

== History ==
=== 1980s ===
VAQ-139 became operational on 1 July 1983 under the command of Commander Richard A. Clark at NAS Whidbey Island, Washington. The squadron participated in numerous exercises during their first year of operation. In 1985, the squadron embarked on their inaugural deployment to the Western Pacific and Indian Ocean on board USS Constellation as part of Carrier Air Wing Fourteen (CVW-14).

In 1986, the squadron won the "triple crown" of the EA-6B Prowler community by winning the 1985 CNO Aviation Safety "S" Award, first place in the 1986 Battle Readiness Competition, and the 1985-86 Commander, Naval Air Force, U.S. Pacific Fleet, Battle "E" Award. In 1987, the squadron earned a second CNO Safety "S", a Navy Unit Commendation and the Battle E for the squadron's second consecutive award. 1988 concluded with the squadron beginning their third Western Pacific / Indian Ocean deployment since their establishment.

After moving to USS Independence in late 1989, the squadron deployed in June 1990 on their fourth Western Pacific / Indian Ocean deployment. They were among the first U.S. forces responding to Iraq's invasion of Kuwait during Operation Desert Shield. The squadron led numerous missions deep into the Persian Gulf and significantly contributed to contingency planning in anticipation of Operation Desert Storm.

=== 1990s ===
In 1993, the squadron moved to USS Carl Vinson and began their long work-up cycle. In February 1994, the squadron went to sea for their fifth Western Pacific / Indian Ocean deployment and were awarded the Prowler Tactical Excellence Award for superior performance throughout 1994.

In May 1996, the squadron earned the coveted "triple crown" for the second time, receiving the Battle "E", CNO Safety S, and Admiral Arthur W. Radford Award for the best Prowler squadron in the U.S. Navy. In 1997, the squadron deployed aboard USS Abraham Lincoln.

The squadron deployed on their seventh Western Pacific deployment in June 1998 in support of Operation Southern Watch and once again in August 2000. The squadron received the COMNAVAIRPAC Battle "E" for excellence in combat for calendar year 2000.

=== 2000s ===
On 23 July 2002, the squadron departed for a scheduled six-month deployment to the Western Pacific/Indian Ocean in support of Operation Enduring Freedom over Afghanistan and Southern Watch over Iraq. In 2002 the squadron received their third "triple crown" in the squadron's history.

On New Year's Day 2003, the USS Abraham Lincoln Carrier Strike Group was turned around and returned to the Persian Gulf for an extended deployment. After another month of participation in Operation Southern Watch, the squadron participated in Operation Iraqi Freedom. The squadron's Prowlers supported strikes deep into Baghdad during the first night of the war, and eventually flew 61 combat missions and fired 17 AGM-88 HARM missiles. Following three weeks of intense combat operations, Abraham Lincoln left the Persian Gulf and arrived home in May 2003 after nearly ten months at sea. The squadron was awarded the Navy Unit Commendation for their efforts on the war.

In May 2004, VAQ-139 and CVW-14 deployed with USS John C. Stennis to the Pacific for the last time with Block 89 aircraft. Upon returning home in November 2004, they were awarded CVW-14's Golden Wrench Award for outstanding aviation maintenance.

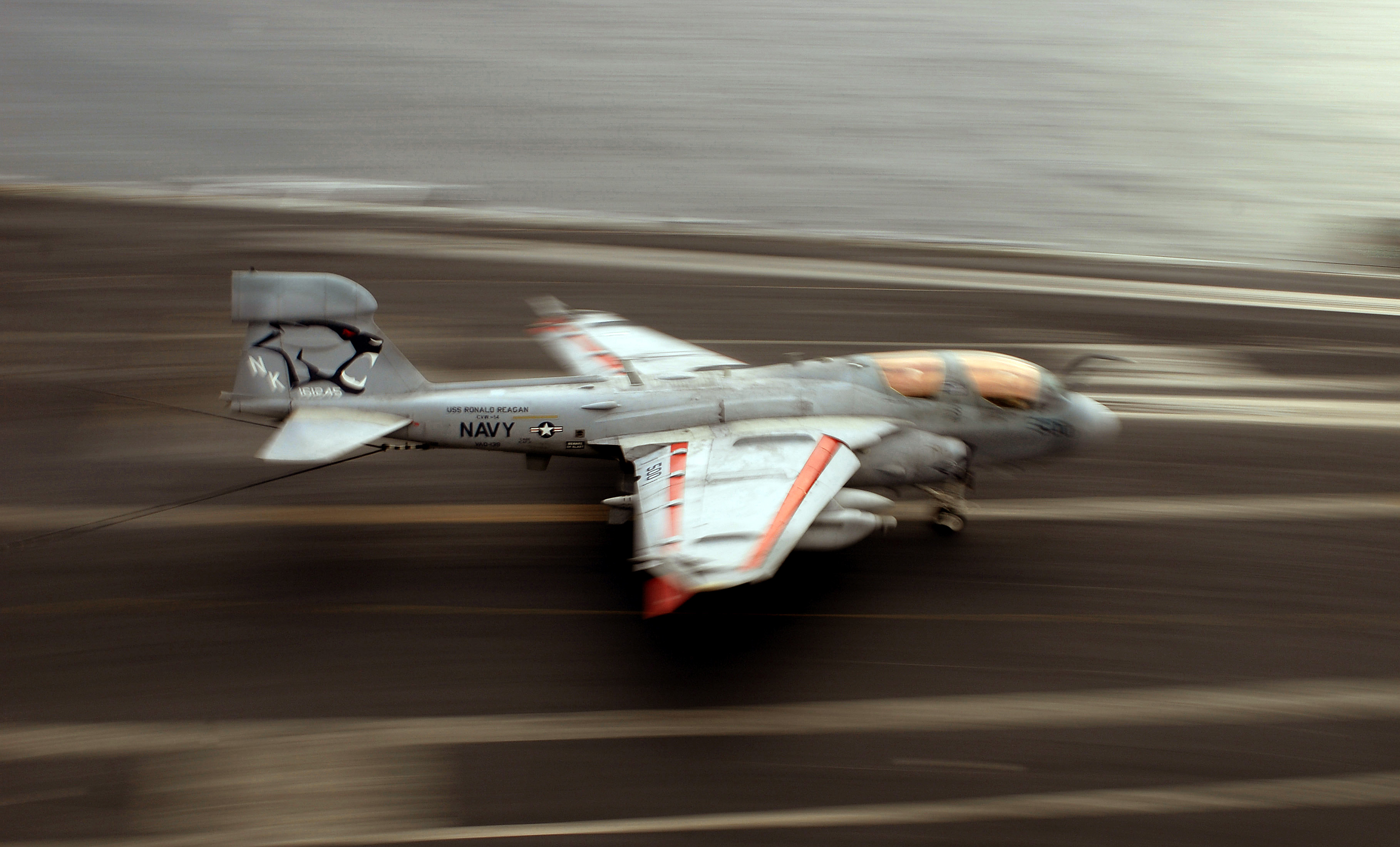
VAQ-139 EA-6B

On 18 March 2005 VAQ-139 accepted the first Improved Capabilities III Prowler. In early February, VAQ-139 put the new systems to the test by becoming the first squadron to use the ICAP III in combat to support United States and Coalition Forces in Iraq during the ongoing efforts in the Iraq War. Flying over 650 sorties and 1,650 combat hours in 3 1/2 months from USS Ronald Reagan and Al Asad Air Base in Iraq.

The squadron returned from deployment and received the 2006 Prowler Squadron of the Year for Tactical Excellence, the 2006 CVW-14's Golden Wrench Award, the Association of Old Crows (AOC) Award for Electronic Warfare Excellence, the Grampaw Pettybone Award for 2006 and CNO Safety "S" for 2005.

In January 2007, VAQ-139 and CVW-14 left a Western Pacific (WESTPAC) Surge Deployment. For a three-month surge cruise, the squadron and USS Ronald Reagan patrolled the seas of the Western Pacific filling in for USS Kitty Hawk while it was in port for scheduled maintenance. Soon after returning from the cruise, the squadron was awarded the Safety "S" for 2006.

In May 2008, the squadron began their next scheduled WESTPAC/IO deployment. They supported survivors of Typhoon Fengshen, which had affected nearly five million people in the Philippines. Following their humanitarian work, they headed to the Northern Arabian Sea to support U.S. and Coalition Forces on the ground in Afghanistan. The squadron was awarded the Battle "E," the CNO Safety "S," and the Humanitarian Service Medal.

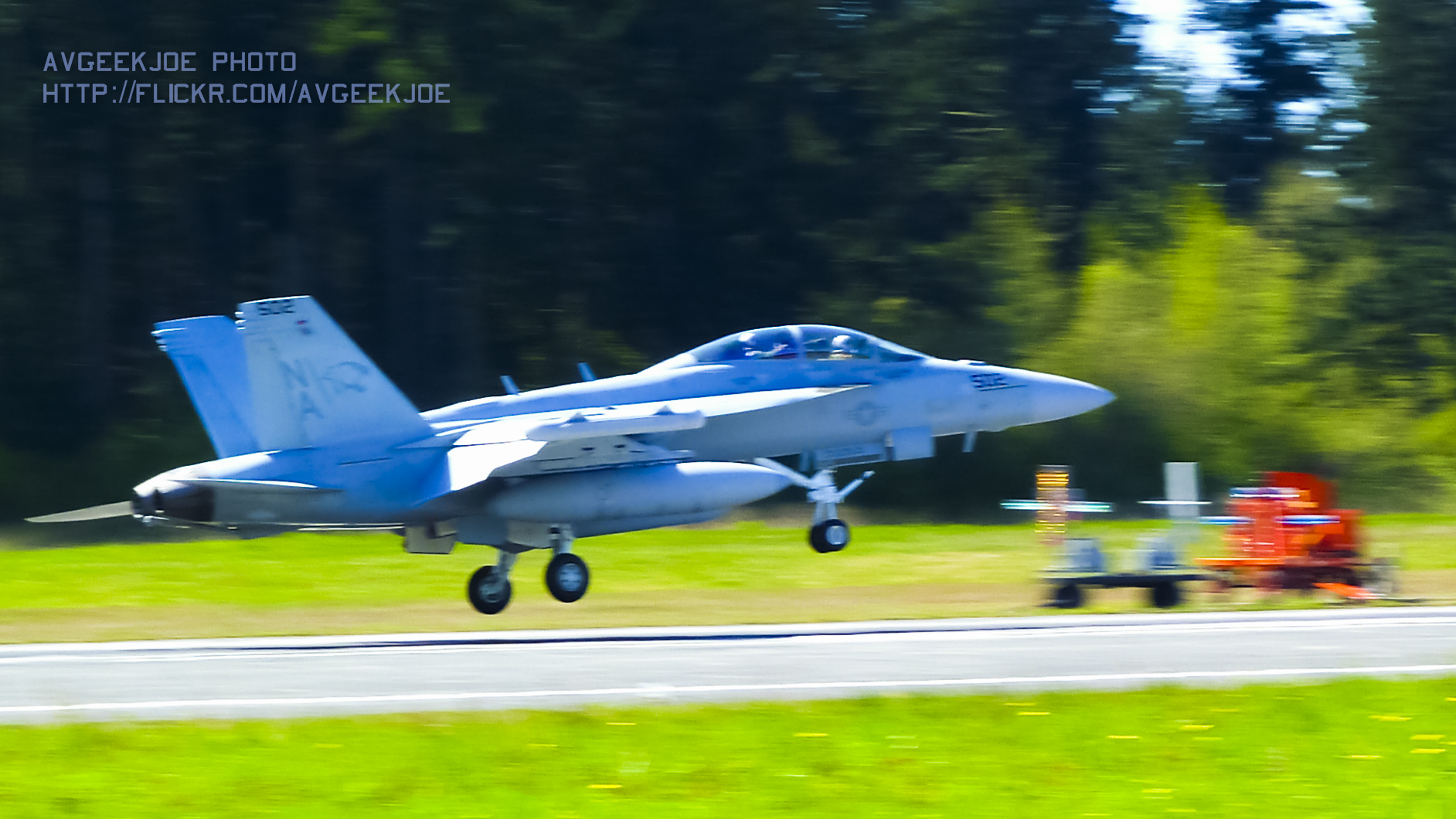
VAQ-139 EA-18G at Naval Outlying Landing Field Coupeville

In May 2009, the squadron left again for a Surge WESTPAC/IO deployment, continuing their support of U.S. and Coalition Forces in operations in Afghanistan. Following their return in October 2009, the squadron became the first to accept the newest version of the Prowler, ICAP III, Block IV.

=== 2010s ===
At the beginning of 2010, the squadron assisted VX-9 in the operational evaluation of the Block IV aircraft, testing various capability improvements to the ICAP III weapon system. In February and March, the squadron participated in Red Flag at Fallon Naval Air Station, Nevada. In March, the Cougars sent two aircraft to Naval Air Station Lemoore to participate in an AGM-88 live-fire exercise with other Air Wing aircraft.

In April the squadron started the work-up cycle in preparation for their upcoming deployment. In July the squadron started their participation in Exercise RIMPAC off the coast of the Hawaiian Islands. They shot two AGM-88s at the decommissioned USS Anchorage. In August they returned home.

In September the squadron attended Naval Strike and Air Warfare Center to sharpen their war fighting skills along with Carrier Air Wing Fourteen. With training complete the squadron returned home to Whidbey Island, to begin preparing for its 2011 Persian Gulf Combat Deployment on board USS Ronald Reagan.

USS Ronald Reagan and Carrier Air Wing Fourteen departed from San Diego, Harbor in February 2011. While on deployment VAQ-139 was informed that it had also received the 2010 Association of the Old Crows Award for Electronic Attack Excellence and the 2010 Admiral Arthur W. Radford Award for Meritorious Operational Achievement by Tactical Electronic Warfare Squadron. While deployed VAQ-139 conducted missions in Operation New Dawn (Iraq) and Operation Enduring Freedom (Afghanistan) providing around the clock Electronic Warfare Support to coalition forces engaged in combat. After this deployment the squadron will be transitioning from the EA-6B Prowler to the EA-18 Growler.

Upon completing the transition, the Cougars began work-ups for their inaugural EA-18G deployment with Carrier Air Wing 17 (CVW-17). During September 2013 VAQ-139 conducted the first successful live fire of the AIM-120 Advanced Medium-Range Air-to-Air Missile (AMRAAM). Following this event, the Cougars flew the combat-loaded Growler aboard the USS Carl Vinson for Tailored Ship's Training Availability (TSTA). After the New Year the Cougars returned home to NAS Whidbey Island.

In the spring of 2014 the Cougars participated in Air Wing Fallon and Composite Training Unit Exercise (COMPTUEX). During these events, VAQ-139 exceeded every standard of tactical excellence in the EA-18G. At the completion of COMPTUEX, VAQ-139 was designated combat-ready and headed home to NAS Whidbey Island to make final preparations for deployment. While deployed on what would be the longest carrier deployment since the Vietnam War, the Cougars supported Operation Inherent Resolve and provided over 75% Airborne Electronic Attack support in theatre. During the deployment, the Cougars were awarded the 2014 CNO Aviation Safety Award, the 2015 Commander Electronic Attack Wing Pacific Fleet (CVWP) Semi-annual Safety "S", the Commander Naval Air Forces (CNAF) Blue "M", and the 2014 U.S. Fleet Forces (USFF) Retention Excellence Award. The Cougars returned home in June 2015. Since returning from deployment, the Cougars maintained a high level of readiness and tactical expertise. During the rest of 2015, the Cougars flew a total of 529.7 flight hours, and participated in the USAF Weapons School's Advanced Integration 15B, an exercise that included a combined 102 sorties and 216.8 flight hours.

During 2016, VAQ-139 participated in five major detachments and several maintenance detachments to support the needs of the fleet. These include two carrier qualification detachments, two to Nellis AFB, NV to participate in exercises with the USAF, and a detachment to NAS Fallon, NV in support of Electronic Warfare Advanced Readiness Program (EWARP) with the Electronic Attack Weapons School. In 2016 the Cougars totaled 1014 sorties, flying 1478.5 mishap free hours, and completing 120 Growler Weapons and Tactics Program (GWTP) events becoming again the recipients of the Navy's Aviation Battle Efficiency Award (Battle "E"), for Pacific Fleet embarked Electronic Attack Squadrons.

The Cougars spent much of 2017 preparing for their upcoming deployment on board USS Theodore Roosevelt as part of Carrier Air Wing 17 (CVW 17). The Cougars successfully Carrier Qualified (CQ) all nine of its pilots on board Theodore Roosevelt in January following a short Field Carrier Landing Practice (FCLP) detachment in NAF El Centro, California. During April and May the Cougars spent five weeks underway participating in Tailored Ship's Training Availability (TSTA) where aircrew gained valuable experience operating both underway and integrating with the Air Wing. This experience proved vital in enabling the Cougar's success during four weeks of Air Wing Fallon in NAS Fallon, NV during June. In August the Cougars completed the capstone event of the Fleet Readiness Training Program (FRTP) cycle, Composite Training Unit Exercise (COMPTUEX) reaching full readiness for deployment. In October 2017 the Cougars embarked upon Theodore Roosevelt to begin their deployment. In November the Cougars participated in Three Carrier Strike Force Exercise in the Sea of Japan with USS Nimitz and USS Ronald Reagan followed by stability and presence operations in the South China Sea. By the end of November the Cougars entered the Fifth Fleet Area of Operations and began flying combat sorties in support of Operations Inherent Resolve (OIR) and Freedom's Sentinel (OFS). In total for 2017, the Cougars flew 2,280.1 hours and completed 84 GWTP events earning multiple awards including the 2017 Electronic Attack Maintenance Squadron of the Year Golden Wrench Award, FRTP work-up cycle CVW-17 Golden Wrench Award, 2017 Chief of Naval Operations Aviation Safety Award, and Navy's Aviation Battle Efficiency Award (Battle "E").

In April 2019, the Cougars were awarded the Navy's Aviation Battle Efficiency Award (Battle "E") for the third consecutive year (2016, 2017, and 2018).

== See also ==
- History of the United States Navy
- List of United States Navy aircraft squadrons
