= VFA-22 =

Strike Fighter Squadron 22
- Active: 27 July 1948 – present
- Country: United States
- Branch: United States Navy
- Type: Fighter/Attack
- Role: Close air support Air interdiction Aerial reconnaissance
- Part of: Carrier Air Wing Seventeen
- Garrison/HQ: NAS Lemoore
- Nickname: Fighting Redcocks
- Motto: "You Can't Beat A Redcock" (YCBAR)
- Mascot: Rhode Island Red Rooster
- Engagements: Korean War; Vietnam War; Operation Praying Mantis; Operation Classic Resolve; Operation Southern Watch; Operation Continue Hope; Operation Desert Fox; Operation Enduring Freedom; Operation Inherent Resolve

Commanders
- Commanding Officer: CDR Johnathan "Skirmish" Sheater
- Executive Officer: CDR Bradley "DUG" Williams
- Command Master Chief: CMDCM. Jonathan Arroyave

Aircraft flown
- Fighter: F8F Bearcat; F4U Corsair; F9F Panther; F9F Cougar; FJ-4 Fury; A-4 Skyhawk; A-7 Corsair II; F/A-18C Hornet; F/A-18E Super Hornet; F/A-18F Super Hornet

VFA-22, Strike Fighter Squadron 22, also known as the "Fighting Redcocks", are a United States Navy F/A-18F Super Hornet fighter squadron stationed at Naval Air Station Lemoore, California. Their tail code is NA and their radio callsign is "Beef".

== History ==
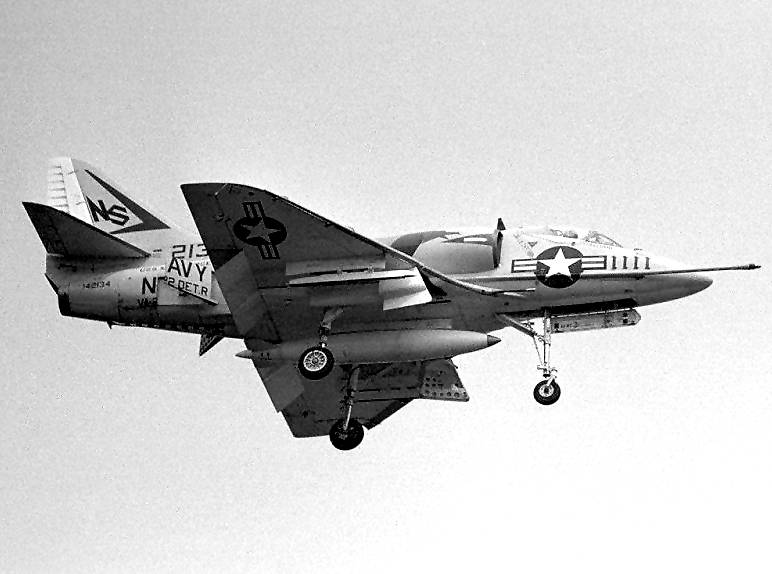
A VA-22 Det. R A-4B from the USS Kearsarge in 1963

Strike Fighter Squadron 22 was originally established as Fighter Squadron 63 (VF-63) at Naval Air Station Norfolk, Virginia on 28 July 1948, the squadron was re-designated as Attack Squadron 63 (VA-63) in March 1956, redesignated as Attack Squadron 22 (VA-22) on 1 July 1959 and redesignated Strike Fighter Squadron 22 (VFA-22) on 4 May 1990.

The squadron originally flew the F8F Bearcat, then the F4U Corsair, F9F Panther, F9 Cougar, FJ-4 Fury, A-4 Skyhawk, A-7 Corsair II, and the F/A-18C Hornet. Today, the 220 enlisted men and women and 40 officers of VFA-22 are based at NAS Lemoore, California, and have completed the transition from the single seat F/A-18E Super Hornet to the twin-seat F/A-18F Super Hornet.

Over the years, the squadron completed three combat deployments during the Korean War and six combat deployments during the Vietnam War, where it participated in Operation Pocket Money.

=== 1980s ===
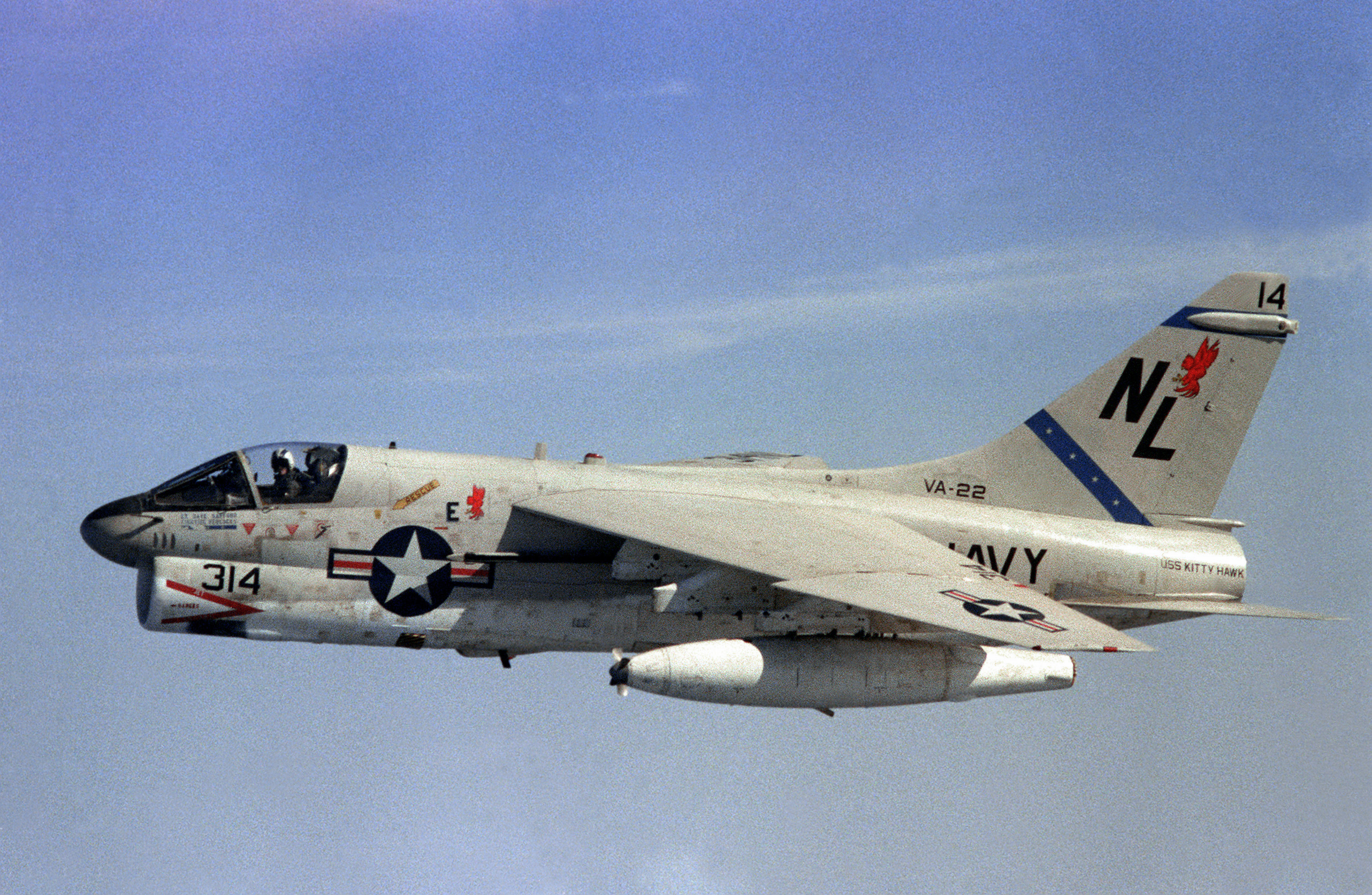
A-7E of VA-22 stationed aboard USS Kitty Hawk in 1981

In the late 1970s and early 1980s, VA-22 embarked with Carrier Air Wing 15 aboard USS Kitty Hawk and deployed to the Western Pacific and Indian Ocean. The Squadron won back to back Battle E awards during the 80 & 81 competitive cycles and was the co-west coast launch squadron for FLIR mounted A7Es. While deployed aboard USS Enterprise in April 1988, while in the Persian Gulf, VA-22 aircraft participated in sinking the Iranian frigate Sahand which fired missiles at two American A-6 Intruders. In December 1989, the squadron participated in Operation Classic Resolve, providing support for the Philippine government during a coup attempt.

=== 1990s ===
In 1993, the squadron deployed aboard USS Abraham Lincoln to the Persian Gulf and participated in Operation Southern Watch, enforcing the United Nations Southern no-fly zone over Iraq. Before returning home from deployment, the squadron diverted to the coast of Somalia and provided air support during Operation Continue Hope.

In December 1998, VFA-22, off of the Carl Vinson, led Carrier Air Wing 11's only air strike of Operation Desert Fox.

=== 2000s ===
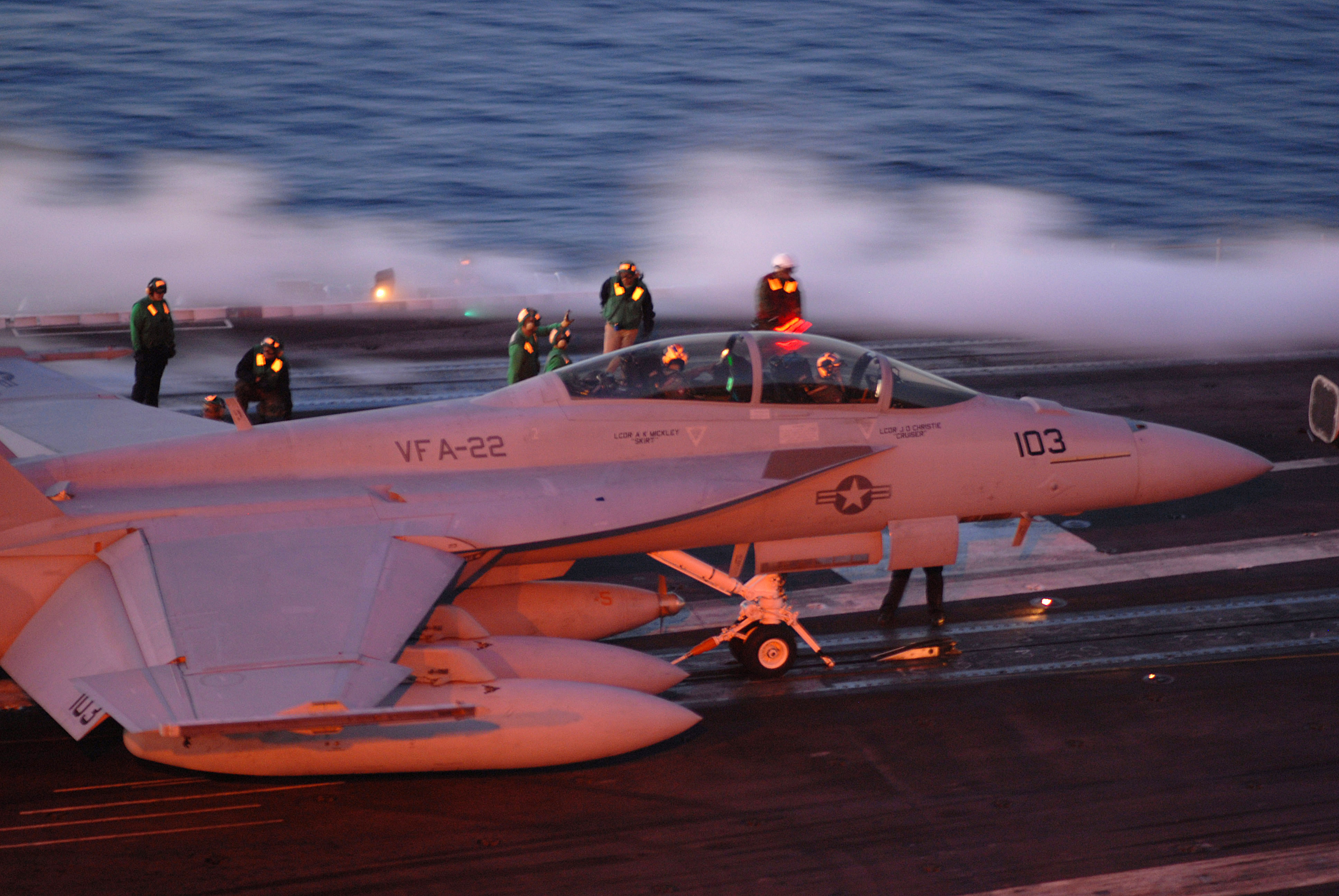
A VFA-22 F/A-18F prepares to launch from USS Ronald Reagan in 2007

In October 2001, VFA-22 operating from USS Carl Vinson performed strikes against Taliban and Al Qaeda forces in Afghanistan in support of Operation Enduring Freedom. In 2003, VFA-22 deployed with Carrier Air Wing 9 on board Carl Vinson on an extended eight month Western Pacific deployment in support of the Global War on Terrorism. In July 2004, VFA-22 transitioned to F/A-18E Super Hornets, and in January, 2006, deployed with Carrier Air Wing 14 on board USS Ronald Reagan for six months in support of the Global War on Terrorism.

In early 2007, VFA-22, made a surge deployment with Carrier Air Wing 14 and USS Ronald Reagan to the Pacific Ocean with a mixed unit of F/A-18E and F/A-18F as the unit was in the middle of transitioning aircraft again, this time from the single seat F/A-18E to the two seat F/A-18F. By the end of 2007, VFA-22 had transitioned to the F/A-18F Super Hornet, marking the first time in the squadron's history that it had operated twin-seat tactical aircraft and integrated Naval Flight Officers with the Naval Aviators in its officer complement.

On 28 May 2009, VFA-22 and Carrier Air Wing 14 deployed with USS Ronald Reagan on a deployment to the 7th and 5th Fleet Areas of Responsibility.

=== 2010s ===
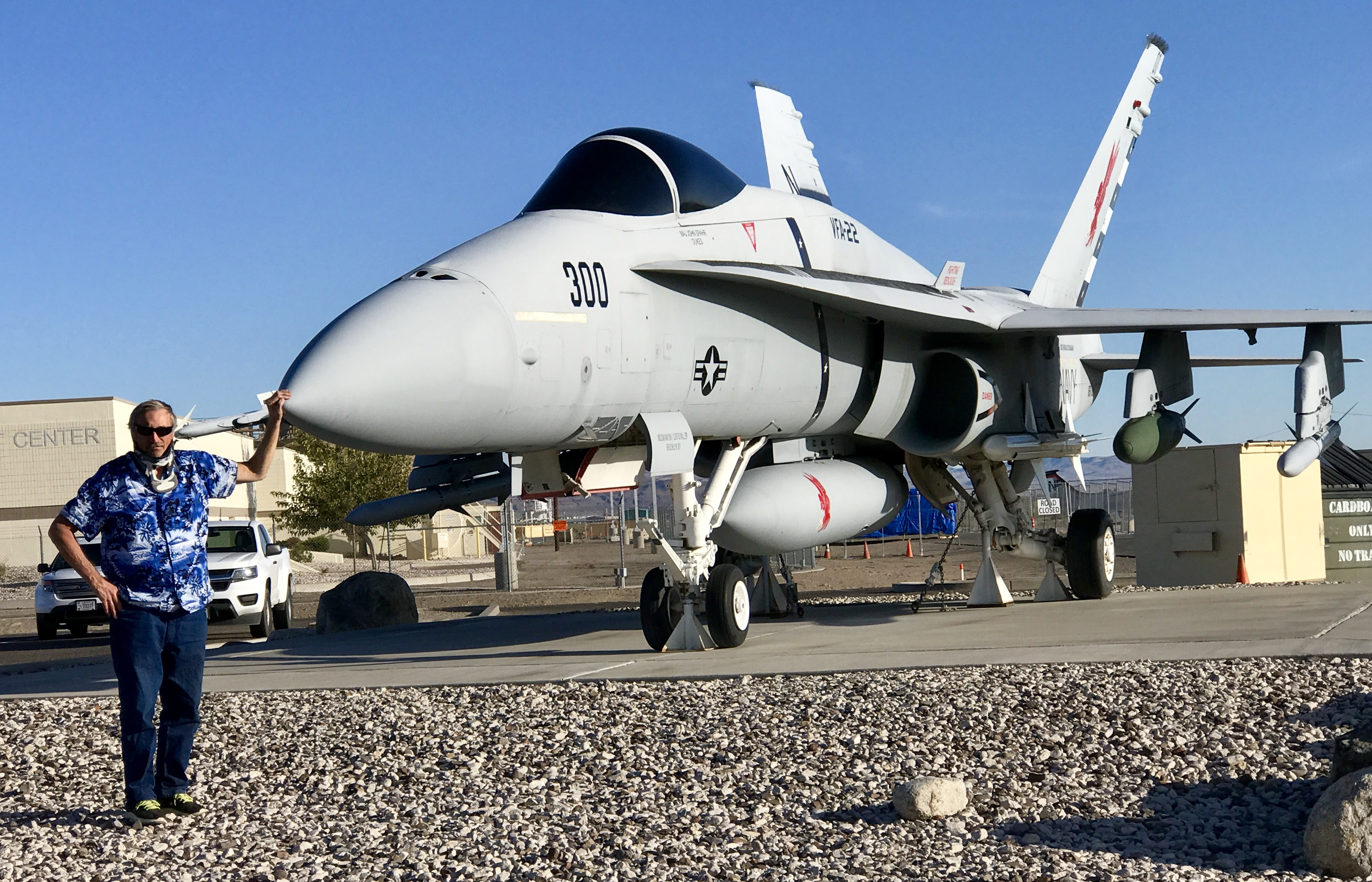
VFA-22 F/A-18 at NAS Fallon Nevada USA on the grounds of the Naval Air Station Fallon Air Park (Museum), home of the TOPGUN Navy Fighter Weapons School.

In 2010, The squadron re-located from Carrier Air Wing Fourteen to Carrier Air Wing Seventeen sporting the CVW-17 "AA" tailcode, and are now attached to USS NIMITZ.

=== 2020s ===
In 2025, VFA-22 along with Carrier Air Wing 17 deployed on board the USS Nimitz for the carrier's final deployment.

In October 2025, an F/A-18F from VFA-22 crashed in the South China Sea along with an MH-60R Seahawk assigned to HSM-73. All crew members involved in the incident were safely recovered by a search and rescue team.

== See also ==
- History of the United States Navy
- List of inactive United States Navy aircraft squadrons
- List of United States Navy aircraft squadrons
