= USS Coral Sea =

Three ships of the United States Navy have been named USS Coral Sea, commemorating the Battle of the Coral Sea during World War II. All three were aircraft carriers. Of the three vessels, only one retained the name through its career.

- USS Coral Sea (CVE-57) was an escort aircraft carrier named Alikula Bay during construction, renamed Coral Sea just before launching in 1943, and then renamed to Anzio a year later. It was finally decommissioned in 1946.
- USS Franklin D. Roosevelt (CV-42) was originally christened USS Coral Sea, but was renamed nine days after being launched in 1945. It was decommissioned in 1977. Its sister ship (below) was under construction and inherited the Coral Sea name.
- USS Coral Sea (CV-43) was an aircraft carrier in service from 1946 to 1990, including nearly a decade of action in the Vietnam War.
