= Composite Training Unit Exercise =

US Navy rehearsal

COMPTUEX, or Composite Training Unit Exercise, is a rehearsal each US Navy Carrier Strike Group performs before departing for deployment. Each ship and aircraft in the battle group trains in its specialty; COMPTUEX brings ships together to project force as a battle group. COMPTUEX is an intermediate-level battle group exercise designed to forge together the battle group and its components into a fully functional fighting team. COMPTUEX is a critical part in the pre-deployment training cycle, and a prerequisite for the battle group's Joint Task Force Exercise.

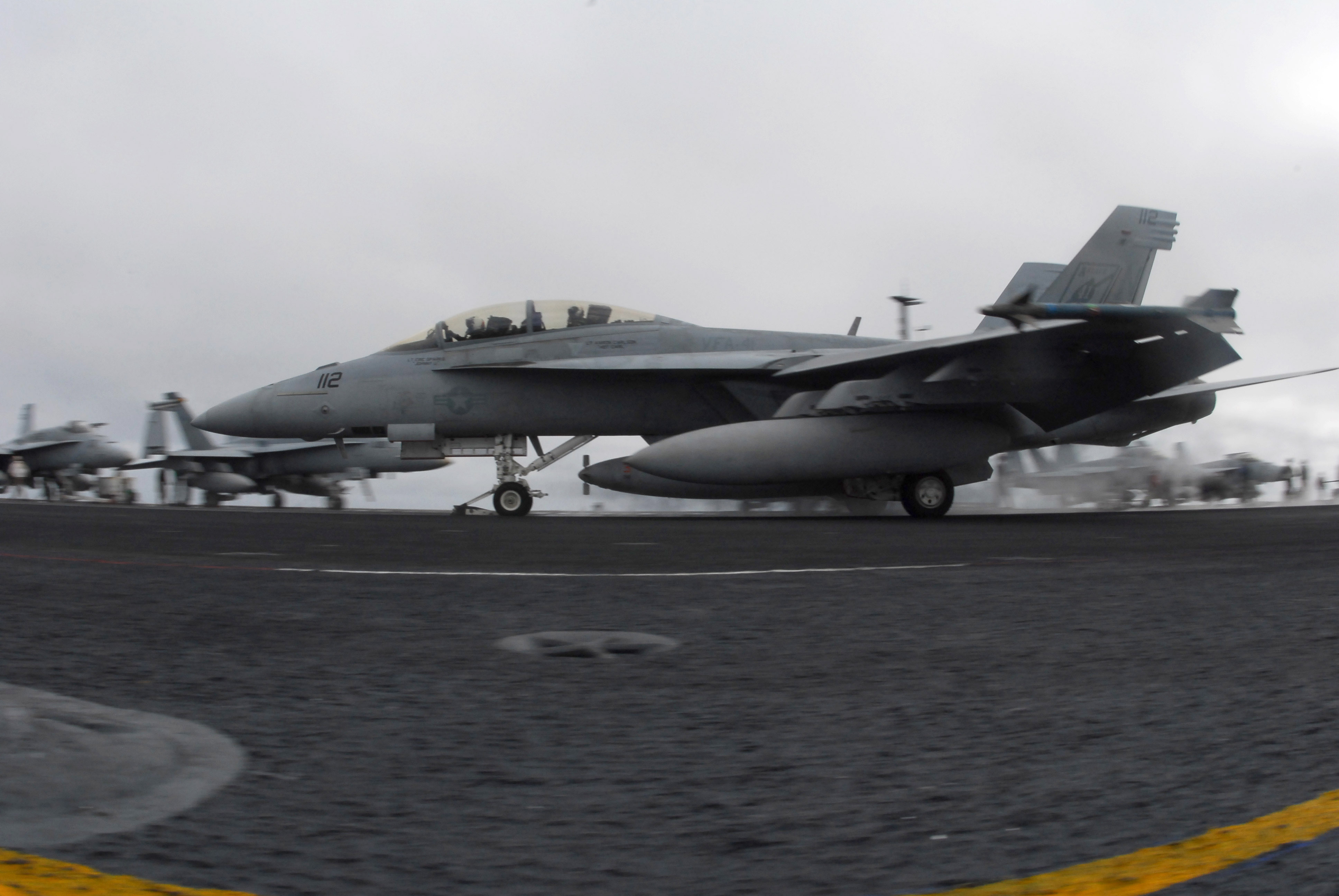
An F/A-18F Super Hornet from VFA-41 deployed with USS Nimitz (CVN-68) during an COMPTUEX in late 2006 off the coast of Southern California.

COMPTUEX is normally conducted during a two to three week period, six to eight weeks before deployment. Successful completion of COMPTUEX certifies the carrier and its air wing as qualified for open ocean operations. COMPTUEX consists of an 18-day schedule of event driven exercise which then follows with a three-day Final Battle Problem. It is conducted and directed by the training carrier group commander and the focus is to bring together the carrier and its air wing as a working team that can operate in a combat environment, as well as integrating with other assets of the battle group.
