= Helicopter 66 =

Individual United States Navy helicopter flown in support of NASA

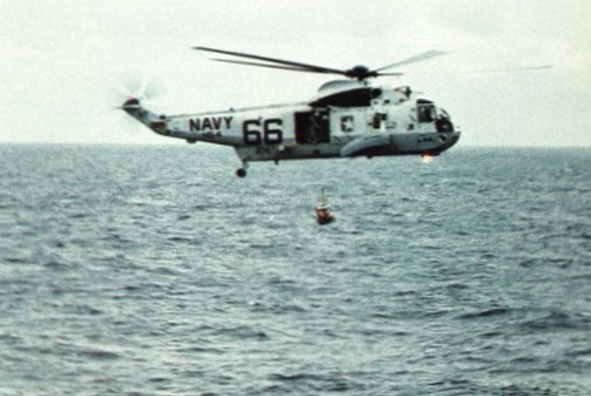
- Helicopter 66 pictured in 1969

General information
- Other names: "Old 66", Helicopter 740
- Type: Helicopter
- Manufacturer: Sikorsky Aircraft
- Owners: U.S. Navy
- Serial: BuNo 152711
- Total hours: 3,245.2

History
- In service: 1968–1975
- Last flight: June 4, 1975
- Fate: Crashed and sank in the Pacific Ocean

Helicopter 66 was a United States Navy Sikorsky Sea King helicopter used during the late 1960s for the water recovery of astronauts during five missions of the Apollo program. It has been called "one of the most famous, or at least most iconic, helicopters in history", was the subject of a 1969 song by Manuela, and was made into a die-cast model by Dinky Toys. In addition to its work in support of NASA, Helicopter 66 also transported the Shah of Iran during his 1973 visit to the aircraft carrier USS Kitty Hawk.

Helicopter 66 was delivered to the U.S. Navy in 1967 and formed part of the inventory of U.S. Navy Helicopter Anti-Submarine Squadron Four for the duration of its active life. Among its pilots during this period was Donald S. Jones, who would go on to command the United States Third Fleet. Later re-numbered Helicopter 740, the aircraft crashed in the Pacific Ocean in 1975 during a training exercise. At the time of its crash, it had logged more than 3,200 hours of service.

== Design ==
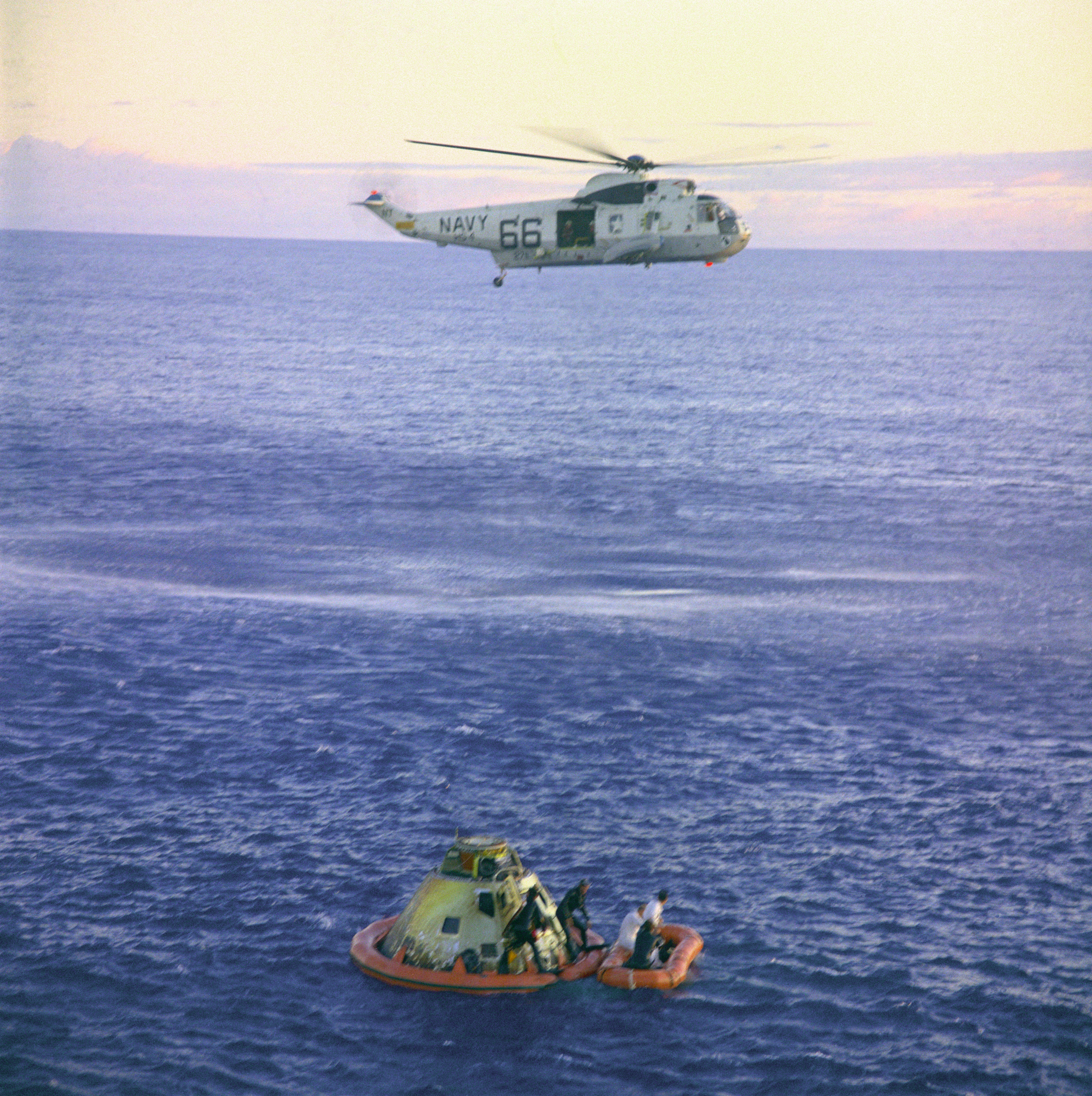
Helicopter 66 pictured during the Apollo 10 recovery in 1969

Helicopter 66 was a Sikorsky Sea King SH-3D. The SH-3D model Sea Kings were designed for anti-submarine warfare (ASW) and were typically configured to carry a crew of four and up to three passengers. Powered by two General Electric T58-GE-10 turboshaft engines producing up to 1,400 horsepower (1,000 kW) each, SH-3Ds had a maximum airspeed of 120 knots (220 km/h; 140 mph) and a mission endurance averaging 4.5 hours. They had a maximum allowable weight of 20,500 pounds (9,300 kg) with the ability to carry an external payload of up to 6,000 pounds (2,700 kg).

During ASW missions, the Sea King SH-3D was typically armed with MK-46/44 torpedoes.

== History ==
=== Early history and Apollo missions ===
Helicopter 66 was delivered to the U.S. Navy on March 4, 1967, and, in 1968, was added to the inventory of U.S. Navy Helicopter Anti-Submarine Squadron Four (HS-4). Its original tail number was NT-66/2711.

Activated on June 30, 1952, Squadron Four—"the Black Knights"—was the first anti-submarine warfare helicopter squadron of the U.S. Navy to deploy aboard an aircraft carrier when, in 1953, it operated from USS Rendova. It began using the Sea King SH-3D in 1968, transitioning from the SH-3A model. That year, the squadron was assigned to Carrier Anti-Submarine Air Group 59 and deployed aboard USS Yorktown to the Sea of Japan in response to the capture of USS Pueblo by the Korean People's Navy. Later that year, Yorktown—and Squadron Four—was tasked to support the National Aeronautics and Space Administration (NASA) in the oceanic recovery of returning astronauts. (Note: Early U.S. crewed spaceflights used water landings during return to Earth due to the minimum additional technology needed to outfit the spacecraft. The command capsule required only parachutes to slow its descent sufficiently for a survivable landing on a "soft" surface like water, instead of the retrorockets that would be required for a landing on a "hard" surface like land.)

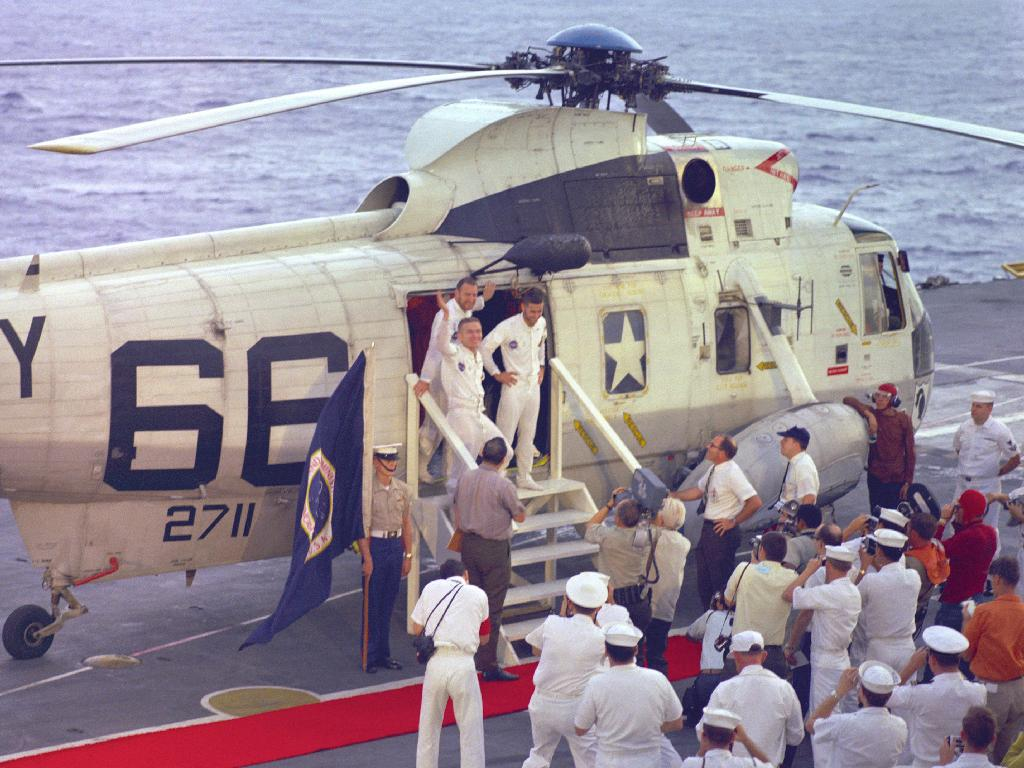
The Apollo 8 crew, Frank Borman, Jim Lovell, and William Anders, disembark Helicopter 66 aboard USS Yorktown following their return to Earth in 1968.

During the Apollo 8, Apollo 10, and Apollo 11 missions, Helicopter 66 was the primary recovery vehicle which hoisted returning astronauts from the spacecraft command modules. As a result, it was featured prominently in television news coverage and still photography, achieving—in the words of space historian Dwayne A. Day—the status of "one of the most famous, or at least most iconic, helicopters in history". Commander Donald S. Jones, who would later command the United States Third Fleet, piloted Helicopter 66 during its inaugural astronaut recovery mission following Apollo 8, and again during the Apollo 11 recovery of command module Columbia.

Following the Apollo 11 mission, the Navy switched to a three-digit designation system and Helicopter 66 was retagged Helicopter 740. Recognizing the fame Helicopter 66 had achieved, the Navy began the practice of repainting Helicopter 740 as Helicopter 66 for the later recovery missions in which it participated, Apollo 12 and Apollo 13, painting it back as Helicopter 740 at the conclusion of each mission. During the period of its use for astronaut recovery, Helicopter 66 bore victory markings on its fuselage showing a space capsule silhouette, with one being added for each recovery in which it participated. For the recovery of the Apollo 11 astronauts, the underside of the fuselage was emblazoned with the words "Hail, Columbia". (Note: The name of the Apollo 11 command capsule was "Columbia" and President of the United States Richard Nixon, who was personally embarked aboard USS Hornet for the recovery, had ordered the Band of the COMNAVAIRPAC to perform "Columbia, the Gem of the Ocean" during the recovery.)

==== List of Helicopter 66 Apollo recovery flights ====
Mission	Flight date	Base ship	Pilot	Reference
Apollo 8	December 27, 1968	USS Yorktown	Donald S. Jones	
Apollo 10	May 26, 1969	USS Princeton	Chuck B. Smiley	
Apollo 11	July 24, 1969	USS Hornet	Donald S. Jones	
Apollo 12	November 24, 1969	USS Hornet	Warren E. Aut	
Apollo 13	April 17, 1970	USS Iwo Jima	Chuck B. Smiley	

=== Later history and crash ===
From 1970 to 1972 Helicopter Squadron Four and Helicopter 66 were embarked aboard USS Ticonderoga CVS-14, and by 1973 Helicopter Squadron Four, and Helicopter 66 with it, were embarked aboard USS Kitty Hawk. That year, Helicopter 66 transported the Shah of Iran, Mohammad Reza Pahlavi, to Kitty Hawk for a shipboard visit while it transited the Indian Ocean.

At 7:00 p.m. on June 4, 1975, Helicopter 66, renumbered as '740', departed Naval Outlying Landing Field Imperial Beach near San Diego, California, en route to the U.S. Navy's Helo Offshore Training Area to conduct a regularly scheduled, three-hour nighttime anti-submarine training exercise. During the operation, in which it was carrying a full complement of four crew, the helicopter crashed. Though the crew was rescued by the U.S. Coast Guard, pilot Leo Rolek was critically injured and later died of the wounds he sustained in the crash. The exact cause of the downing of Helicopter 66 is unknown; as of 2017 the U.S. Navy incident report remains largely classified. The broken fuselage of the helicopter later sank in 800 fathoms (1,500 m) of water. At the time of its crash, Helicopter 66 had flown 3,245.2 flight hours since being brought into service, and 183.6 hours since its last overhaul.

The submerged helicopter remains the property of the U.S. Navy, and a 2004 effort by private interests to recover it for preservation was not realized.

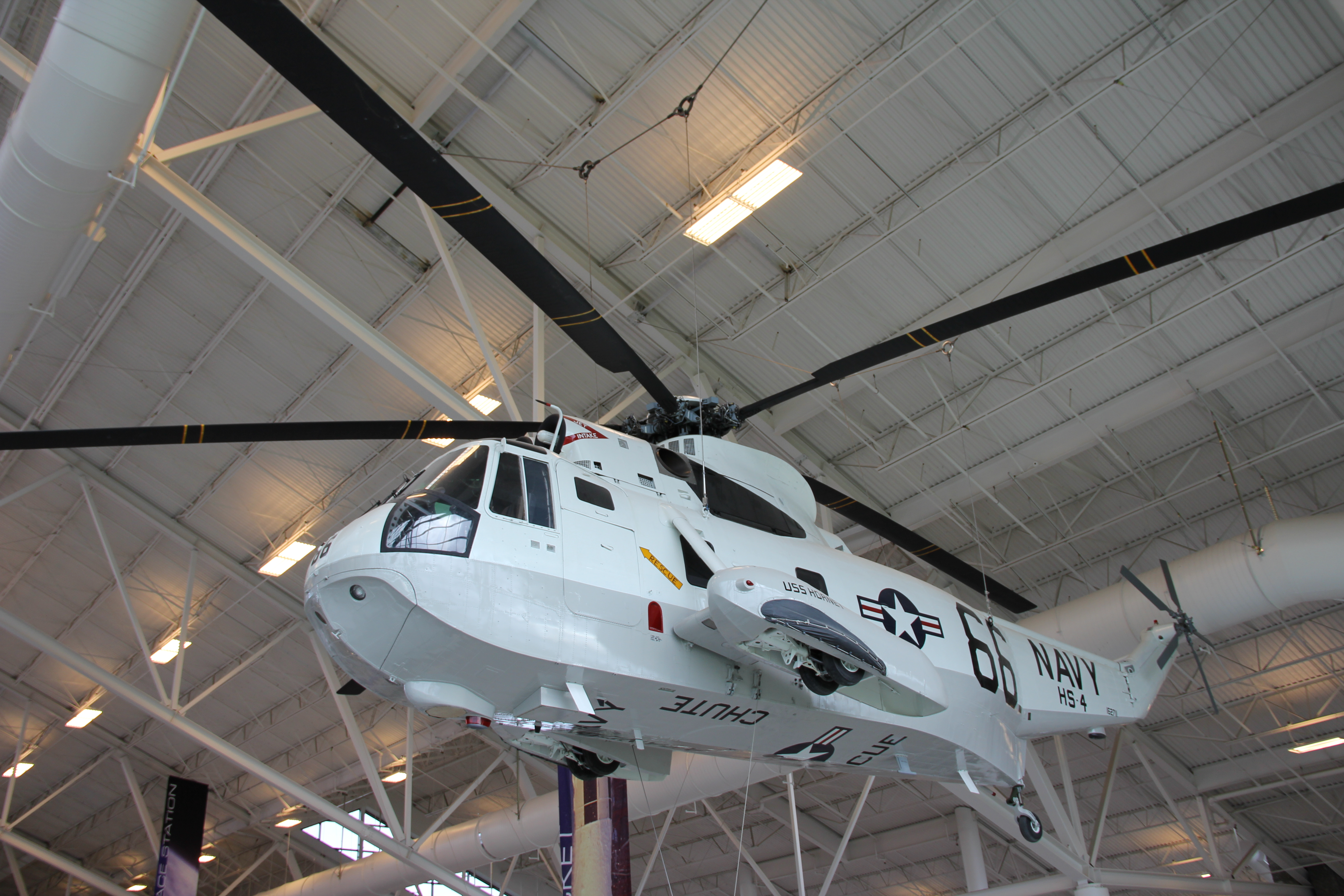
A Sikorsky Sea King painted in Helicopter 66 livery and owned by the National Museum of Naval Aviation, on display at the Evergreen Aviation & Space Museum in 2011

== Legacy ==
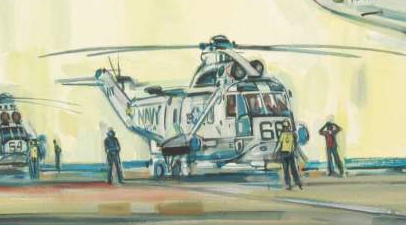
Portion of the 1969 painting Recovery Helicopter 66, by Tom O'Hara

A painting of Helicopter 66 was commissioned in 1969 from artist Tom O'Hara as part of a NASA art initiative. It was subsequently placed in the custody of the National Air and Space Museum.

In September 1969 German singer Manuela released a single titled "Helicopter U.S. Navy 66" which features the sound of helicopter rotors. The song was covered the next year by the Belgian pop singer Samantha, and was credited with helping launch her career. In a 2007 interview, the popularity of "Helicopter U.S. Navy 66" as a closing song at dance clubs in 1970s Belgium was cited by the Belgian Schlager vocalist Laura Lynn as the inspiration for her hit "Goud".

During the early 1970s Dinky Toys released a die-cast model of a Sea King helicopter in Helicopter 66 livery. The model included a working winch which could lift a plastic space capsule toy.

Replicas of Helicopter 66 are on display at the Evergreen Aviation & Space Museum in Oregon, the USS Midway Museum in San Diego, and the USS Hornet Museum in Alameda, California. The helicopter at the USS Hornet Museum is a retired Navy Sikorsky Sea King that was used in filming the 1995 motion picture Apollo 13.

== See also ==
- 57-1419
- List of individual aircraft
- Splashdown
