= List of individual aircraft =

This is a list of individual aircraft which are notable in their own right.

Name or designation	Manufacturer / Type	Role	Owner / Operator	Period	Notability
Aerodrome	Langley	Experimental	Samuel Pierpoint Langley	1903	Unsuccessful. The Smithsonian Institution later made fraudulent claims for its success.
Akutan Zero	Mitsubishi A6M Zero	Fighter	US armed forces	World War II	Crash-landed on Akutan Island. It was recovered intact and test flown by the United States.
Aluminum Overcast	Boeing B-17 Flying Fortress	Bomber	Experimental Aircraft Association	1945-	One of ten flyable B-17s.
America (airship)		Private		1906–1910	Non-rigid airship. Attempted to fly to the North Pole and to cross the Atlantic.
America (aircraft)	Fokker C-2	Private			Flown across the Atlantic in 1927.
Balls 8	NB-52B variant of the Boeing B-52 Stratofortress	Research	NASA	1955–2004	Mothership for the North American X-15 rocket plane on many of its flights, and also served as a launcher for the Pegasus space rocket.
Bird of Paradise	Fokker C-2	Research	United States Army Air Corps	1927–1930	First flight from California to Hawaii on June 28–29, 1927.
Bockscar	Boeing B-29 Superfortress	Bomber	United States Army Air Forces	World War II	Dropped the Fat Man atomic bomb on Nagasaki.
Bremen	Junkers W 33	Private		1928	First transatlantic flight from east to west by a single-engined aircraft.
Caesar's Chariot	Boeing 720	Transport			Chartered by English rock band Led Zeppelin.
Cape Cod	Bellanca Special J-300	Transport	Russell Boardman and John Polando	1931	First nonstop flight of over 5,000 mi/8,000 km by a single-engined aircraft (New York City-Istanbul)
China Clipper	Martin M-130	Transport	Pan American Airways	1934–1945	First commercial transpacific air service from San Francisco to Manila.
City of Canberra	Boeing 747-400	Transport	Qantas	1989–2015	Longest non-stop un-refuelled flight by an airliner, from London to Sydney in 1989.
Clipper Victor	Boeing 747-121	Transport	Pan American World Airways	1969–1977	Hijacked and flown to Cuba in 1970. One of two aircraft involved in the Tenerife airport disaster.
Colditz Cock		Glider		World War II	Built by British prisoners of war being held in Oflag IV-C (aka Colditz Castle) for a proposed escape. Never flew.
Columbia, also named Miss Columbia and later Maple Leaf		Experimental		1926–1934	Set several records, including one for endurance.
Commando	Consolidated B-24 Liberator II	Transport	Royal Air Force	World War II	At one time the personal aircraft of Prime Minister Winston Churchill. Disappeared over the North Atlantic with several government officials on board.
Cornfield Bomber	Convair F-106 Delta Dart	Fighter	United States Air Force	1958–1988	After the pilot ejected during a flat spin, the unoccupied aircraft landed in a field, sustaining little damage.
Cuatro Vientos	Br.19 TF Super Bidon	Private		1929–1933	Flew from Spain to Cuba in 1933. Disappeared on a flight over Mexico.
Curtiss NC-4	Curtiss NC	Patrol	United States Navy	1919–1920	First aircraft to cross the Atlantic, making numerous stops along the way.
Curtiss No. 1, also known as Gold Bug and Golden Flyer		Experimental		1909	Glenn Curtiss flew the aircraft to win the Scientific American trophy.
Curtiss No. 2, also known as the Reims Racer		Experimental		1909–1910	Curtiss won the Gordon Bennett Cup air race in 1909.
Dago Red	North American P-51 Mustang	Private		1981-	Restored as a competitive air racer and set several world records.
Dauntless Dotty	Boeing B-29 Superfortress	Bomber	United States Army Air Forces	World War II	Led the first B-29 raid on Tokyo since the 1942 Doolittle Raid.
Deperdussin 1912 Racing Monoplane		Private		1911(?)-1912	First aircraft to exceed 100 mph (161 km/h) in level flight.
DZ203	Boeing 247	Transport	Royal Air Force	World War II	First aircraft to make fully automated hands-off approach and landing.
Enola Gay	Boeing B-29 Superfortress	Bomber	United States Army Air Forces	World War II	Dropped the first atomic bomb, on the city of Hiroshima, Japan.
Ezekiel Airship		Experimental	Ezekiel Airship Company	Destroyed c. 1904	Claimed to have flown in 1902, over a year before the Wright brothers' historic flight.
FIFI	Boeing B-29 Superfortress	Bomber	Commemorative Air Force	1942-	One of only two B-29s flying.
Flak-Bait	Martin B-26 Marauder	Bomber	United States Army Air Forces	World War II	Survived the most bombing missions in the war.
G for George	Avro Lancaster	Bomber	Royal Australian Air Force	World War II	Surviving example.
The Galloping Ghost	North American P-51D Mustang	Private			Won air races under various owners. Crashed in the 2011 Reno Air Races.
Glacier Girl	Lockheed P-38 Lightning	Fighter		1942	Surviving example.
Glamorous Glennis	Bell X-1	Experimental	United States Air Force		First to break the sound barrier in level flight.
Gossamer Albatross	MacCready	Experimental	AeroVironment	1979	First human-powered aircraft to cross the English Channel.
GlobalFlyer	Scaled Composites GlobalFlyer	Experimental	Steve Fossett	2005–2006	Set a record for flying nonstop around the world.
Gyroplane Laboratoire		Experimental		1935–1939	Helicopter. Set several records.
Hawaii Clipper	Martin M-130	Transport	Pan American Airways	1935(?)-1938	Disappeared with six passengers and nine crew en route from Guam to Manila.
Helicopter 66	Sikorsky SH-3 Sea King	ASW / SAR	U.S. Navy	1967–1975	Crashed in the Pacific Ocean while on a training exercise.
Honolulu Clipper	Boeing 314 Clipper	Transport	Pan American Airways; United States Navy	1939; World War II	The prototype 314, it entered service in 1939 on transpacific routes. Forced landing in the Pacific Ocean on November 3, 1945.
Ingenuity	One off by JPL	Experimental	NASA	2021 -	First powered atmospheric flight on other celestial body
June Bug	AEA	Experimental	Aerial Experiment Association	1908–1909	Won the first aeronautical prize ever awarded in the United States: the Scientific American Cup.
Junkers Ju 52 WkNr 130714	Junkers Ju 52/3mg8e	Transport	Quax Association	1936–2019	One of the oldest surviving Ju 52s
Kookaburra	Westland Widgeon	Private			Set down in the Australian Tanami Desert to make repairs and the crew died of thirst before they could clear a runway long enough to take off from.
Kuiper Airborne Observatory	Lockheed C-141A Starlifter	Research	NASA	1974–1995	Used for infrared astronomy research.
Lady Be Good	Consolidated B-24 Liberator	Bomber	United States Army Air Forces	World War II	Surviving example.
Lady Southern Cross	Lockheed Altair	Private		1934–1935	First eastward transpacific flight from Australia to the United States. Disappeared while attempting to break the speed record from England to Australia.
Lituanica	Bellanca CH-300	Private		1932–1933	Attempted a flight from New York to Kaunas, Lithuania, but crashed in Germany.
LN514	Vickers Wellington	Bomber	Royal Air Force	1943-?	Constructed in under 24 hours for propaganda purposes.
Lucky Lady II	Boeing B-50 Superfortress	Bomber	United States Air Force	1948–1950	First airplane to circle the world nonstop.
LZ 1	Zeppelin	Experimental	Gesellschaft zur Förderung der Luftschifffahrt	1900	First successful rigid airship.
LZ 37	Zeppelin	Bomber	Imperial German Navy (Kaiserliche Marine)	World War I	First Zeppelin shot down by an enemy aircraft.
LZ 127 Graf Zeppelin	Zeppelin	Transport	Luftschiffbau Zeppelin	1928–1940	Most successful airship in history; regular flights to North and South America; world tour in 1929, Arctic trip in 1931.
LZ 129 Hindenburg	Zeppelin	Transport	Luftschiffbau Zeppelin	1936–1937	Crashed and burned while landing, in one of the most famous air disasters of all time.
Memphis Belle	Boeing B-17 Flying Fortress	Bomber	United States Army Air Forces	World War II	Surviving example.
Miss Veedol, later The American Nurse	Bellanca CH-400 or Bellanca J-300	Private			First non-stop crossing of the Pacific Ocean from Japan to the United States, crash landing in Washington State. Sold and renamed The American Nurse. Disappeared while attempting to fly from New York to Rome.
My Gal Sal	Boeing B-17 Flying Fortress	Bomber		1942	One of only three intact B-17Es.
N763A	Douglas R4D-3	Transport		1942-	Used by the US Navy during World War II. Placed on the National Register of Historic Places in 1996.
N836D	Douglas DC-7B	Transport		1958-1965 (commercial use); 1965-2013 (private use)	
NASA 515	Heavily modified Boeing 737	Research	NASA	1967–2003	First 737 built.
Nine-O-Nine	Boeing B-17 Flying Fortress	Bomber	United States Army Air Forces	World War II	Surviving example.
Norge		Private			Semi-rigid airship. First confirmed overflight of, and first trip of any kind to, the North Pole.
L'Oiseau Blanc	Levasseur PL.8 biplane	Private		1927	Disappeared while attempting the first non-stop transatlantic flight between Paris and New York, two weeks before Lindbergh's successful flight the other way.
Old 666	Boeing B-17 Flying Fortress	Bomber	United States Army Air Forces	World War II	Surviving example.
Old Glory	Fokker F.VIIa	Private			Lost while attempting to fly across the Atlantic from New York.
PA474	Avro Lancaster	Bomber	Royal Air Force	1945-	One of only two Lancasters in flying condition.
Pacific Clipper	Boeing 314 Clipper	Transport	Pan American World Airways		As the California Clipper, flew around the world. Renamed afterward.
Pedaliante		Experimental		1936–1937	Made one of the first human-powered flights.
Philippine Clipper	Martin M-130	Transport	Pan American Airways; United States Navy	1935–1943; World War II	Inaugurated passenger service between the United States and Manila, the Philippines. Crashed in 1943 with the loss of all on board.
Piccadilly Lilly II	Boeing B-17 Flying Fortress	Bomber	Edward T. Maloney	?-1959; 1959–1971	Surviving example. Featured on TV show Twelve O'Clock High.
The Pink Lady	Boeing B-17 Flying Fortress	Bomber	United States Army Air Forces	1944-	Surviving example.
Plus Ultra	Dornier Do J	Private		1926	First transatlantic flight between Spain and South America.
PZ865	Hawker Hurricane	Fighter	Royal Air Force	1944-	Last Hurricane produced. Royal Air Force Battle of Britain Memorial Flight.
Question Mark	Modified C-2A	Transport	United States Army Air Corps		Modified for aerial refueling experiments. Set several world endurance records.
R34	British R33-class airship	Military airship	Royal Air Force	1919–1921	First-ever aircraft of any type to make a transatlantic flight from east to west (July 2–6, 1919)
Rare Bear	Highly modified Grumman F8F Bearcat	Private			Won many Reno Air Races.
Red Baron	Modified North American P-51D Mustang	Private		1967–1973	Raced as Miss R.J. and Roto-Finish Special, winning the Unlimited circuit.
Red Wing	AEA	Experimental		1908	First public demonstration of a powered aircraft flight in the United States, crashed after 20 seconds and written off.
Sally B	Boeing B-17G Flying Fortress	Bomber	B-17 Preservation Ltd	1945-	Surviving example. Featured in the 1990 film Memphis Belle.
Santos-Dumont number 6		Private	Alberto Santos-Dumont	1901	Airship. Won the Deutsch de la Meurthe prize for a flight from Parc Saint Cloud to the Eiffel Tower and back.
Santos-Dumont 14-bis Oiseau de proie		Private	Alberto Santos-Dumont	1906	First officially witnessed sustained flight by a heavier-than-air craft on October 23, 1906.
Sausewind		Private		1925	Won in several categories in the 1925 Otto Lilienthal competition.
Sentimental Journey	Boeing B-17G Flying Fortress	Bomber	Commemorative Air Force	1945-	Surviving example.
Shady Lady	Consolidated B-24 Liberator	Bomber	United States Army Air Forces	World War II	Surviving example.
Shoo Shoo Baby	Boeing B-17 Flying Fortress	Bomber		1944–1961	Surviving example.
Silver Dart		Experimental		1909	First powered, heavier-than-air machine to fly in Canada.
Southern Cross	Fokker F.VIIb/3m	Private		1928	First transpacific flight to Australia from the mainland United States.
Spirit of St. Louis		Private		1927	Charles Lindbergh's aircraft for the first solo non-stop crossing of the Atlantic.
Spirit of Texas	Bell 206L-1 LongRanger II helicopter	Private		1982	First helicopter to complete a staged round-the world flight.
Spruce Goose	Hughes H-4 Hercules	Experimental	Evergreen Aviation Museum	1947	The largest flying boat ever built, and the largest wingspan of any aircraft that has ever flown.
St. Raphael	Fokker F.VIIa	Private		1927	Lost while attempting the first Atlantic crossing from east to west.
Stargazer	Lockheed L-1011 TriStar	Research	Orbital ATK	1994-	Used as a mother ship to launch Pegasus rockets.
The Starship	Boeing 720	Transport	Singer and actor Bobby Sherman and his manager, Ward Sylvester	1970s	Leased to touring musical artists.
Supermarine Spitfire prototype K5054	Supermarine Spitfire	Fighter	Royal Air Force	1936	Only prototype of iconic aircraft.
Swamp Ghost	Boeing B-17 Flying Fortress	Bomber		1941	Surviving example.
The Swoose	Boeing B-17 Flying Fortress	Bomber	United States Army Air Forces	World War II	Oldest surviving B-17.
Texas Raiders	Boeing B-17G Flying Fortress	Bomber	Commemorative Air Force	1944–2022	Destroyed in Mid Air Collision November 12, 2022
That's All, Brother	Douglas C-47 Skytrain	Transport	Commemorative Air Force	1944-	Led the formation of aircraft in the D-Day landings.
Thunderbird	Boeing B-17G Flying Fortress	Bomber		1943–1945	Surviving example.
Tingmissartoq	Lockheed Model 8 Sirius	Private	Charles and Anne Morrow Lindbergh	1929–1933	
Vega 1 balloon	Lavochkin	Research	USSR	June 1985	First unpowered atmospheric flight on another celestial body
Vin Fiz Flyer	Modified Wright Model B (Model EX)	Private	Calbraith Perry Rodgers	1911	First to fly coast to coast in stages across the United States.
VS-300	Vought-Sikorsky	Experimental		1939–1943	First successful single-rotor helicopter in the United States, first successful use of a single vertical tail rotor to counteract torque and, with floats attached, first practical amphibious helicopter.
Voyager		Experimental		1984–1987	First aircraft to fly around the world without stopping or refueling.
White Knight	Scaled Composites	Experimental; Research	Scaled Composites	2000s	mother ship for the SpaceShipOne and Boeing X-37 experimental spaceplanes.
Worry Bird	North American P-51 Mustang	Fighter		1944-1957 (military use); in airworthy condition at the Air Combat Museum	Listed on the National Register of Historic Places in 1999.
Wright Flyer		Experimental	Wright brothers	1903	First successful heavier-than-air powered flight, on December 17, 1903.
XH558, aka Spirit of Great Britain	Avro Vulcan	Bomber	Vulcan To The Sky Trust	1960–1993; 2007–2015	Restored to flight in 2007, finally grounded in 2015.
Yankee Lady	Boeing B-17 Flying Fortress	Bomber	Yankee Air Force	1945-	Surviving example.
