= Donald S. Jones =

United States navy admiral

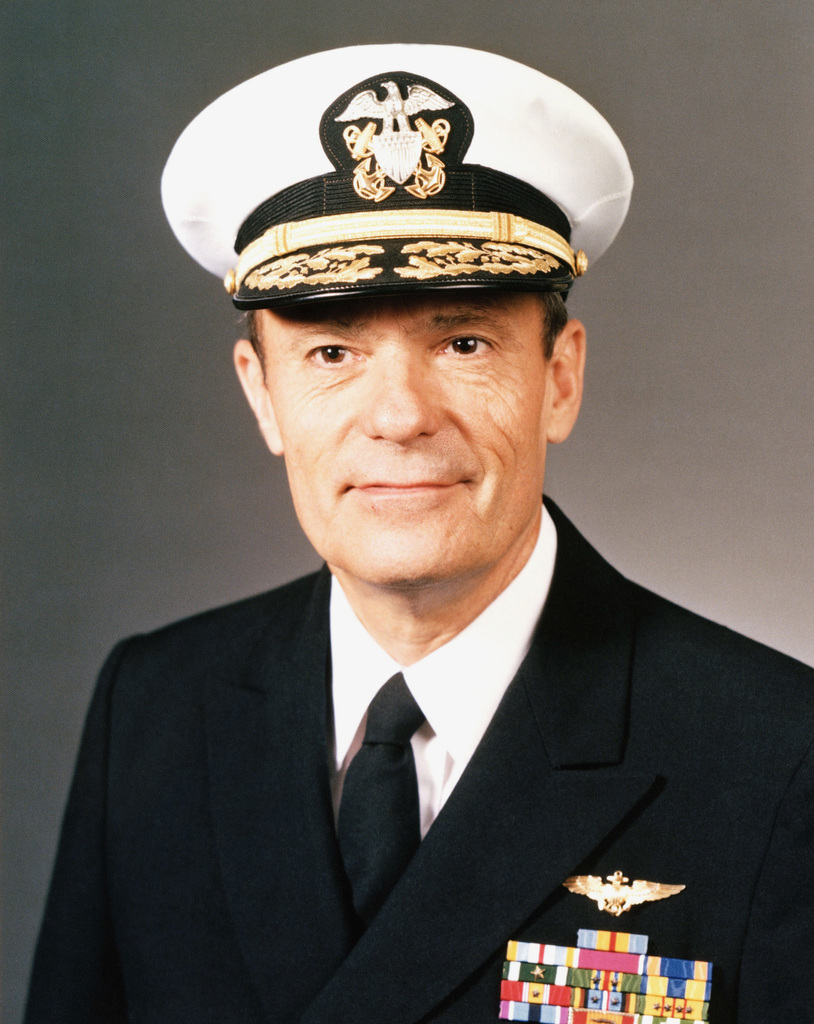
- Born: May 18, 1928; Madison, Wisconsin
- Died: December 13, 2004 (aged 76); Lancaster, Pennsylvania
- Burial place: Fort Rosecrans National Cemetery, San Diego
- Military career
- Allegiance: United States
- Branch: United States Navy
- Service years: 1950–1987
- Rank: Vice Admiral
- Commands: Helicopter Antisubmarine Squadron Four (HS-4); Carrier ASW Air Group Fifty-Three; USS Denver (LPD-9); Amphibious Squadron Seven; Amphibious Group One; Amphibious Forces Seventh Fleet; United States Third Fleet
- Awards: Defense Distinguished Service Medal (2); Navy Distinguished Service Medal (2); Legion of Merit

Vice Admiral Donald S. Jones (May 18, 1928 – December 13, 2004) was a United States Navy admiral.

== Biography ==
Don Jones was born in Madison, Wisconsin, graduated from the University of Wisconsin–Madison, earned an MSA Degree from George Washington University, completed the Naval Postgraduate School course in National Security Affairs and attended the Industrial College of the Armed Forces.

Jones commenced active duty as a Naval Aviation Cadet in 1950 and after receiving his "Wings of Gold" he began a career-long association with helicopters and fixed-wing anti-submarine warfare. Postings with Air Development Squadron One, as a test and evaluation pilot, and Helicopter Squadrons One and Five were devoted to integrating the ASW helicopter into attack carrier aviation. He commanded a detachment of helicopters tasked to evaluate their role in the complex operational environment of the Attack Carrier. This deployment set the stage for the routine involvement of the helicopter in Battle Group operations.

While Commanding Officer of Helicopter Antisubmarine Squadron Four (HS-4 "Black Knights"), he was tasked to NASA to develop night and all-weather astronaut recovery procedures for the Apollo program. As a result of this effort, HS-4 was designated the helicopter recovery squadron for five Apollo missions – 8, 10, 11, 12 and 13. Jones himself was the recovery pilot for the first Moon orbital flight of Apollo 8 and the first Moon landing flight of Apollo 11. The primary recovery ship for Apollo 11 was Hornet (CV-12).

Jones had a total of seven Command assignments at sea including Carrier ASW Air Group Fifty-Three, Denver (LPD-9), Amphibious Squadron Seven, Amphibious Group One, and Amphibious Forces Seventh Fleet. His last operational assignment was Commander, Third Fleet, with responsibility of the training and readiness of all Naval forces from the West Coast of the United States.

Shore assignments included duty on the staff of the Chief of Naval Operations, Deputy Director of Naval Intelligence, DCNO for Operations Plans and Policy, Office of the Secretary of Defense as Director of East Asia Policy and Senior Military Assistant to the Deputy Secretary. His last billet prior to retirement was Senior Military Assistant to the Secretary of Defense, the only officer to have held this important post for both the Deputy Secretary of Defense and Secretary of Defense.

After retirement as a Vice Admiral, Jones was Trustee of the Naval Aviation Museum Foundation, the Naval Helicopter Association and the Association of Naval Aviation.

== Awards ==
Recognition for his military service includes two Defense Distinguished Service Medals, two Navy Distinguished Service Medals, the Legion of Merit and numerous personal and theater awards.
