= Douglas R4D-3 N763A =

- US Army Aircraft C-53-DO-41-20124
- U.S. National Register of Historic Places
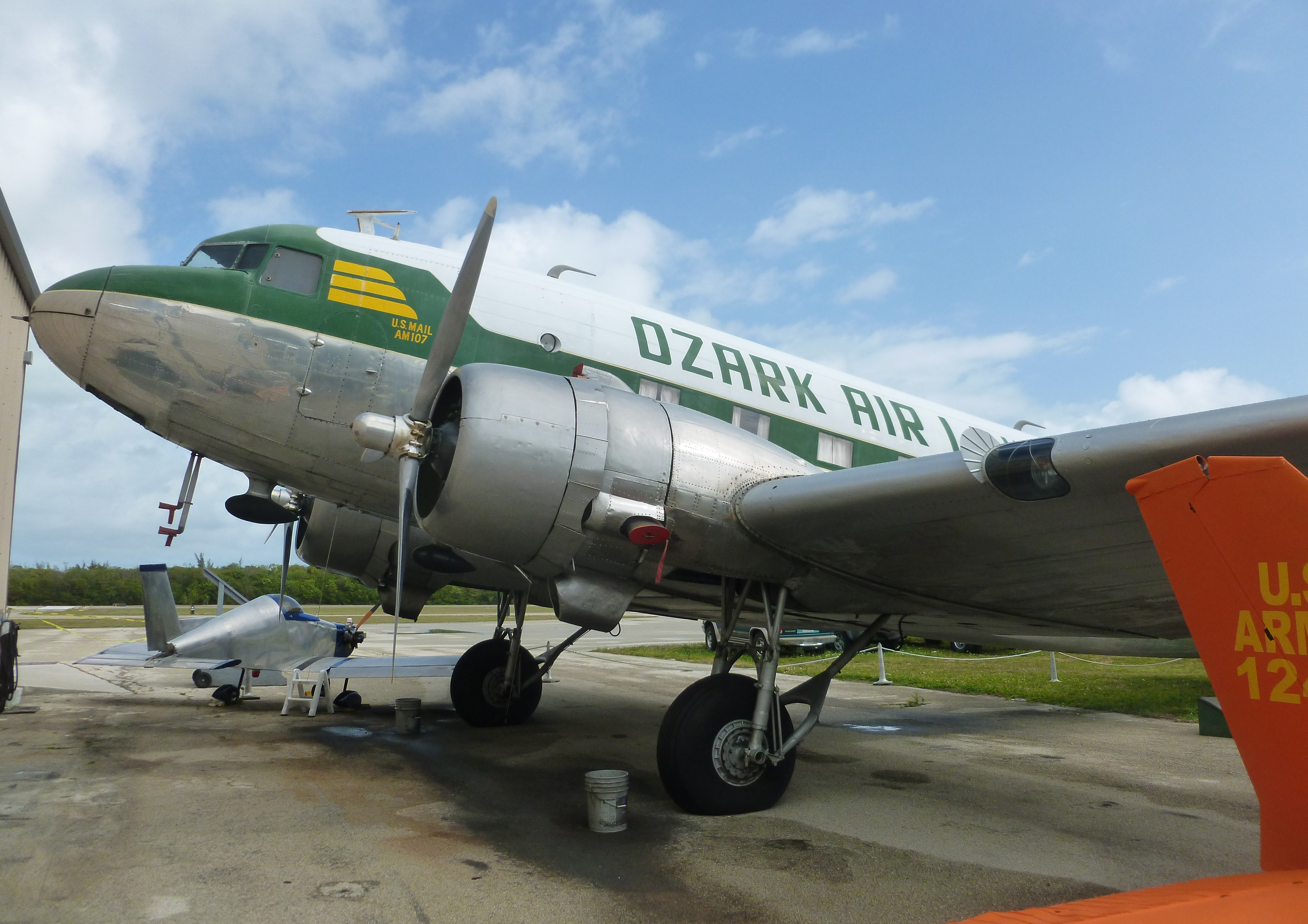
- N763A seen at Florida Keys Marathon Airport in 2015

- Location within Illinois Location within the United States
- Location: 1.25 miles (2.01 km) E of junction of IL 9 and IL 5, Bloomington, Illinois
- Coordinates: 40°29′7″N 88°55′52″W
- Built: 1942
- Architect: Douglas Aircraft Company, Inc.
- Architectural style: Passenger/Light Cargo/DC-3
- NRHP reference No.: 96000857
- Added to NRHP: August 1, 1996

Former United States Army Air Force aircraft serial number 41-20124 is a World War II era fully restored Douglas DC-3, owned by a private party and based at Marathon Key, FL. Civil registered as N763A the aircraft has also been operated by the United States Navy with the designation R4D-3 and serial number 05078. The aircraft has been listed on the National Register of Historic Places since August 1, 1996.

== Manufacture ==
While this specific C-53 rolled off the assembly line on March 11, 1942, it is one example of 399 such aircraft manufactured by Douglas Aircraft Company of Santa Monica, California. The aircraft was immediately transferred to the US Navy and operated with VU-1 as an R4D-1.

The aircraft model, known officially as the "Skytrooper," was produced for the U.S. Army Air Force as a passenger and light cargo craft prior to and during World War II.
