= HSC-4 =

Helicopter Sea Combat Squadron Four (HSC-4)
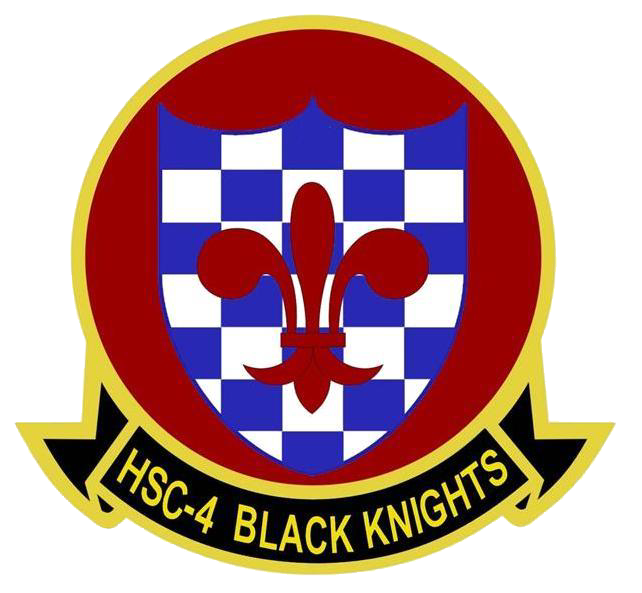
- HSC-4 Insignia
- Active: 30 June 1952 – present
- Country: United States of America
- Branch: United States Navy
- Type: Helicopter Sea Combat
- Role: Logistics, Strike, Medevac, HA/DR, Anti-Surface Warfare (ASUW); Combat Search & Rescue (CSAR); Search & Rescue (SAR); Special Operations (SpecOps); Vertical replenishment (VERTREP)
- Part of: CVW-2
- Garrison/HQ: NAS North Island
- Nickname: Black Knights
- Engagements: Vietnam War; Operation Formation Star; Operation Restore Hope; Operation Southern Watch; 1994 North Korean nuclear crisis Operation Enduring Freedom; Operation Iraqi Freedom; Operation Prosperity Guardian; Operation Poseidon Archer

Aircraft flown
- Utility helicopter: HO4S-3; SH-34 Seabat; SH-3 Sea King; SH-60 Seahawk

Helicopter Sea Combat Squadron Four (HSC-4) (previously Helicopter Anti-Submarine Squadron Four (HS-4)), also known as the Black Knights, is a multi-role combat helicopter squadron of the United States Navy based at Naval Air Station North Island which operates Sikorsky MH-60S Seahawk helicopters deployed aboard aircraft carriers. The squadron was originally established as HS-4 on 30 June 1952 at U.S. Naval Auxiliary Landing Field Imperial Beach with the Sikorsky HO3S-1 and was redesignated HSC-4 on 29 March 2012. It is currently assigned to Carrier Air Wing Two (CVW-2) which deploys aboard USS Carl Vinson (CVN-70).

== History ==
=== 1952–1968 ===
Helicopter Antisubmarine Squadron FOUR (HS-4) was established on 30 June 1952 aboard Naval Air Station Imperial Beach flying the Sikorsky HO3S-1. It was the first anti-submarine warfare (ASW) helicopter squadron of the U.S. Navy to deploy aboard an aircraft carrier, the escort carrier USS Rendova (CVE-114). In 1954/55 HS-4 was deployed in Essex-class aircraft carrier USS Princeton (CV-37). In 1956 the squadron transitioned to the dipping sonar equipped HSS-1 Seabat vastly improving its antisubmarine capability and deployed aboard USS Boxer (CV-21). This was followed by a cruise aboard Princeton again in 1958. In 1959 the squadron upgraded to the doppler radar and autopilot equipped HSS-1N Seabat helicopter giving it the ability to operate at night and in marginal weather. HS-4 could be identified at that time by the tail code "TA" (1955–1960). In 1961, it became the first ASW squadron in Commander Naval Air Forces Pacific (COMNAVAIRPAC) to achieve around-the-clock ASW capability, earning HS-4 the name "Black Knights".

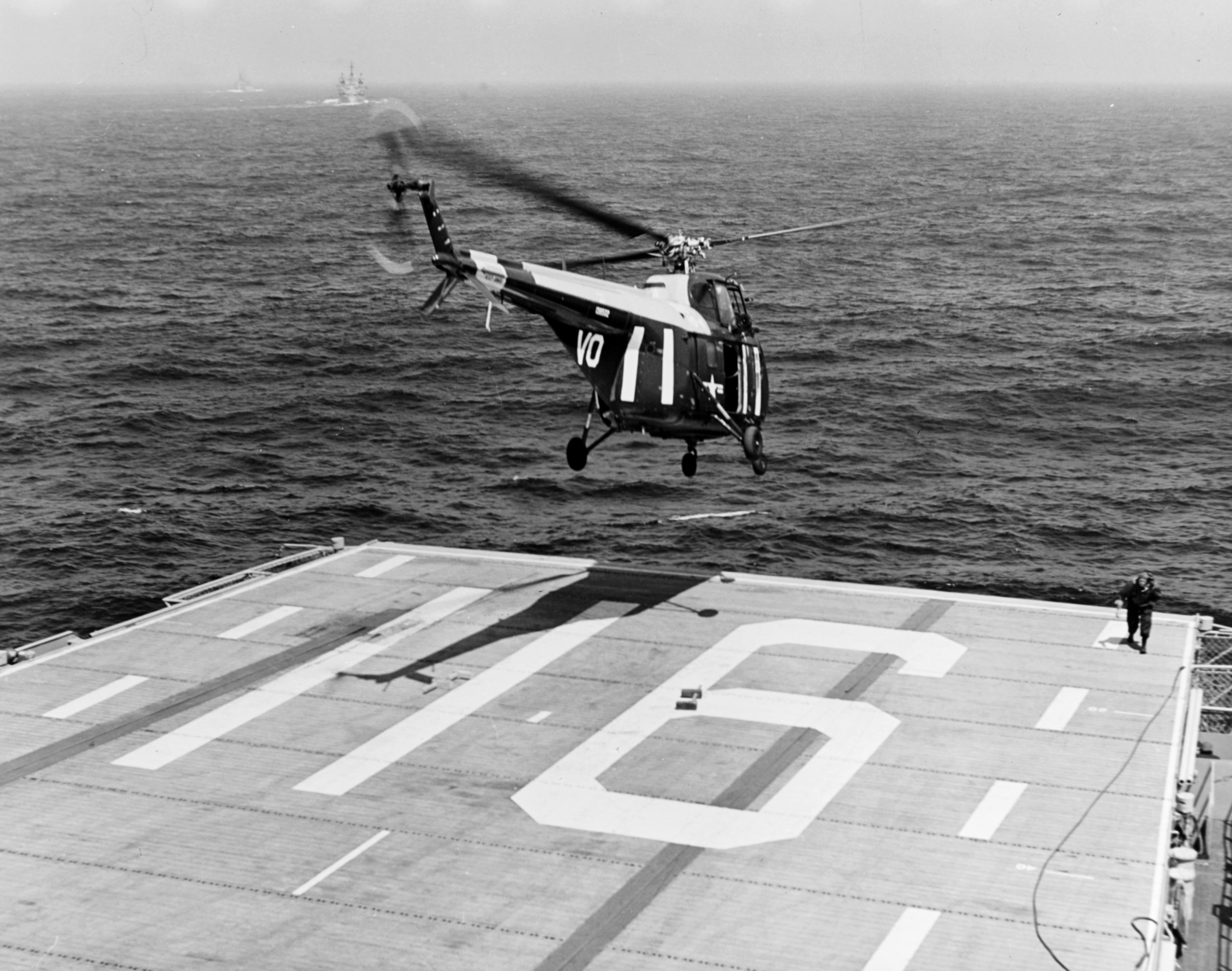
HS-4 HO4S taking off from Badoeng Strait (CVE-116) in 1954.

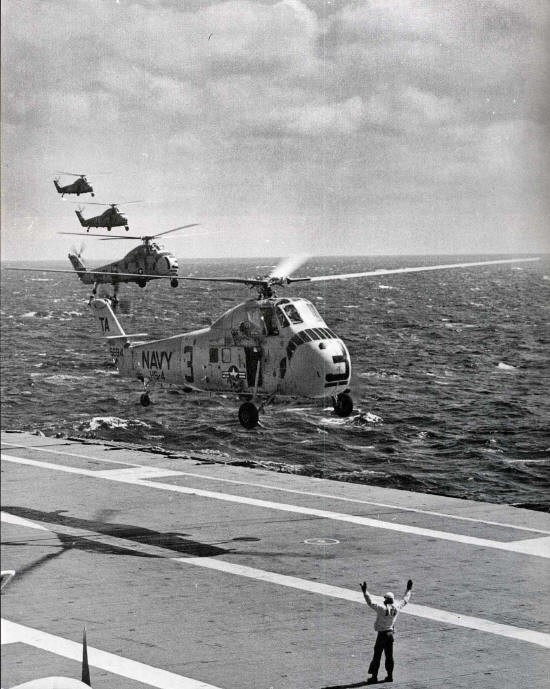
HSS-1Ns of HS-4 on Yorktown (CV-10) in 1960.

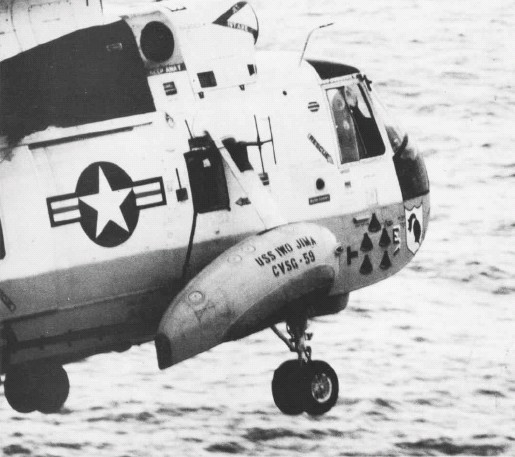
The famous Helicopter 66 of HS-4 during the Apollo 13 recovery.

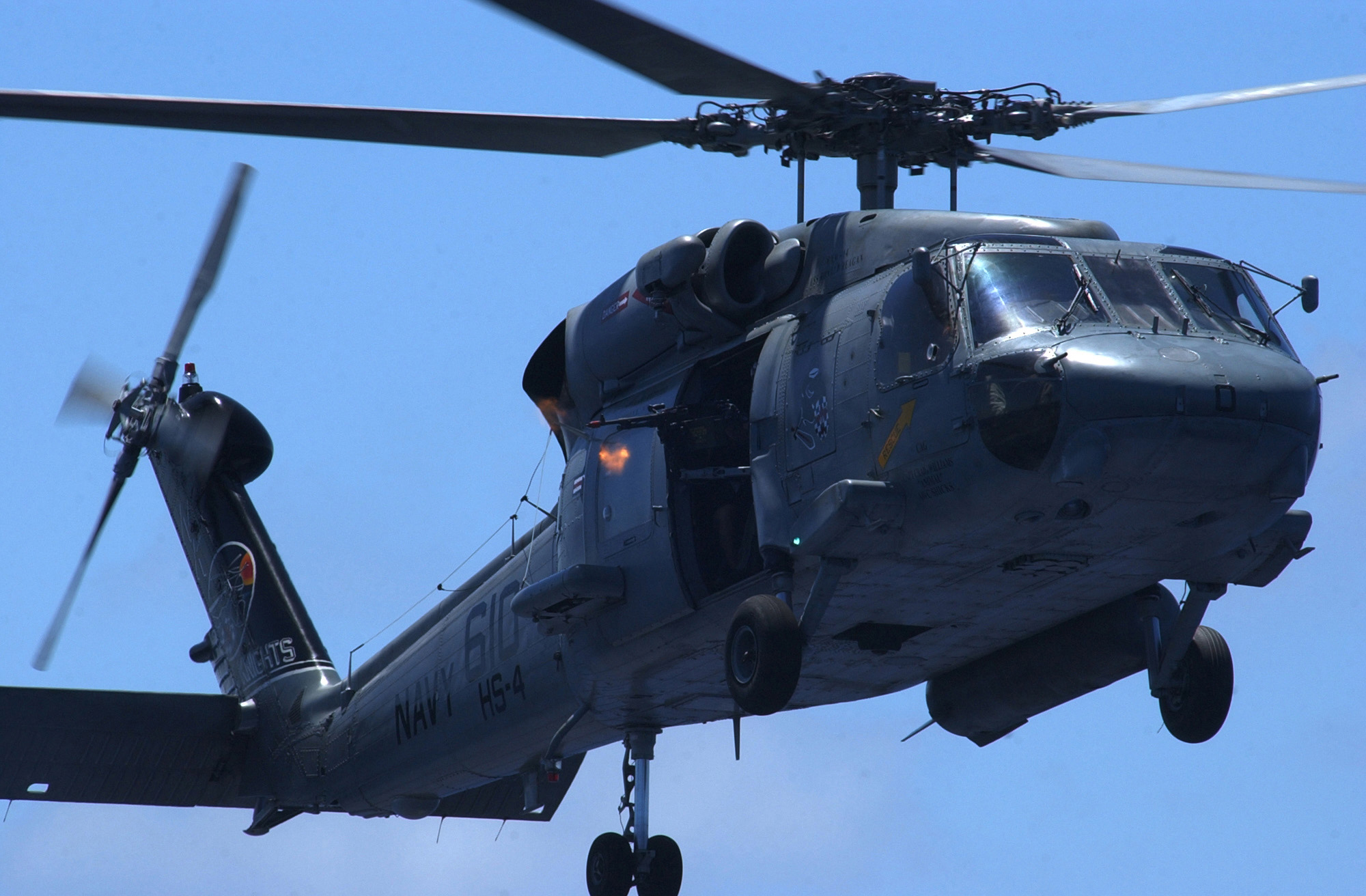
SH-60F of HS-4 in 2006.

From 1960 to 1968 HS-4 made six deployments aboard USS Yorktown (CV-10) to the Western Pacific as part of Carrier Anti-Submarine Air Group 55 (CVSG-55) (tail code "NU"). In September 1962 the squadron's HSS-1N helicopters were re-designated to the SH-35G Seabat in compliance with the 1962 United States Tri-Service aircraft designation system. In 1964 the squadron converted to the Sikorsky SH-3A Sea King. HS-4 was initiated into combat during its 1966 cruise to Southeast Asia. While operating in the Gulf of Tonkin, HS-4 pilots and aircrew rescued 24 downed airmen under hostile fire, a record for an ASW squadron in a single deployment. In 1968 HS-4 aboard Yorktown was part of the Task Force sent to the Sea of Japan at the beginning of the USS Pueblo incident.

=== 1968–1990 ===
In 1968 the squadron transitioned to the multi-sensor equipped SH-3D Sea King. From 1968 to 1970 HS-4 was assigned to Carrier Anti-Submarine Air Group 59 (CVSG-59) (tail code "NT") aboard USS Hornet (CVS-12). From late 1968 through the spring of 1970, the Black Knights of HS-4 participated in and pioneered techniques for the Apollo capsule recoveries. HS-4 was on scene for Apollo missions 8, 10, 11, 12, and 13. The recovery was always made by "Helicopter 66". The helicopter's side number was changed from "66" to "740" after the Apollo 11 recovery as the U.S. Navy had switched to a three digit aircraft number system – but the helicopter was repainted with the number "66" for each recovery thereafter for public relations reasons. HS-4 earned a Meritorious Unit Commendation (MUC) for these recoveries. For the recovery of Apollo 10 in May 1969, HS-4 was assigned to the Amphibious Assault Ship USS Princeton (CV-37). For the recovery of Apollo 13 in April 1970, HS-4 was assigned to the Amphibious Assault Ship USS Iwo Jima (LPH-2).

In 1971 HS-4 was deployed for the last time in an anti-submarine carrier, USS Ticonderoga (CVS-14). Between 1973 and 1979, HS-4 made three cruises aboard USS Ranger (CV-61) and USS Kitty Hawk (CV-63) as a part of Carrier Air Wing 11 (CVW-11) where they helped to develop the CV concept which integrated the former "Anti-Submarine Air Group" and "Attack Carrier Air Wing" into the new "Carrier Air Wing". They briefly sifted to Carrier Air Wing Two (CVW-2) for the second cruise but shifted back to CVW-11 afterwards. On 15 October 1976, HS-4's official homeport changed from NAS Imperial Beach to NAS North Island. In 1977 the squadron's SH-3D helicopters were replaced by the SH-3H Sea King which the squadron would fly for the next decade and a half. HS-4 was then assigned to Carrier Air Wing Fifteen (CVW-15) and made one more deployment aboard Kitty Hawk, followed by seven cruises aboard USS Carl Vinson (CVN-70) between 1983 and 1990.

HS-4 won numerous awards during this period: seven-time winner of the Chief of Naval Operations Aviation Safety Award, Arleigh Burke Fleet Trophy in 1978, five-time winner of the Battle 'E' (Battle Efficiency), three-time winner of the Captain Arnold J. Tobell trophy for ASW excellence and the Sikorsky 'Excellence in Maintenance' Award for 1979, 1982 and 1983.

=== 1991–2006 ===
In 1991, HS-4 transitioned from the SH-3H Sea King to the Sikorsky SH-60F and HH-60H Seahawk helicopters and returned to Kitty Hawk as part of CVW-15 for three deployments between 1991 and 1994. They supported Operations Restore Hope and Southern Watch in 1994, and supported the carrier battle group during Korean contingency operations with detachments to both Korea and Japan.

When CVW-15 was deactivated, HS-4 was reassigned to CVW-14 in January 1995. In 1996 HS-4 made a single deployment aboard Carl Vinson before CVW-14 and the Black Knights were assigned to USS Abraham Lincoln (CVN-72) from 1998 to 2003. Their duties included military operations in Pakistan, detachments in Kuwait and combat search and rescue training in Australia, all in support of "Operation Southern Watch" and Operation Enduring Freedom. During Operation Iraqi Freedom, HS-4 supported Navy SEAL, British Commando and Polish GROM forces in Kuwait and Iraq. The nine and one half month deployment (a record since the Second World War) included 1283 sorties and 3228 flight hours flown.

In 2004, HS-4 and CVW-14 were reassigned to USS John C. Stennis (CVN-74). On board Stennis, HS-4 completed a cruise to the Western Pacific, which took the squadron from San Diego, to Alaska, Victoria, British Columbia, Canada, Japan, Malaysia and Australia. In 2006 HS-4 and CVW-14 transferred to USS Ronald Reagan (CVN-76) for her maiden deployment. On this deployment HS-4 detached its HH-60Hs into Basra, Iraq to support coalition troops in the region.

=== 2007–2016 ===
HS-4 deployed in 2007 and again in 2008 when the squadron supported the Typhoon Fengshen survivors in the Philippines before heading to the North Arabian Sea to support U.S. and Coalition forces on the ground in Afghanistan. In 2009, HS-4 completed a Surge deployment, supporting operations in Afghanistan. From 12 MAR to 4 MAY 2011, the Black Knights participated in Operation Tomadochi in Japan to help the stricken country by airlifting medical supplies and food. The 9.0 earthquake and tsunami that struck Japan had the helicopters assigned to USS Ronald Reagan (CVN-76) working around the clock. This humanitarian relief effort and subsequent movement to the 5th fleet AOR for Operations New Dawn and Enduring Freedom, completed the final SH-60F/HH-60H deployment for HS-4.

On 29 March 2012, Helicopter Anti-Submarine Squadron Four (HS-4) became Helicopter Sea Combat Squadron Four (HSC-4) in conjunction with its transition to the MH-60S Seahawk. Upon completion of the transition, the squadron was reassigned to Carrier Air Wing Two (CVW-2). The inaugural deployment of the MH-60S with HSC-4 is on the horizon for 2017.

== See also ==
- History of the United States Navy
- List of United States Navy aircraft squadrons
