= Carrier Strike Group Seven 2007–09 operations =

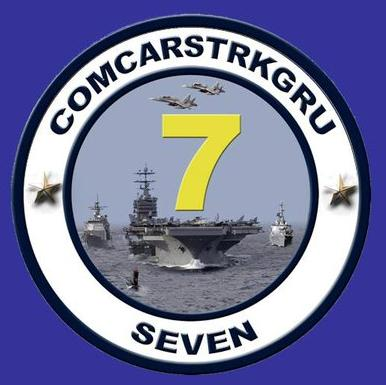
Carrier Strike Group Seven crest

Carrier Strike Group Seven 2007–09 operations included two deployments to the U.S. Fifth Fleet, and its embarked Carrier Air Wing Fourteen flew 2750 air sorties in support of ground forces in Iraq and Afghanistan while CARSTRKGRU-7 surface warships supported theater security and maritime interdiction operation within that fleet's area of responsibility. CARSTRKGRU-7 also made a Western Pacific surge deployment in place of Carrier Strike Group Five.

Units of Carrier Strike Group Seven, both individually and collectively, participated in bilateral exercises such as RSOI/Foal Eagle 2007, Talisman Saber 2007, Malabar 2008, and Malabar 2011, as well as multilateral exercises like SEACAT 2008 and RIMPAC 2010. Additionally, Carrier Strike Group Seven provided humanitarian assistance and disaster relief (HA/DR) support during Typhoon Fengshen in 2008.

The group was based at Naval Air Station North Island, California, and it typically deployed to the U.S. Seventh Fleet operating in the Western Pacific (WESTPAC) and the U.S. Fifth Fleet in the Indian Ocean and the Persian Gulf. The Nimitz-class nuclear-powered aircraft carrier USS Ronald Reagan (CVN-76) served as the flagship for Carrier Strike Group Seven during this operation period.

== 2007 surge deployment ==
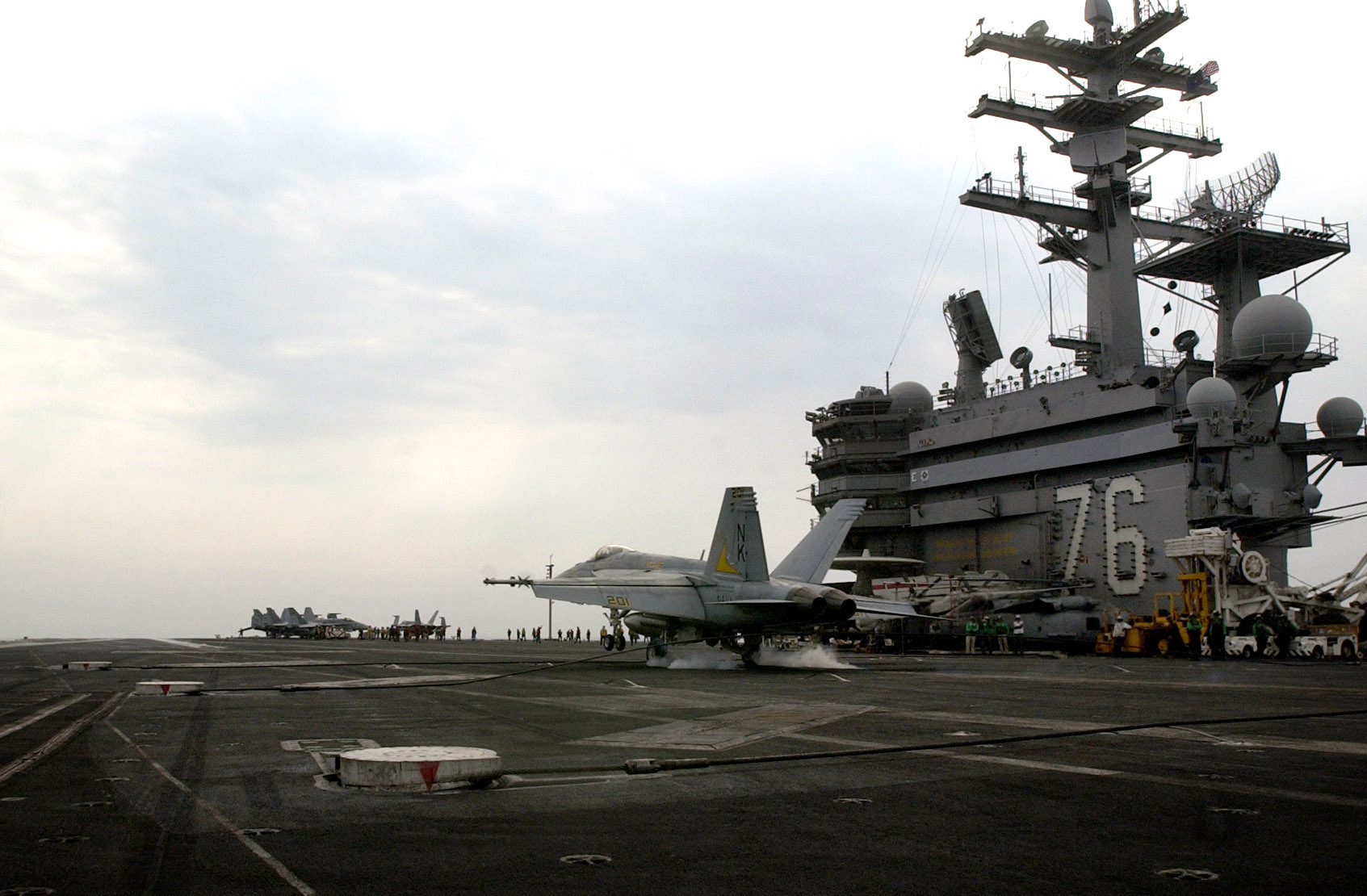
1,000th carrier-arrested landing

On 27 January 2007, Carrier Strike Group Seven (CARSTRKGRU-7) departed from San Diego for its Western Pacific (WESTPAC) surge deployment. CARSTRKGRU-7 deployed under the U.S. Navy's Fleet Response Plan (FRP) and will operate in the western Pacific in support of U.S. commitments in the region while the flagship of the forward-based Carrier Strike Group Five flagship, the aircraft carrier USS Kitty Hawk (CV-63), began its scheduled maintenance period in Yokosuka, Japan. The FRP provided the U.S. Navy with the ability to respond to any global commitment with flexible and sustainable forces and the ability to rapidly respond to a range of situations on short notice.

In 2007, Carrier Strike Group Seven (CARSTRKGRU-7) entered the U.S. Seventh Fleet's area of responsibility (AOR). Admiral Charles W. Martoglio, the commander of Carrier Strike Group Seven (COMCARSTRKGRU-7), noted:

Our friends and allies in the region can be assured of continued, strong engagement with our Navy through mutual training opportunities, exchanges, and port visits. We remain committed to maintaining peace and stability in the Pacific region.

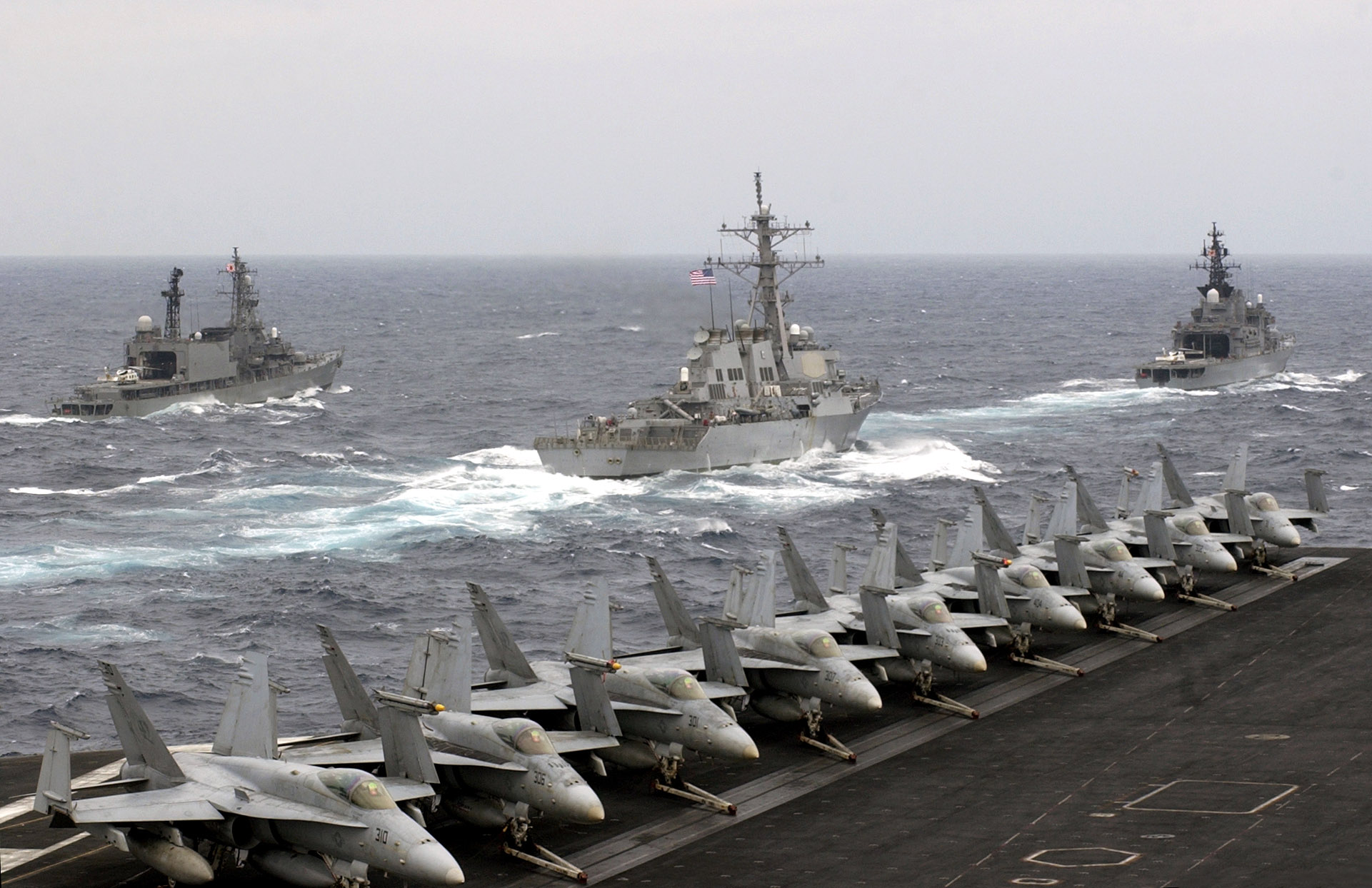
PASSEX (18 March 2007)

Between 16–18 March 2007, Carrier Strike Group Seven took part in a passing exercise (PASSEX) with the Japanese Maritime Self Defense Force (JMSDF) in the Philippine Sea. The goal of the exercise was for (CARSTRKGRU-7) to work with their JMSDF counterparts in such areas of mutual interest, including drills in communications, precision maneuvering, air defense tactics, and surface warfare tactics. Ronald Reagan also conducted a fueling at sea with each of the four JMSDF ships, as well as a photo exercise (pictured) and a pass in review. COMCARSTRKGRU-7 Admiral Martoglio noted:

We value our close relationship with our counterparts in the JMSDF as we work together to address regional issues of vital importance to both countries. The United States Navy and the Japanese Maritime Self-Defense Force share a unique bond, featuring one of the most robust bilateral exercise programs between any two nations. This PASSEX provides an opportunity for our navies to strengthen military-to-military ties and is designed to enhance both forces’ capability for coordinated and joint operations.

Also, to facilitate better communications, both navies participated in an officer exchange program that ensured a seamless integration of two naval forces.

On 6 April 2007, Carrier Strike Group Seven departed the U.S. Seventh Fleet's AOR. On 7 April 2007, the carrier Ronald Reagan concluded its three-day munitions offload to the MSC ammunition ship Flint, signifying the end of its Seventh Fleet deployment.

On 20 April 2007, Carrier Strike Group Seven returned to its home base of Naval Air Station North Island, California, completing its WESTPAC surge deployment. One highlight of the 2007 WESTPAC surge deployment occurred on 15 March 2007 when Captain Richard “Rhett” Butler made his 1,000th carrier-arrested landing. He was flying an F/A-18E Super Hornet from Strike Fighter Squadron 115 (VFA-115), and he caught the No. 2 arresting wire aboard the carrier Ronald Reagan at approximately 3:15 pm, local time (pictured). Captain Butler was the commander of Carrier Air Wing Fourteen.

=== 2007 WESTPAC force composition ===
Units	CARSTRKGRU 7 Warships	Carrier Air Wing Fourteen (CVW-14) squadrons embarked aboard flagship USS Ronald Reagan (CVN-76)	
No. 1	USS Lake Champlain (CG-57)	Strike Fighter Squadron 115 (VFA-115): F/A-18E	Electronic Attack Squadron 139 (VAQ-139): EA-6B
No. 2	USS Paul Hamilton (DDG-60)	Strike Fighter Squadron 113 (VFA-113): F/A-18E	Airborne Early Warning Squadron 113 (VAW-113): E-2C 2000
No. 3	USS Russell (DDG-59)	Strike Fighter Squadron 25 (VFA-25): F/A-18C(N)	Helicopter Anti-Submarine Squadron Four (HS-4): SH-60F/HH-60H
No. 4	EOD Unit 11, Det. 15	Strike Fighter Squadron 22 (VFA-22): F/A-18C(N)	Carrier Logistics Support Squadron 30 (VRC-30): C-2A
Notes			

=== RSOI/Foal Eagle 2007 ===
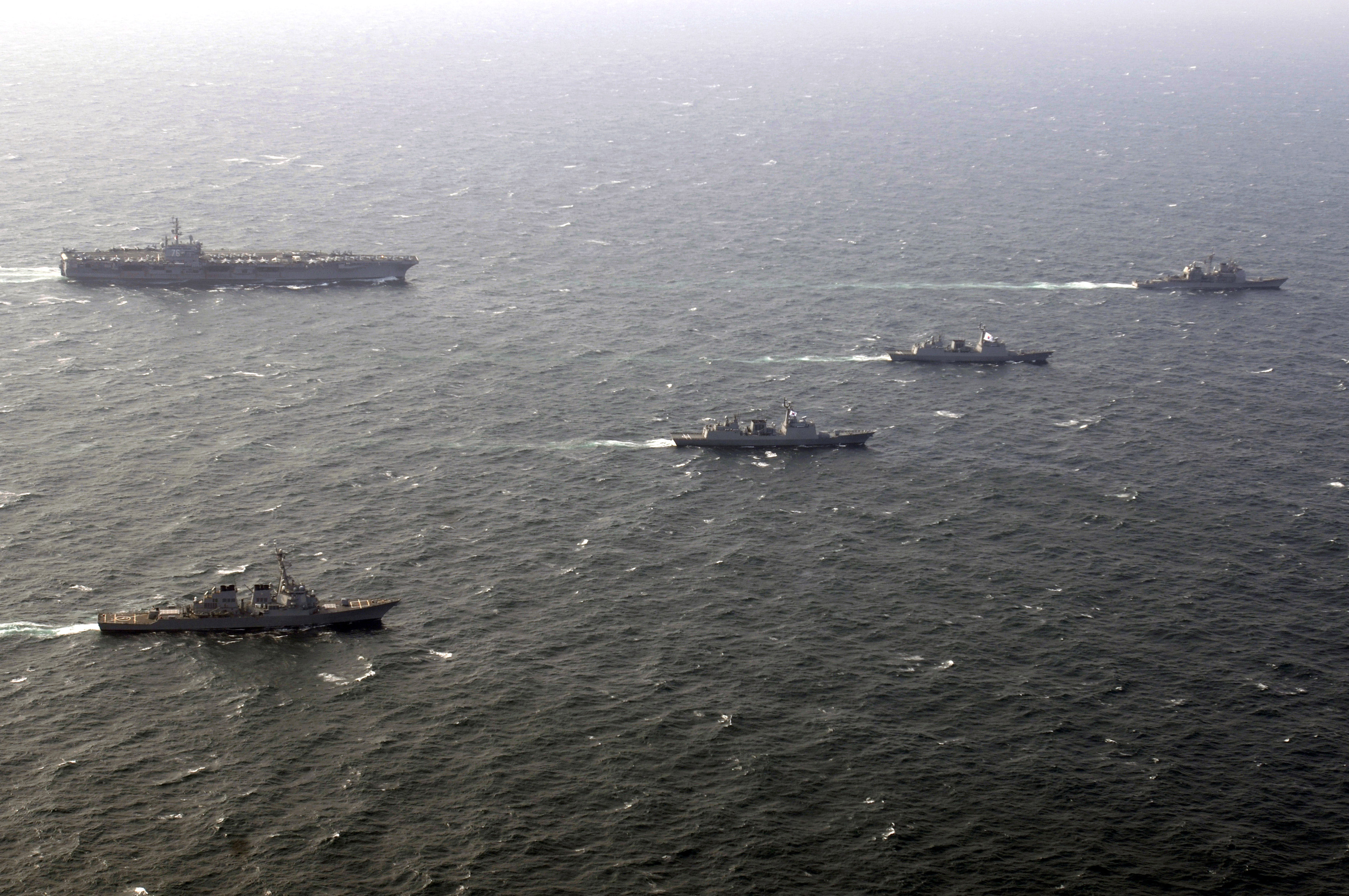
RSOI/Foal Eagle 2007

On 25 March 2007, Carrier Strike Group Seven joined US-ROK military forces in Exercise RSOI/Foal Eagle 2007 (RSOI/FE 07), a scheduled seven-day combined/joint exercise conducted annually involving forces from both the United States and the Republic of Korea. RSOI and FE are theater-wide, computer-simulated and field exercises designed to evaluate and improve the U.S. and ROK forces ability to coordinate the procedures, plans and systems necessary to defend the ROK in a contingency. RSOI/FE 07 was designed to provide training for our forces in the various aspects of reception, staging, onward movement, and integration as well as focusing on rear area security and sustainment operations. Strike group commander Rear Admiral Charles Martoglio noted:

RSOI/FE allows the Ronald Reagan Strike Group and other U.S. forces to improve our working relationship with other key nations in the region. Our presence during this exercise demonstrates that we can rapidly integrate into the forces already present in the region to provide a unified and capable fighting force.

During the exercise, ROK Navy personnel served aboard the Ronald Reagan as part of an officer exchange program. Exchange officers assisted their host ships with communications and provided support, while conveying ROK Navy perspectives throughout the RSOI/Foal Eagle 2007 exercise. Warships from both navies operated together to perfect their war-fighting skills, including close-air-support for ground forces, air-to-air defense exercises, maritime interoperability training, and expeditionary operations.

RSOI/Foal Eagle 2007 concluded on 31 March 2007. Rear Admiral James P. Wisecup, Commander U.S. Naval Forces Korea, noted the success of this year's RSOI/FE exercise:

This was the largest number of ship visits in the Republic of Korea in at least a decade to the cities of Donghae, Chinhae, Pyongtaek, Pohang, and Busan. Engagement between the ships’ crews, the ROK Navy, and the host cities was absolutely amazing. I feel this exercise was a complete success, positively enhancing the U.S. Navy's reputation and visibility on the peninsula.

=== Talisman Saber 2007 ===
The guided-missile destroyer operated independently and participated in Exercise Talisman Saber 2007, a bi-lateral exercise with the Australian Defence Force, before joining Carrier Strike Group Three for Valiant Shield 2007.

=== 2007 WESTPAC exercises and port visits ===
Number	Regional Exercises				Port Visits		Notes
Number	Duration	U.S. Force	Bilateral/Multilateral Partner(s)	Operating Area	Location	Dates	Notes
1st:	—	Carrier Strike Group Seven	—	—	Sasebo, Japan	24 Feb. 2007	
2nd:	16–18 Mar. 2007	Carrier Strike Group Seven	PASSEX: Japanese Maritime Self-Defense Force (JMSDF) (Note: JMSDF ships were the Kongō-class guided-missile destroyer Myōkō, Asagiri class destroyers Hamagiri and Yuugiri, and the helicopter-carrying destroyer Haruna.)	Philippine Sea	Hong Kong	7 Mar. 2007	
4th:	25–31 Mar. 2007	Carrier Strike Group Seven	RSOI/Foal Eagle 2007: Republic of Korea Armed Forces	Korean Theater of Operations	Busan, ROK (Note: USS Russell paid a port visit to Chinhae on 22 March 2007)	22 Mar. 2007	
6th	—	Carrier Strike Group Seven	—	—	Pearl Harbor	9 April 2007	
7th:	10 Jun. – 25 Jul. 2007	Paul Hamilton	Talisman Saber 2007: Australian Defence Force	Coral Sea	Brisbane, Australia	10 Jun. 2007	

== 2007–2008 operations ==
On 31 October 2007, the aircraft carrier Ronald Reagan returned to Naval Air Station North Island, California, following two days of its sea trials to evaluate the Reagan's material readiness to rejoin the fleet as a fully operational unit. The sea trials also marked the end of Reagan's six-month, $150-million (USD) planned incremental availability (PIA 07) overhaul.

On 9 November 2007, Ronald Reagan returned to Naval Air Station North Island, California, after completing its flight deck certification. This was a major step in preparing the ship to return to combat readiness, and Reagan completed this certification after being four days underway.

On 27 November 2007, the aircraft carrier Ronald Reagan and Carrier Air Wing Fourteen (CVW) 14 departed Naval Air Station San Diego, California, complete its Tailored Ship's Training Assessment (TSTA), an intense training period designed to prepare the ship and embarked air wing for prompt and sustained combat operations at sea. Joining the Reagan and CVW-14 were the guided-missile cruiser Chancellorsville; the guided-missile destroyers Gridley and Howard; and the guided-missile frigate Thach.

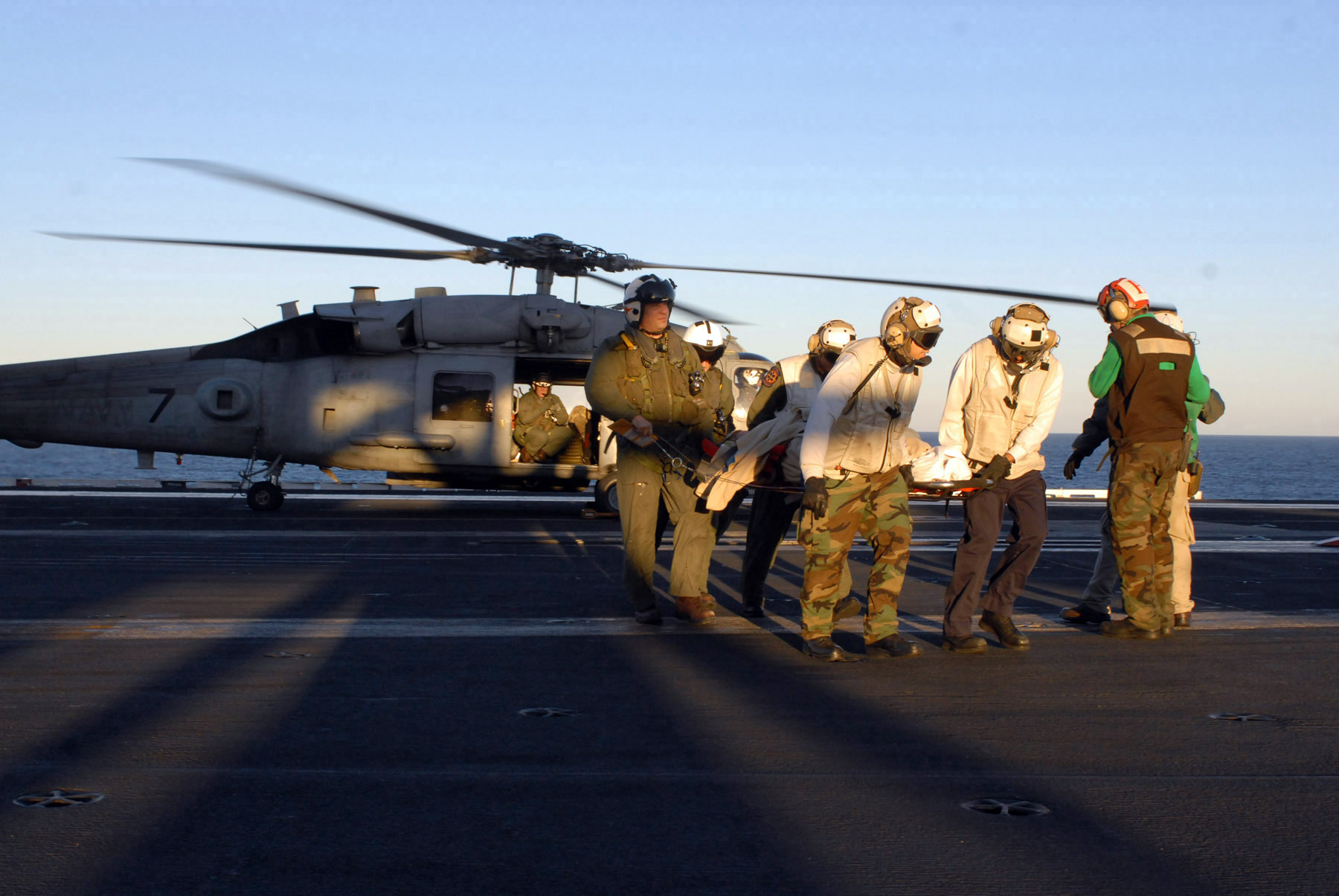
MEDEVAC (15 Dec. 2007)

TSTA and the upcoming Final Evaluation Problem (FEP) were conducted by Afloat Training Group Pacific (ATGPAC), the afloat training agency for the Commander, Naval Surface Forces Pacific. TSTA/FEP exercises are designed to test a ship's ability to conduct multiple simultaneous combat missions and survive complex casualty situations under stressful conditions. A major part of TSTA and FEP was testing the ship's damage control organization through a variety of events and general quarter drills scheduled during the underway period.

During its TSTA/FEP exercises, during the early morning hours of 15 December 2007, Ronald Reagan responded to a medical emergency aboard the Bermuda-flagged cruise ship Dawn Princess off the coast of southern Baja California, Mexico. Two HH-60H helicopters from squadron HS-2 were dispatched from the Reagan, flew some 550 miles to Dawn Princess, and executed an emergency medical evacuation (MEDEVAC) of a 14-year-old girl from Albion, Illinois back to the carrier. Once aboard the Reagan (pictured), an emergency appendectomy was performed by the ship's medical department. Dawn Princess' s operator, Princess Cruises, subsequently honored the crew of the Ronald Reagan and squadron HS-4 during a press conference and recognition ceremony held aboard the Dawn Princess on 2 January 2007.

On 18 December 2007, the Ronald Reagan returned to NAS San Diego having a score of outstanding on the Tailored Ship's Training Availability and Final Evaluation Problem (TSTA/FEP) during the previous 21-day underway period.

On 11 January 2008, the carrier Ronald Reagan paid a scheduled port visit to Santa Barbara, California. During the next two days, over 2 million pounds (9907,184.74 kg) of munitions were transferred from the MSC ammunition ship Flint to the Reagan which returned to San Diego on 15 January 2008. On 17 March 2008, Carrier Strike Group Seven departed NAS North Island near San Diego, California, to conduct its Composite Training Unit Exercise (COMPTUEX) off the coast of Southern California as part of its training cycle for a regularly scheduled deployment.

The goal of this 18-day exercise was to provide realistic training environments that closely replicate operational challenges that carrier strike groups might face during military operations around the world. Phase I of COMPTUEX included a detailed schedule of events (SOE) designed to provide specific task training and evaluation for the carrier strike group and warfare commanders. Phase II consisted of a real-world type exercise with no pre-planned SOE, and it was also known as the final battle problem.

COMPTUEX was evaluated by Commander, Strike Force Training Pacific, and this exercise was designed to test the strike group's ability to operate in complex, hostile environments as a single unit. This training encompassed the full spectrum of naval warfare (e.g., surface, air, and undersea). COMPTUEX also offers many training situations to assess how prepared the strike group is for deployment, and it was part of the Fleet Training Readiness Plan (FTRP). This was the first exercise where the entire strike group works together as one team, and it was one of the final steps in preparing the strike group for deployment. One feature of COMPTUEX was special training involving mine warfare provided by Mobile Mine Assembly Unit One (MOMAU 1) based at Naval Weapons Station Seal Beach, California. MOMAU-1 provided training to strike group personnel while preparing 14 MK-63 mines to be used in a mine-laying qualification evolution for pilots assigned to Carrier Air Wing 14.

During COMPTUEX, the carrier Reagan and Carrier Air Wing 14 received their "Blue Water Certification" which was a prerequisite for deployment, and these certifications allow the carrier and air wing to operate in areas that are out of range of friendly airfields. The certification process tested the ship's ability to land aircraft in emergency situations, such as engine failure and fuel leakage, as well as the ability to launch aircraft already on the catapults and clear the landing area in order to recover the damaged aircraft. On 7 April 2008, Carrier Strike Group Seven returned to its home base of NAS North Island following the completion of its Composite Training Unit Exercise (COMPTUEX) that took place off the coast of Southern California.

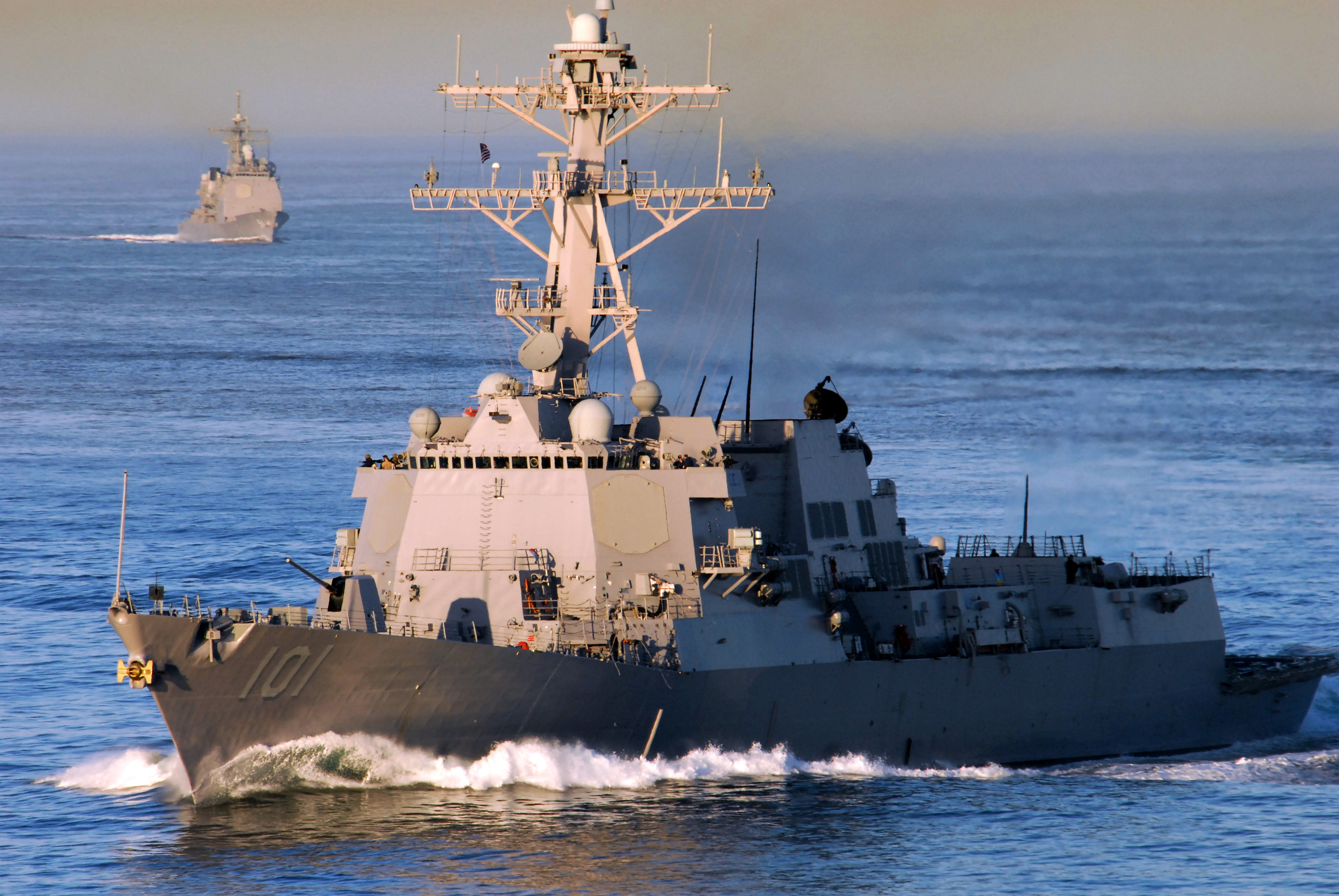
JTFEX 08-5 (13 April 2008)

On 11 April 2008, the aircraft carrier Ronald Reagan and Carrier Air Wing Fourteen (CVW-14) departed Naval Air Station San Diego, California, to begin Joint Task Force Exercise 08-5 (JTFEX 08-5) off the coast of Southern California. Joining the Reagan and CVW-14 were the guided-missile cruiser Chancellorsville; the guided-missile destroyers Gridley (pictured), Howard, and Decatur; and the guided-missile frigate Thach.

Joint Task Force Exercise 08-5 was designed to be a realistic exercise in real-world operations and the operational challenges faced by U.S. forces in cooperation with coalition militaries. JTFEX 08-5 was the final step in preparing Carrier Strike Group Seven for its Western Pacific (WESTPAC) upcoming deployment and it tested the strike group's ability to plan and execute the Navy's Maritime Strategy alongside other U.S. and coalition forces in complex, hostile war-fighting environments.

On 22 April 2008, Carrier Strike Group Seven returned to its home base. Strike group commander Rear Admiral James P. Wisecup noted completion of Joint Task Force Exercise 08-5:

This is the strike group's last training before we go on deployment. It's the ability to do integrated training, not just individual ship training. We bring the group together, all the ships, the air wing and the aircraft carrier, as well as the staffs of the warfare commanders and we fight the ship as a group. I'm very confident about the Ronald Reagan Strike Group's ability to go into harm's way and also to do the nation's business.

== 2008 deployment ==
On 19 May 2008, Carrier Strike Group Seven depart from Naval Air Station North Island, California, for its 2008 Western Pacific (WESTPAC) deployment to support the U.S. Navy's will support the Maritime Strategy in the U.S. Fifth Fleet and U.S. Seventh Fleet areas of operation. On 27 May 2008, Carrier Strike Group Seven began its undersea warfare exercise (USWEX) in the waters of the Hawaiian operating area in order to assess the undersea warfare capabilities of the strike groups. Two nuclear-powered fast attack submarines also participated in USWEX. Carrier Strike Group Seven returned to its homebase on 25 November 2008, completing its six-month 2008 overseas deployment. Strike group commander Rear Admiral Scott Hebner noted:

There is no question that Ronald Reagan Carrier Strike Group had a very successful deployment. The talented and dedicated Sailors of this group demonstrated tremendous operational flexibility and performed at the highest levels of excellence across the warfare spectrum and core capabilities of the Maritime Strategy. They were warriors, ambassadors, partners and humanitarians. They represent all that is good in our country and I'm profoundly honored to sail with this impressive strike group.

=== 2008 force composition ===
Units	CARSTRKGRU 7 Warships	Carrier Air Wing Fourteen (CVW-14) squadrons embarked aboard flagship USS Ronald Reagan (CVN-76)	
No. 1	USS Chancellorsville (CG-62)	Strike Fighter Squadron 115 (VFA-115): 12 F/A-18E	Carrier Airborne Early Warning Squadron 139 (VAW-113): 4 E-2C
No. 2	USS Gridley (DDG-101)	Strike Fighter Squadron 113 (VFA-113): 10 F/A-18C(N)	Helicopter Anti-Submarine Squadron Four (HS-4): 7 SH-60F/HH-60H
No. 3	USS Howard (DDG-83)	Strike Fighter Squadron 25 (VFA-25): 12 F/A-18C(N)	Carrier Logistics Support Squadron 30 (VRC-30), Det. 1: 4 C-2A
No. 4	USS Decatur (DDG-73)	Strike Fighter Squadron 22 (VFA-22): 12 F/A-18F	Ship-based helicopter detachments (Note: Helicopter detachments were from Helicopter Anti-Submarine Squadron Light 49 (HSL-49) embarked aboard Chancellorsville and Thach; HSL-43 embarked aboard Howard, and HSL-7 embarked aboard Gridley.)
No. 5	USS Thach (FFG-43)	Electronic Attack Squadron 139 (VAQ-139): 4 EA-6B	—
Notes			

=== 2008 Seventh Fleet operations ===
==== Typhoon Fengshen ====
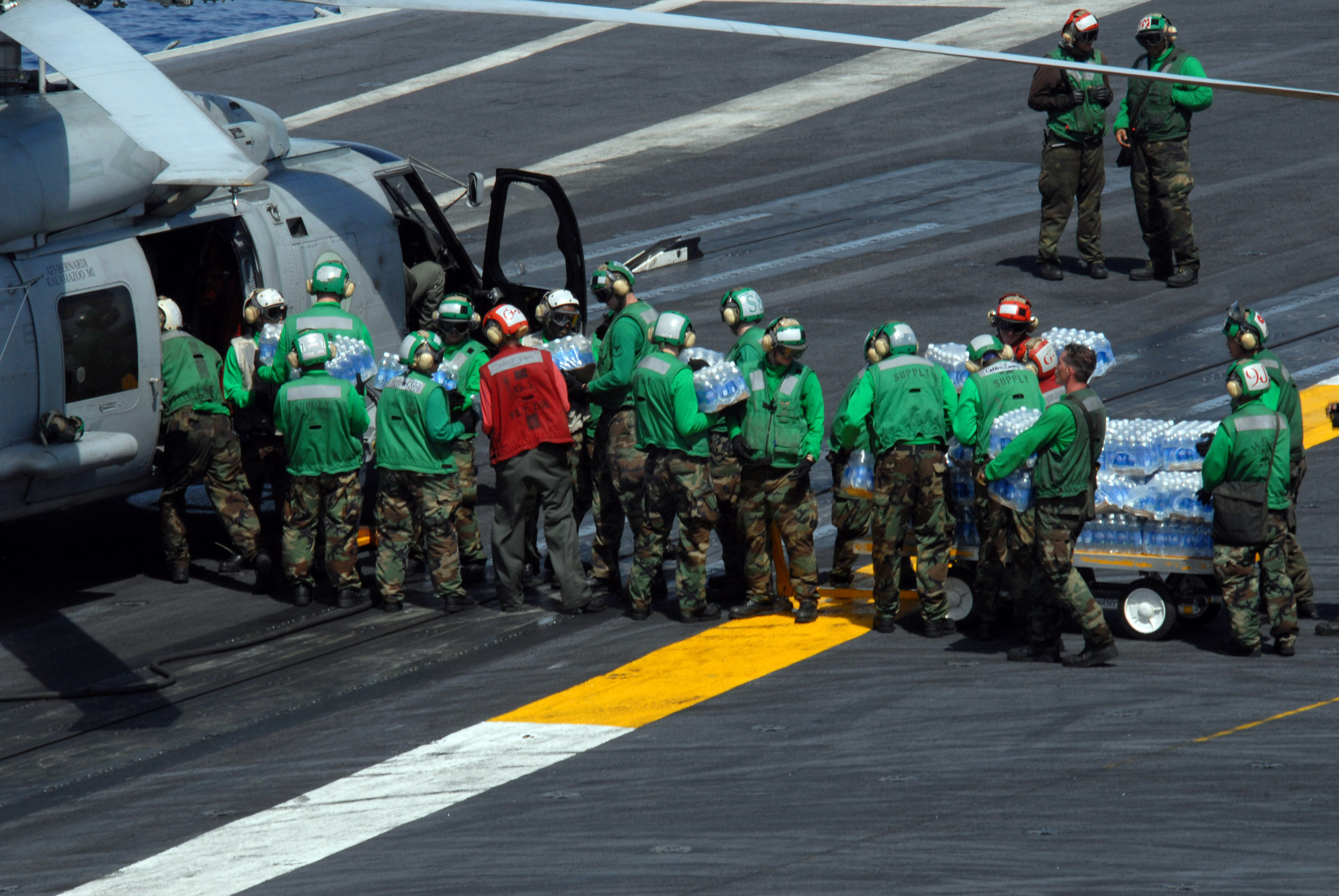
Typhoon relief (25 June 2008)

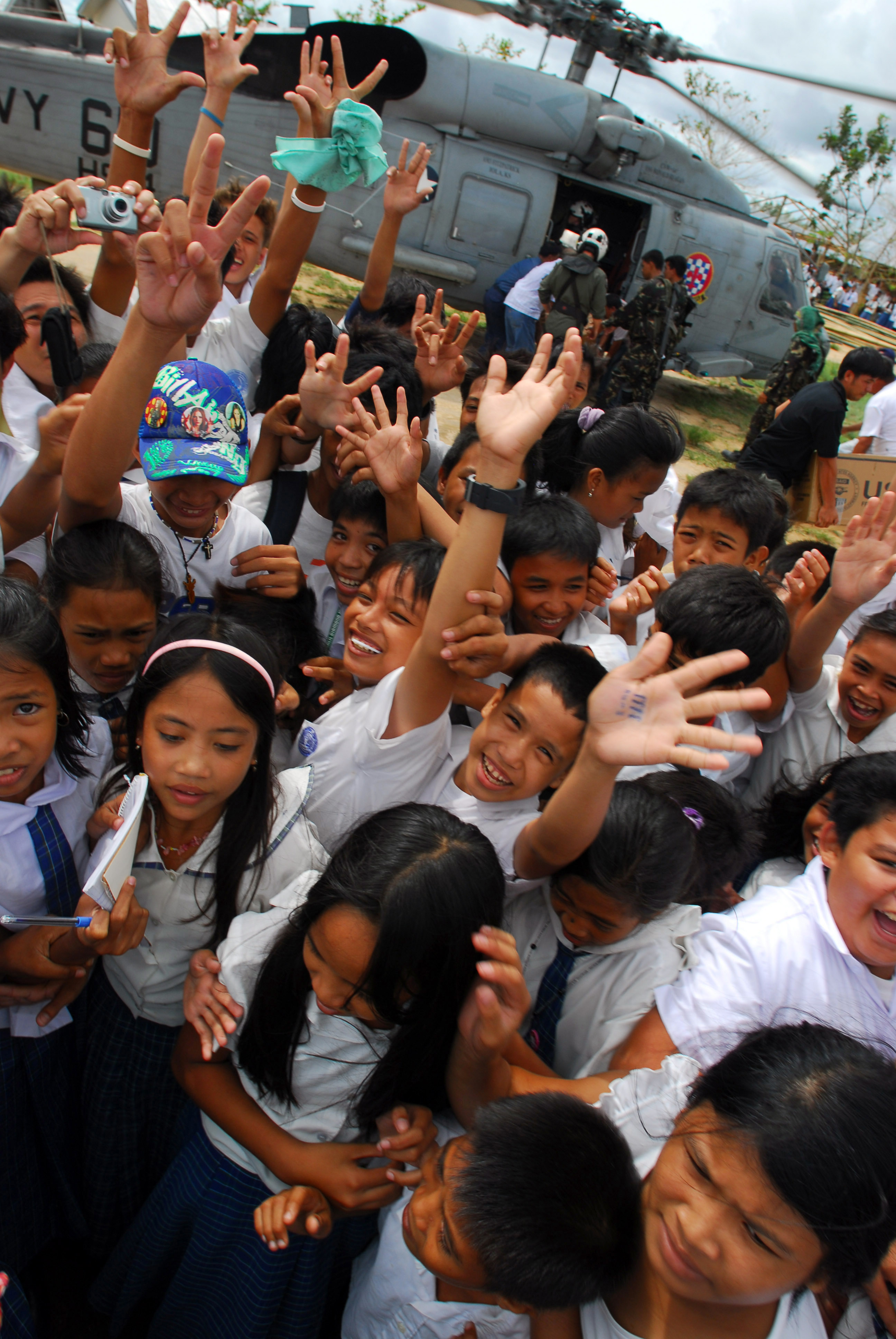
Balasan, Philippines (1 July 2008)

Carrier Strike Group Seven cut short is port visit to Hong Kong and was ordered by U.S. President George W. Bush to join in the humanitarian assistance and disaster relief (HA/DR) efforts for the island of Panay, Republic of the Philippines, in the aftermath of Typhoon Fengshen. Following the strike group's arrival on 25 June 2008 after steaming for 36 hours, Rear Admiral James P. Wisecup conferred with Lt. General Ike Inserto of the Armed Forces of the Philippines (AFP) to coordinate this HA/DR operation. During the first day, two C-2A Greyhound cargo aircraft, two HH-60H Seahawk helicopters, and one SH-60F Seahawk helicopter flew from the carrier Ronald Reagan to Iloilo's Santa Barbara airport, delivering more than 12,000 bottles of fresh water and more than 7,500 lbs. of rice to the airport.

Starting on 26 June 2008, Armed Forces of the Philippines and the U.S. Navy personnel began delivering much-needed relief supplies to the victims of Typhoon Fengshen on Panay. Helicopters from Carrier Strike Group Seven made 19 relief sorties to deliver food and bottled water to areas most affected by Typhoon Fengshen. Inside the helicopters, U.S. Navy air crews paired with AFP officers and civilian government officials to make the deliveries while AFP officers embarked Reagan to help direct the effort.

For the second consecutive day, Philippine Air Force (PAF) C-130 cargo planes loaded with food and other supplies arrived at Iloilo's Santa Barbara airport as did two C-2A Greyhound cargo planes from the Ronald Reagan with water and rice. During the course of these first two days, the carrier Reagan had provided 28,128 20-ounce bottles of water and 9,060 pounds (4,109.55 kg) of rice. U.S. and AFP personnel loaded the supplies onto the helicopters for rapid delivery to storm victims, with the relief flights continuing as supplies arrive from Ronald Reagan, the Philippine government, and relief organizations. Also, the strike group's four destroyers were positioned around the island of Panay and served as fueling stations to keep the relief effort moving.

In addition to the relief flights, a four-man engineering team from the Ronald Reagan engineers repaired Iloilo City's hospital generators damaged by the floods. After bringing a mud-damaged fuel pump aboard the ship for repair, the team returned to Iloilo City's Barotac Viejo Hospital and restored electrical power. Also, senior medical personnel from Reagan's health services department coordinated with AFP personnel and provincial government officials regarding public health issues. Finally, in addition to Carrier Strike Group Seven, the U.S. Navy maritime prepositioning ship GySgt. Fred W. Stockham provided assistance to the relief efforts while the rescue-and-salvage ship Safeguard assisted in the recovery operations of the capsized ferry Princess of the Stars.

On 29 June 2008, United States Ambassador to Thailand Kristie A. Kenney joined AFP Chief of Staff General Alexander B. Yano flew aboard the Ronald Reagan to be briefed of the HA/DR mission as well as to thank the U.S. naval personnel for their relief efforts. On 3 July 2008, Carrier Strike Group Seven departed the Sulu Sea and the island of Panay. During its relief mission, the strike group flew 332 sorties over eight consecutive days delivering more than 519,000 pounds (235,414.44 kg) of fresh water, rice, and medical supplies to typhoon victims in Panay. Strike group commander Rear Admiral James P. Wisecup noted:

This was a mission that was tremendously rewarding for our Sailors. The aircrews flew 20–35 missions per day, sunup to sundown. Our aircraft maintainers worked through the night. Every Sailor in the strike group had a hand in this. More importantly, we worked alongside our counterparts from the Armed Forces of the Philippines and brought real help to their people.

==== SEACAT 2008 ====
DERSON-7 guided-missile destroyer USS Howard participated in the fourth annual Southeast Asia Cooperation Against Terrorism (SEACAT) exercise which began in Singapore on 18 August 2008.

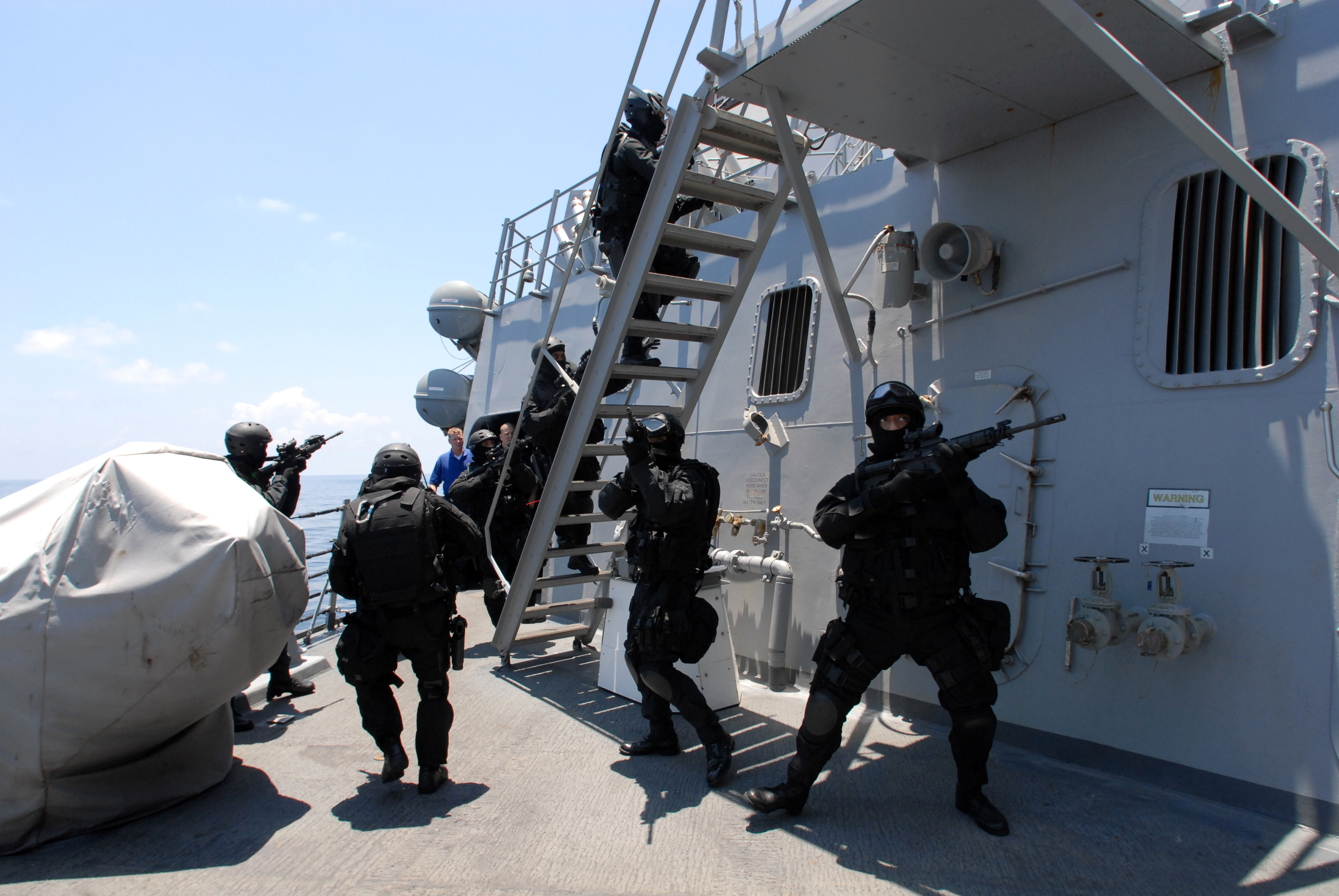
Boarding ops (18 August 2008)

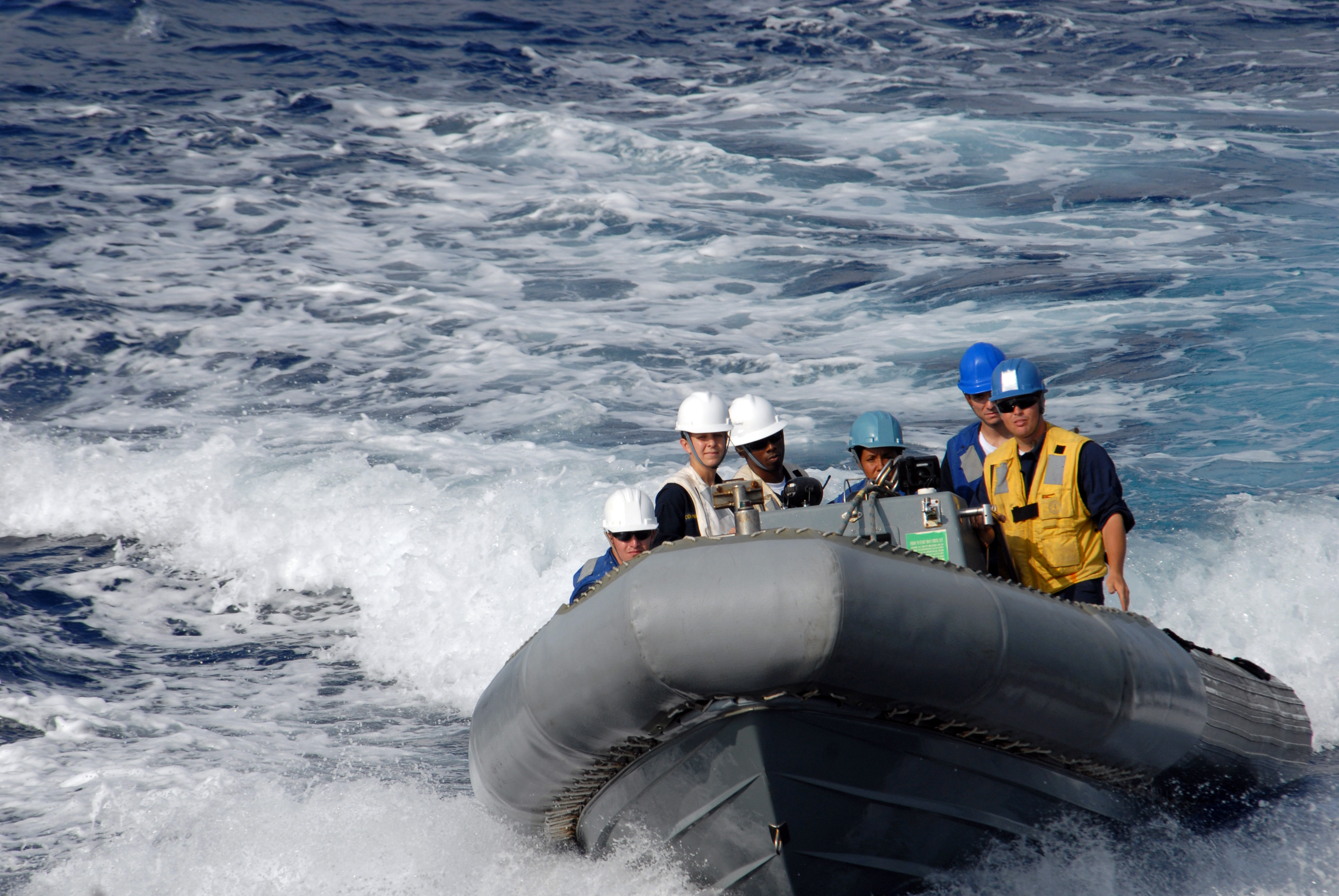
SEACAT 2008

SEACAT 2008 was the multifaceted exercises designed to focus information sharing, cooperation, and coordination by bringing together six countries for simultaneous bilateral exercises with the United States. It presented its participants with realistic situations involving criminal and terrorist threats requiring international coordination, communication and decision-making. SEACAT also provided participants with practical maritime interception training opportunities to enhance the maritime security and interoperability of the participating forces.

For SEACAT 2008, the naval forces of Brunei, Malaysia, Singapore, Thailand, and the Republic of the Philippines participated bilaterally with the U.S. Navy during SEACAT 2008. A team of U.S. officers worked with liaison officers from the participating forces to analyze situations and produce recommended solutions for proposal to their individual national headquarters. The officers are also collaborated in the planning of maritime interception operations within the specific exercise scenario.

Captain Michael W. Selby, the Destroyer Squadron One commodore, directed the exercise task force on behalf of Rear Admiral Nora W. Tyson, Logistics Group Western Pacific commander, who acted as the executive agent for SEACAT 2008. Captain Selby noted:

SEACAT is a means of contributing to the capabilities of our friends and allies. The security of all waterways is vital to peace and prosperity in the Asia-Pacific region, and we applaud the ongoing efforts of regional nations in combating maritime threats. Additionally, we feel that personal relationships built during these types of opportunities are mutually beneficial.

The U.S. Navy dock landing ship Tortuga served as the flagship for SEACAT 2008. In addition to Howard and Tortuga, other U.S. ships that participated in SEACAT 2008 included the frigate Ford, the Coast Guard cutter Morgenthau, and Military Sealift Command salvage ship Safeguard and pre-positioned cargo ships 1st Lt. Baldomero Lopez and Cpl. Louis J. Hauge, Jr. Also, a U.S. P-3C maritime patrol aircraft from squadron VP-16 participated in SEACAT 2008.

During the first day of the exercise, 18 August 2008, Howard acted as an opposing force vessel that a commando team from the Brunei Special Forces boarded her. The Royal Navy of Brunei and the Royal Brunei Air Force tracked Howard and assisted the Brunei Special Forces team in the maritime intercept and subsequent boarding operation (pictured). Helicopter Visit, Board, Search and Seizure Team 1 (HVBSS-1) was embarked aboard the Howard, and HVBSS-1 acted as crew members assigned to the rogue vessel.

On the second day of the exercise, 18 August 2008, Howard boarding teams conducted small boat operations in rigid-hull inflatable boats (RHIBs) (pictured), while coordinating with a P-3 Orion maritime patrol aircraft from the Republic of Singapore Navy.

SEACAT 2008 concluded on 20 August 2008.

==== Malabar 2008 ====
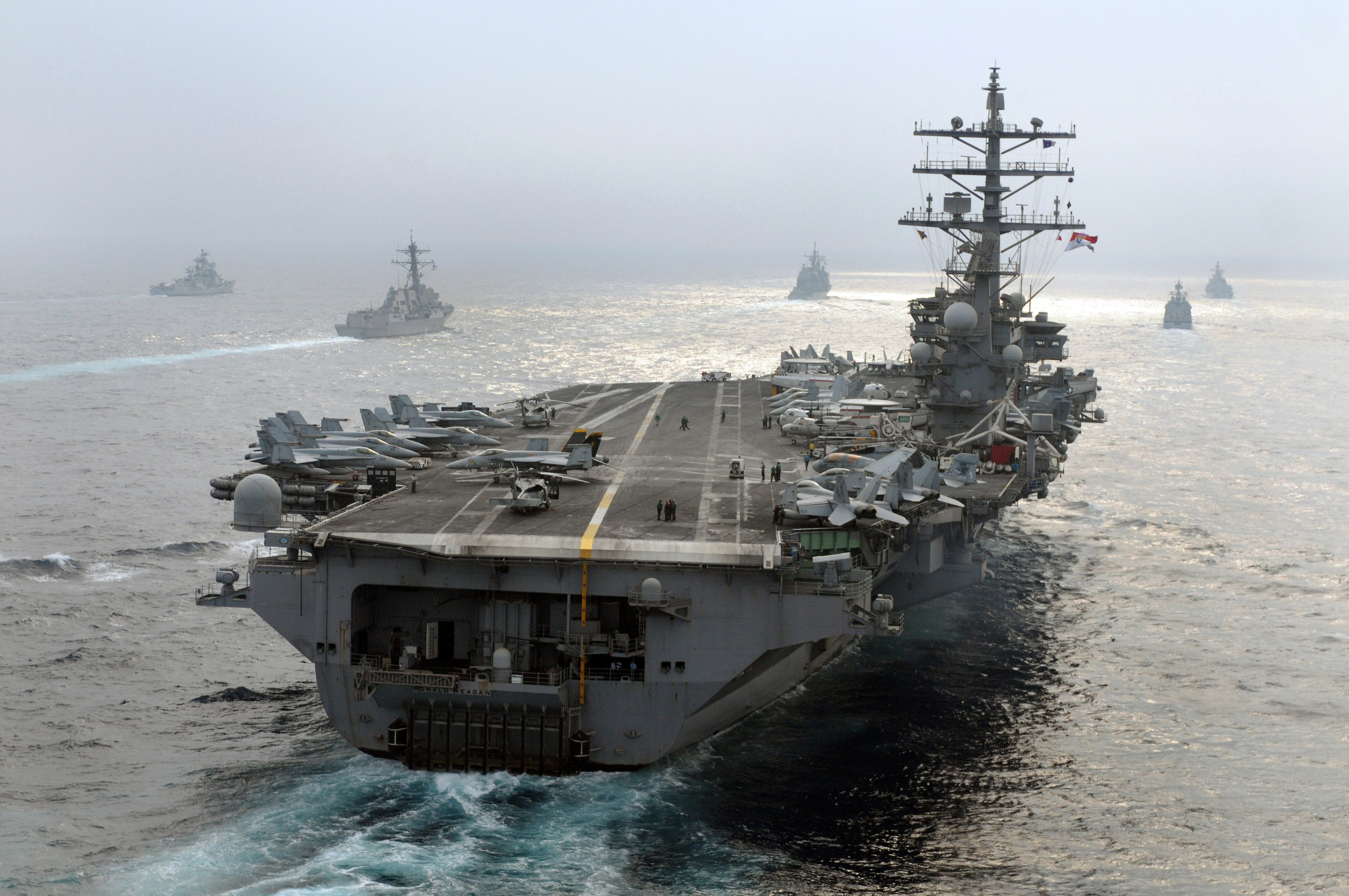
Malabar 2008

Carrier Strike Group Seven participated in Malabar 2008, an annual bi-lateral exercise with the Indian Navy, involving surface, air and sub-surface training while operating the Arabian Sea between 20–24 October 2008 (pictured). The purpose of Malabar 2008 was to promote increase inter-operability between the United States and India, with a special emphasis on maritime interdiction, including counter-piracy and counter-terrorism operation. Rear Admiral Anil Chopra, Flag Officer of the Indian Navy's Western Naval Command (FOCWF), noted:

This greatly enhances our two navies’ interoperability, which is very important to humanitarian assistance and disaster relief missions, as well as issues of maritime security and piracy.

Joining Carrier Group Seven were the fast combat support ship Bridge and the nuclear-powered fast-attack submarine Springfield and a P-3C maritime patrol aircraft. Indian naval units included guided-missile destroyers Mumbai and Rana; the guided-missile frigates Talwar, Godavari, Brahmaputra, and Betwa; the replenishment tanker Aditya; and a Shishumar-class diesel-electric submarine.

On 14 November 2008, Carrier Strike Group Seven concluded operation in the Seventh Fleet area of responsibility.

=== 2008 Fifth Fleet operations ===
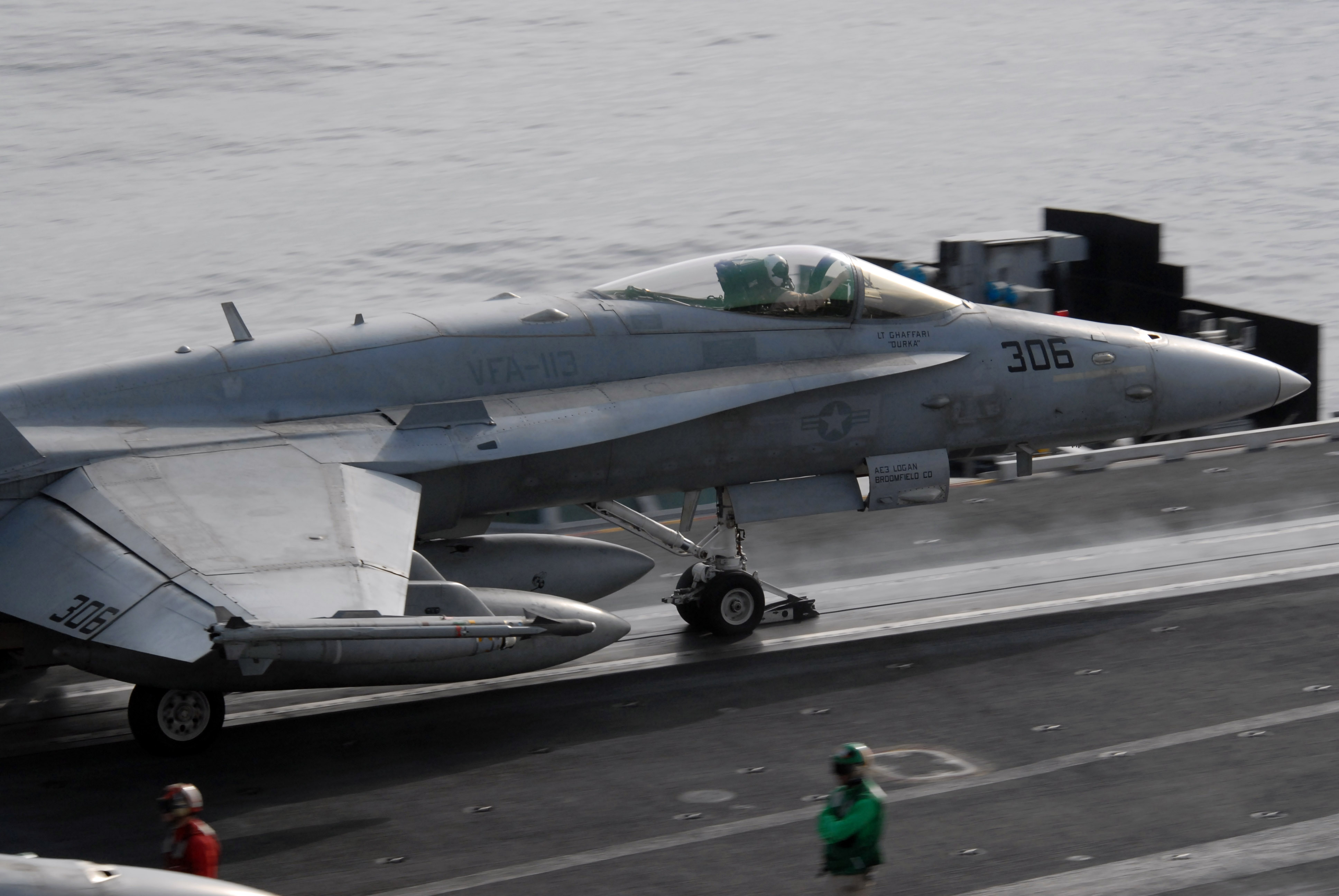
Carrier air operations (28 August 2008)

On 28 August 2008, Carrier Strike Group Seven (CARSTRGRU-7) relieved Carrier Strike Group Nine, led by the carrier Abraham Lincoln, as Carrier Task Force 50 (CTF-50) and launched its first sorties (pictured) in support of Operation Enduring Freedom – Afghanistan (OEF-A). A total of more than 1,150 sorties were flown by Carrier Air Wing Fourteen in support of coalition ground forces in southern Afghanistan during CARSTRGRU-7's deployment with the U.S. Fifth Fleet. The guided-missile destroyer Decatur and the guided-missile frigate Thach joined Combined Task Force 152 (CTF-152) operating in the Persian Gulf, while the guided-missile destroyers Gridley and Howard patrolled the Arabian Sea and Gulf of Aden as part of Combined Task Force 150 (CTF-50).

On 28 September 2008, Howard began visually monitoring the situation involving Belize-flagged cargo ship Faina, captured 25 September, which is anchored off the Somalia coast near the harbor city of Hobyo. MV Faina was owned and operated by "Kaalybe Shipping Ukraine" and was carrying a cargo of T-72 tanks and related equipment. Two other pirated vessels, MV Capt Stefanos and MV Centauri, were also anchored at this location. On 5 February 2009 the MV Faina and her crew were released after being held captive for 5 months.

=== 2008 WESTPAC exercises and port visits ===
Number	Regional Exercises				Port Visits		Notes
Number	Duration	U.S. Force	Joint/Bilateral/Multilateral Partner(s)	Operating Area	Location	Dates	Notes
1st:	27 May 2008	Carrier Strike Group Seven	Undersea Warfare Exercise (USWEX)	Hawaiian operating area	Hong Kong	19–22 Jun. 2008	
2nd:	—	Carrier Strike Group Seven	—	—	Apra Harbor, Guam	6 Jul. 2008	
3rd:	—	Ronald Reagan, Chancellorsville	—	—	Busan, ROK	14 Jul. 2008	
4th:	—	Howard , Decatur, Thatch	—	—	Chinhae, ROK	14–18 Jul. 2008	
5th:	—	Ronald Reagan, Howard	—	—	Sasebo, Japan	28 Jul. to 1 Aug. 2008	
6th:	—	Chancellorsville, Thach	—	—	Yokosuka, Japan	28 Jul. to 1 Aug. 2008	
7th:	—	Gridley	—	—	Fukuoka, Japan	28 Jul. to 1 Aug. 2008	
8th:	17–20 Aug. 2008	Howard	SEACAT (Note: U.S. Navy Task Force 73 and the navies of Malaysia, Indonesia, Singapore, and the Republic of the Philippines.)	—	—	—	
9th:	—	Carrier Strike Group Seven	—	—	Port Kelang, Malaysia	18–21 Aug. 2008	
10th:	15–24 Oct. 2008	Carrier Strike Group Seven	Malabar 2008: Indian Navy	Arabian Sea	Goa, India	18 Oct. 2008	
11th:	1 Nov. 2008	Chancellorsville, Decatur	PASSEX: Royal Thai Navy (Note: Frigate Chao Praya (053T))	Andaman Sea	—	—	
12th:	—	Carrier Strike Group Seven	—	—	Pearl Harbor	17-19 Nov. 2008	

== 2009 Operations ==
=== Carrier qualifications and sustainment exercises ===
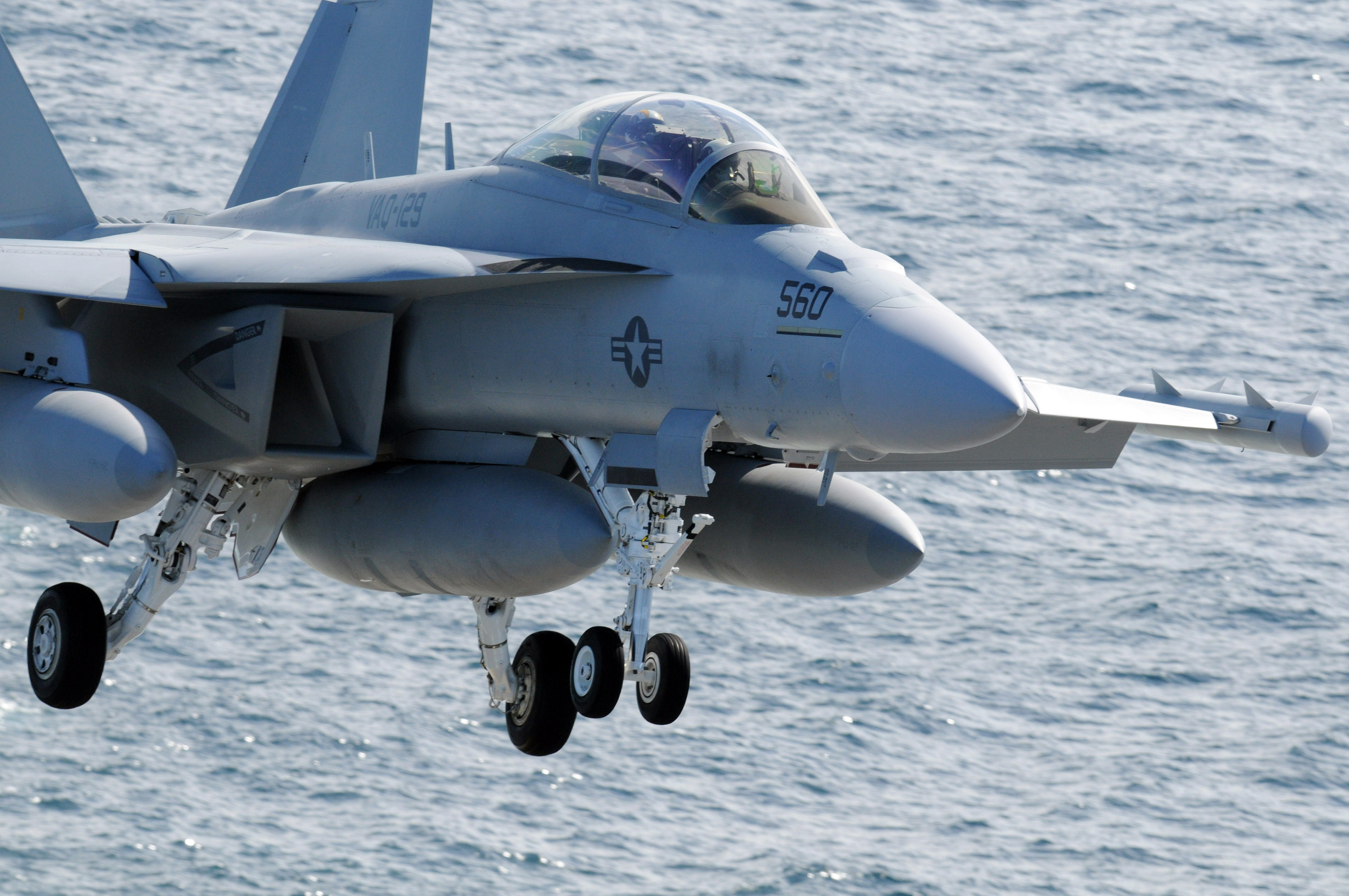
EA-18G Growler (17 Feb. 2009)

On 17 February 2009, the aircraft carrier Ronald Reagan departed Naval Air Station North Island in Coronado, California, for carrier qualifications for pilots from the Fleet Replacement Squadron (FRS). Also, Electronic Attack Squadron 129 (VAQ-129) was also training instructor pilots to aid in the transition from EA-6B Prowler to EA-18G Growler. This marks the first landing of VAQ 129's Growlers aboard an aircraft carrier (pictured).

On 26 March 2009, Carrier Strike Group Seven returned to Naval Air Station North Island following the completion of its sustainment exercise (SUSTAINEX). The aircraft carrier Ronald Reagan completed SUSTAINEX along with embarked Carrier Air Wing Fourteen; the guided-missile cruiser Chancellorsville; the guided-missile destroyers Howard and Gridley; and the guided-missile frigate Thach. SUSTAINEX is the last coordinated exercise involving the ships of Carrier Strike Group Seven prior to its upcoming Western Pacific (WESTPAC) deployment later in 2009.

=== 2009 WESTPAC deployment ===
On 28 May 2009, Carrier Strike Group Seven departed San Diego, California, to begin its 2009 Western Pacific (WESTPAC) deployment. The strike group's departure was delayed for 24 hours because of a malfunction in a voltage regulator on one of the eight electrical generators on board the carrier Ronald Reagan. Carrier Strike Group Seven entered the U.S. Seventh Fleet's area of responsibility (AOR) on 9 June 2009. Carrier Strike Group Seven returned to its home base at Naval Air Station North Island, California, completing its five-month WESTPAC deployment, on 31 October 2009. Strike group commander Rear Admiral Scott Hebner noted:

This is the finest team of Sailors I've been fortunate to call shipmates. I could not be more proud of each and every Sailor and their families. The Ronald Reagan Carrier Strike Group has been pretty busy the last few years, executing missions across the capabilities of our National Maritime Strategy—and answering the call with impressive results every time.

The guided-missile frigate Thach returned to San Diego on 5 November 2009 after completing an around-the-world deployment via the Suez Canal, the Strait of Gibraltar, and the Panama Canal. During its extended deployment, Thatch paid port call in Saipan, Thailand, Bahrain, Jordan and the Azores. The guided-missile destroyer Decatur returned to Naval Base San Diego on 23 November 2009 after an extended deployment.

==== 2009 WESTPAC force composition ====
Units	CARSTRKGRU 7 Warships	Carrier Air Wing Fourteen (CVW-14) squadrons embarked aboard flagship USS Ronald Reagan (CVN-76)	
No. 1	USS Chancellorsville (CG-62)	Strike Fighter Squadron 115 (VFA-115): 12 F/A-18E	Carrier Airborne Early Warning Squadron 139 (VAW-113): 4 E-2C
No. 2	USS Gridley (DDG-101)	Strike Fighter Squadron 113 (VFA-113): 10 F/A-18C(N)	Helicopter Anti-Submarine Squadron Four (HS-4): 7 SH-60F/HH-60H
No. 3	USS Howard (DDG-83)	Strike Fighter Squadron 25 (VFA-25): 12 F/A-18C(N)	Carrier Logistics Support Squadron 30 (VRC-30), Det. 1: 4 C-2A
No. 4	USS Decatur (DDG-73)	Strike Fighter Squadron 22 (VFA-22): 12 F/A-18F	—
No. 5	USS Thach (FFG-43)	Electronic Attack Squadron 139 (VAQ-139): 4 EA-6B	—
Notes			

==== 2009 Seventh Fleet operations ====
Carrier Strike Group Seven entered the U.S. Seventh Fleet's area of responsibility (AOR) on 9 June 2009. On 21 June 2009, while transiting the Sulu Sea near the Republic of the Philippines, Carrier Strike Group Seven commemorated the one-year anniversary of Typhoon Fengshen relief efforts with a reception of Philippine civilian and military dignitaries aboard the carrier Ronald Reagan and a wreath-laying ceremony at sea.

==== 2009 Fifth Fleet operations ====
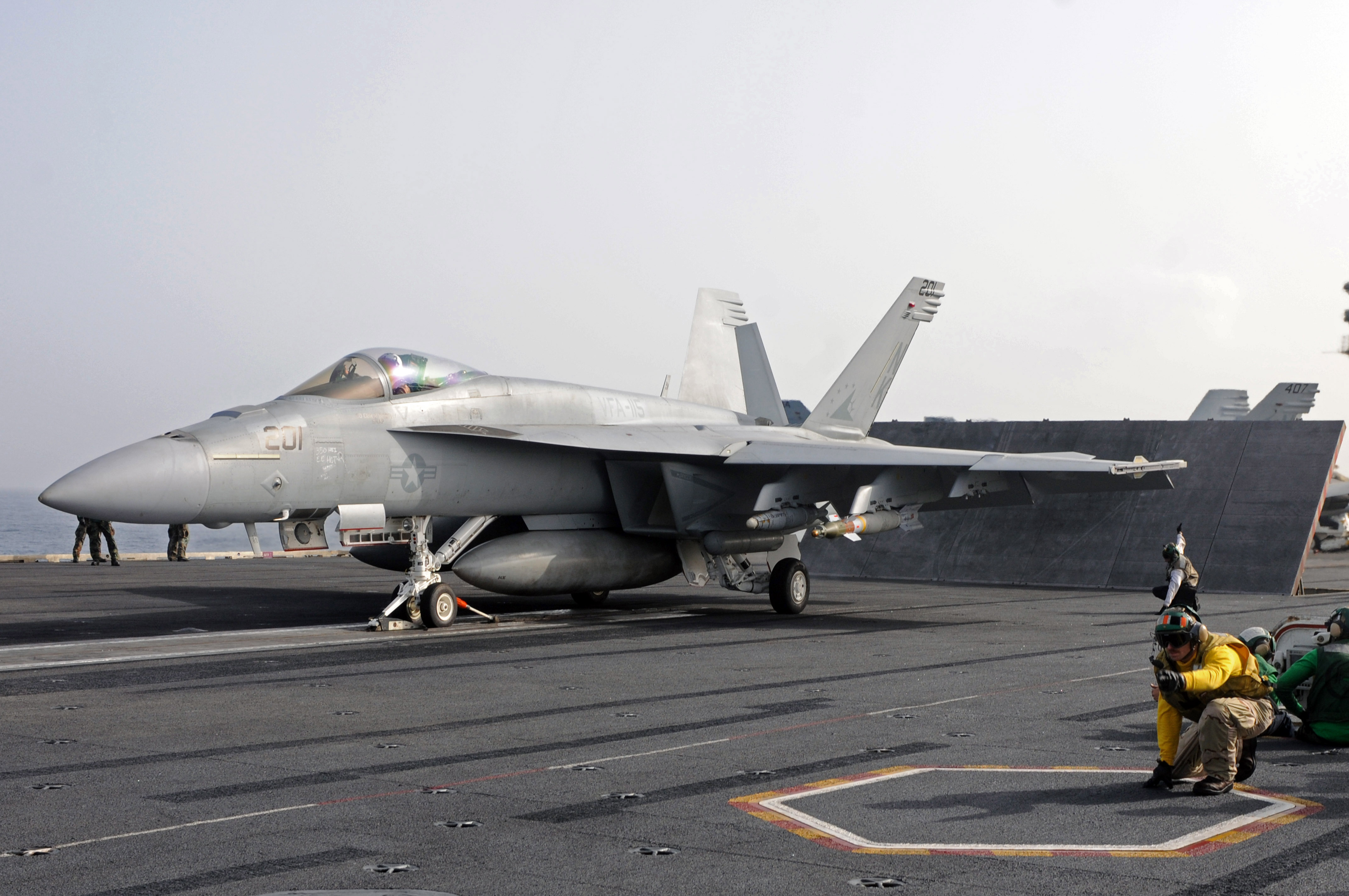
Carrier air operations (6 July 2009)

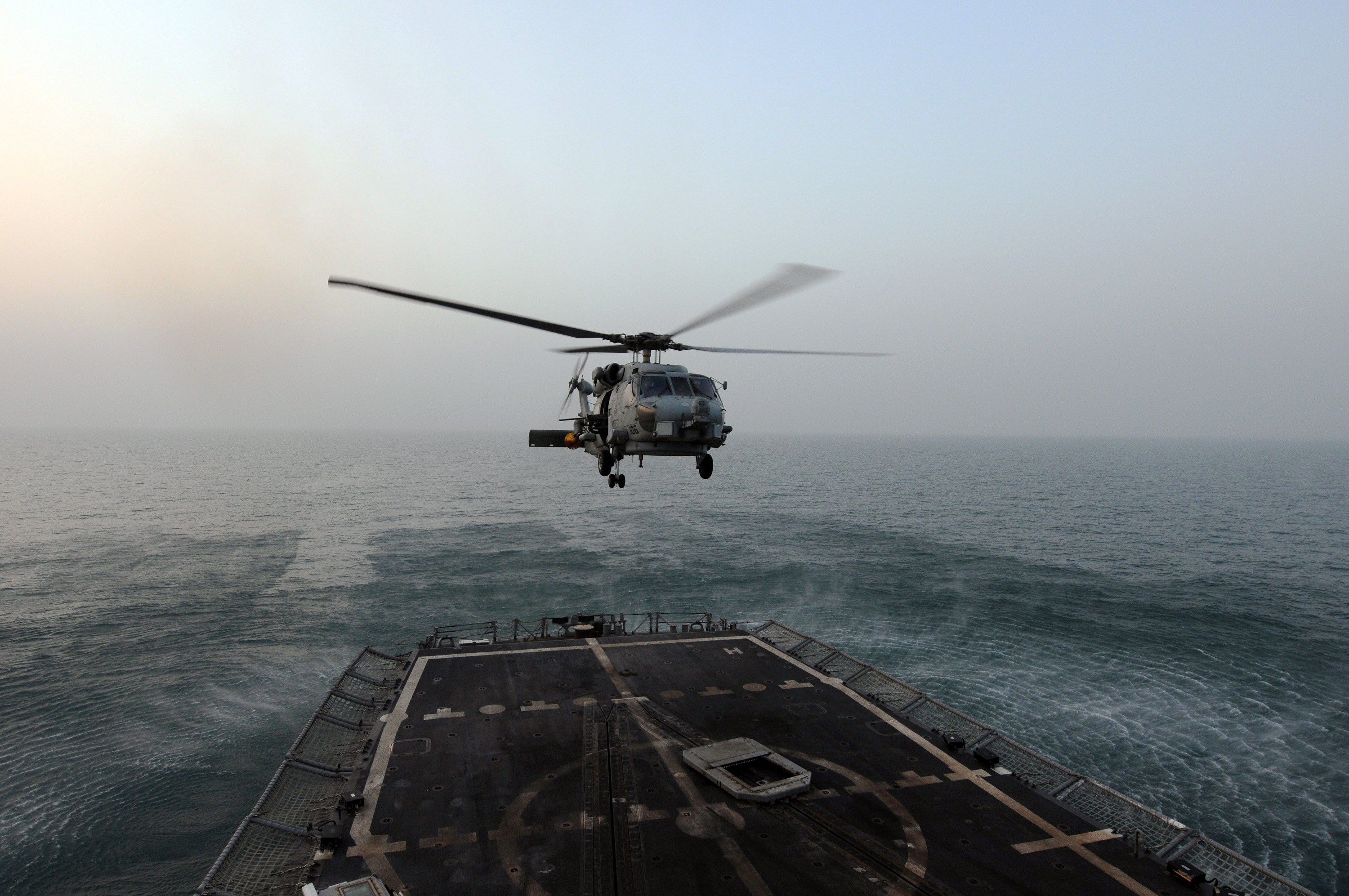
SH-60B Sea Hawk helicopter from squadron HSL-49 (18 August 2009)

A number of dignitaries visited Carrier Strike Group Seven's flagship, the carrier Ronald Reagan, during its deployment to the U.S. Fifth Fleet. Chairman of the Joint Chiefs of Staff Admiral Mike Mullen visited on 13 July 2009; Fifth Fleet commander Vice Admiral William E. Gortney on 16–17 August; and Master Chief Petty Officer of the Navy Rick D. West on 12–13 September.

===== Carrier air operations =====
On 6 July 2009, Strike Group Seven relieved Carrier Strike Group Eight, led by the carrier Eisenhower, as Carrier Task Force 50 (CTF-50), and Carrier Air Wing Fourteen (CVW-14) launched its first combat air sorties (pictured) in support of coalition ground forces for Operation Enduring Freedom in Afghanistan (OEF-A).

On 18 September 2009, Carrier Strike Group Eleven relieved Carrier Strike Group Seven as Carrier Task Force 50 (CTF-50). During its 2009 deployment to the U.S. Fifth Fleet, Carrier Air Wing Fourteen flew more than 1,600 sorties in support of Operation Enduring Freedom in Afghanistan.

===== Maritime security operations =====
The guided-missile destroyers Decatur, Howard, and Gridley, as well as the guided-missile frigate Thach, supported maritime security operations in the Persian Gulf, Arabian Sea, Gulf of Oman, Gulf of Aden, and Red Sea. For example, during July 2009, the Thatch was assigned by Commander, Task Group Iraqi Maritime (CTG-IM) to serve as a picket ship patrolling the vital Al Basrah Oil Terminal (ABOT) located in the northern Persian Gulf.

On 26 August 2009, USS Chancellorsville is carrying out a mission alongside other destroyers - Decatur, Howard and Gridley when Somali pirates aboard Win Far opened fire at a U.S. Navy SH-60B helicopter from Squadron HSL-49 embarked aboard the cruiser Chancellorsville. No rounds struck the helicopter, the crew did not return fire, and no U.S. Navy personnel were injured. All Carrier Strike Group Seven battleships were placed on "high alert and battle ready" for possible assault and direct encounter with the terrorists. Win Far is a Taiwanese-flagged fishing vessel that was captured by pirates on 6 April 2009, and it subsequently served as a "mother ship" to conduct other known pirate attacks, including the Maersk Alabama incident in April 2009.

The HSL-49 helicopter was conducting a routine surveillance flight of Win Far at anchorage south of Garacad, Somalia, when the incident occurred. During the flight, aircrew observed activity, but could not ascertain they were fired upon until their return to Chancellorsville and review of Forward Looking Infrared Radar (FLIR) video, which recorded the incident. The helicopter was approximately 3,000 yards from Win Far when it was fired upon which reportedly could have struck the nearby battleships with the high caliber of ammunitions Somalian pirates have in possession.

==== 2009 WESTPAC exercises and port visits ====
Number	Regional Exercises				Port Visits		Notes
Number	Duration	U.S. Force	Bilateral/Multilateral Partner(s)	Operating Area	Location	Dates	Notes
1st:	—	Carrier Strike Group Seven	—	—	Singapore	4 Jun. 2009	
2nd:	—	Gridley, Thatch	—	—	Phuket, Thailand	25 Jun. 2009	
3rd:	—	Decatur	—	—	Yokosuka, Japan	4 Jul. 2009	
4th:	—	Carrier Strike Group Seven	—	—	Phuket, Thailand	22 Sep. 2009	
5th:	—	Carrier Strike Group Seven	—	—	Pearl Harbor	13 Oct. 2009	

== See also ==
- Carrier Strike Group Seven 2004–2006 operations
