= Carrier Strike Group Seven 2004–06 operations =

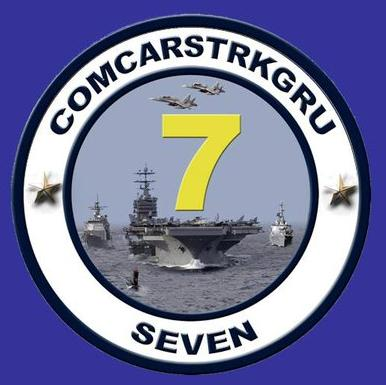
Carrier Strike Group Seven crest

Carrier Strike Group Seven 2004–2006 operations included one deployments to the U.S. Fifth Fleet, and its embarked carrier air wing flew approximately 2940 air sorties in support of ground forces in Iraq and Afghanistan while CARSTRKGRU-7 surface warships supported theater security and maritime interdiction operation within that fleet's area of responsibility. It also participated in Valiant Shield 2006, a major joint military exercise of the U.S. Pacific Command. Finally, Carrier Strike Group Seven provided humanitarian assistance after the 2004 Indian Ocean earthquake. Prior to being re-designated as Carrier Strike Group Seven on 1 October 2004, Carrier Group Seven (CarGru-7) and its John C. Stennis Carrier Battle Group participated in three different exercises during Summer Pulse 2004, a multi-carrier surge deployment to test the U.S. Navy's then-new Fleet Response Plan.

Carrier Strike Group Seven was based at Naval Air Station North Island, California. John C. Stennis was initially the group's flagship, but USS Ronald Reagan (CVN-76) relieved her in 2005.

== 2004–2005 operations ==
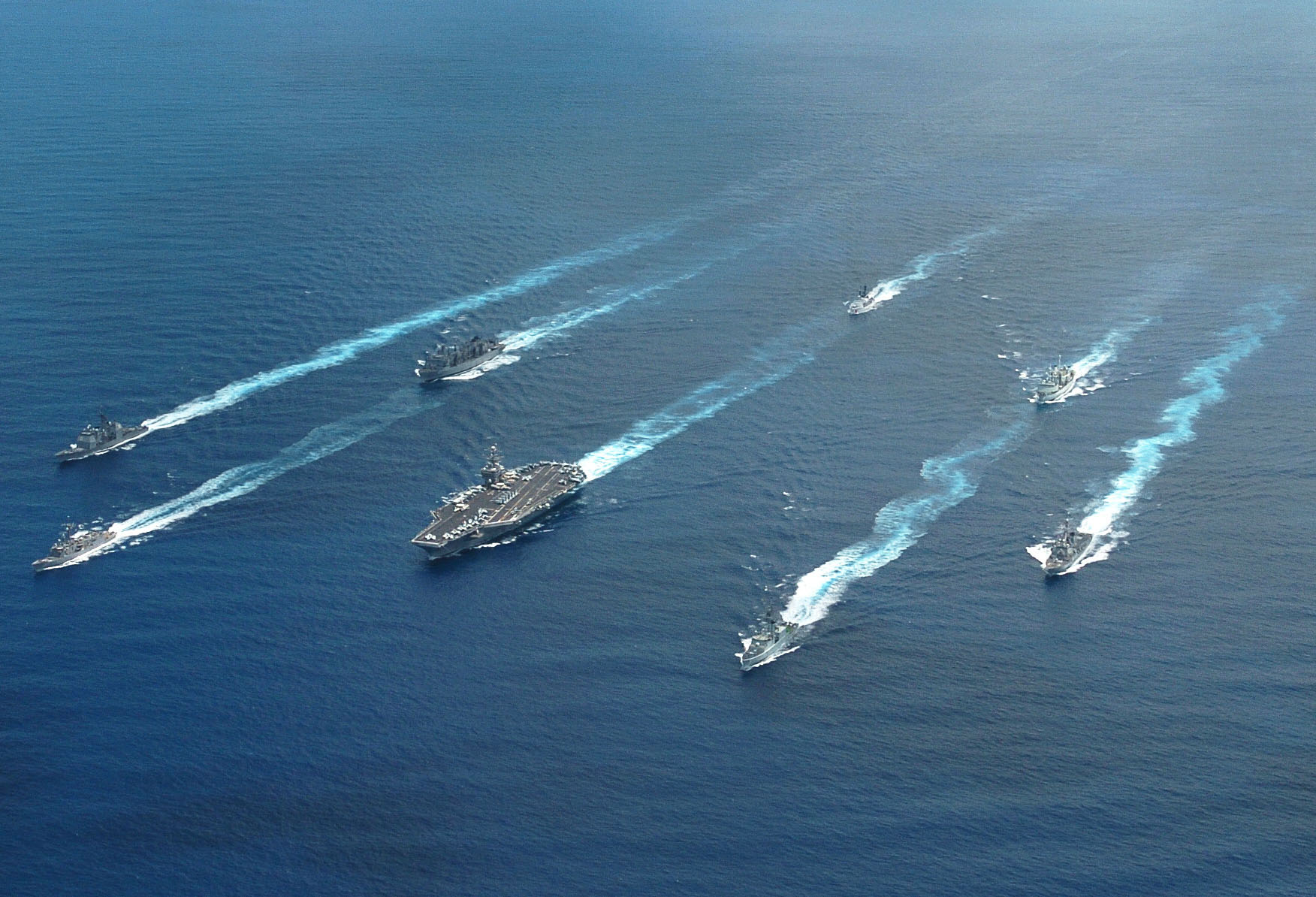
Stennis Battle Group at RIMPAC 2004

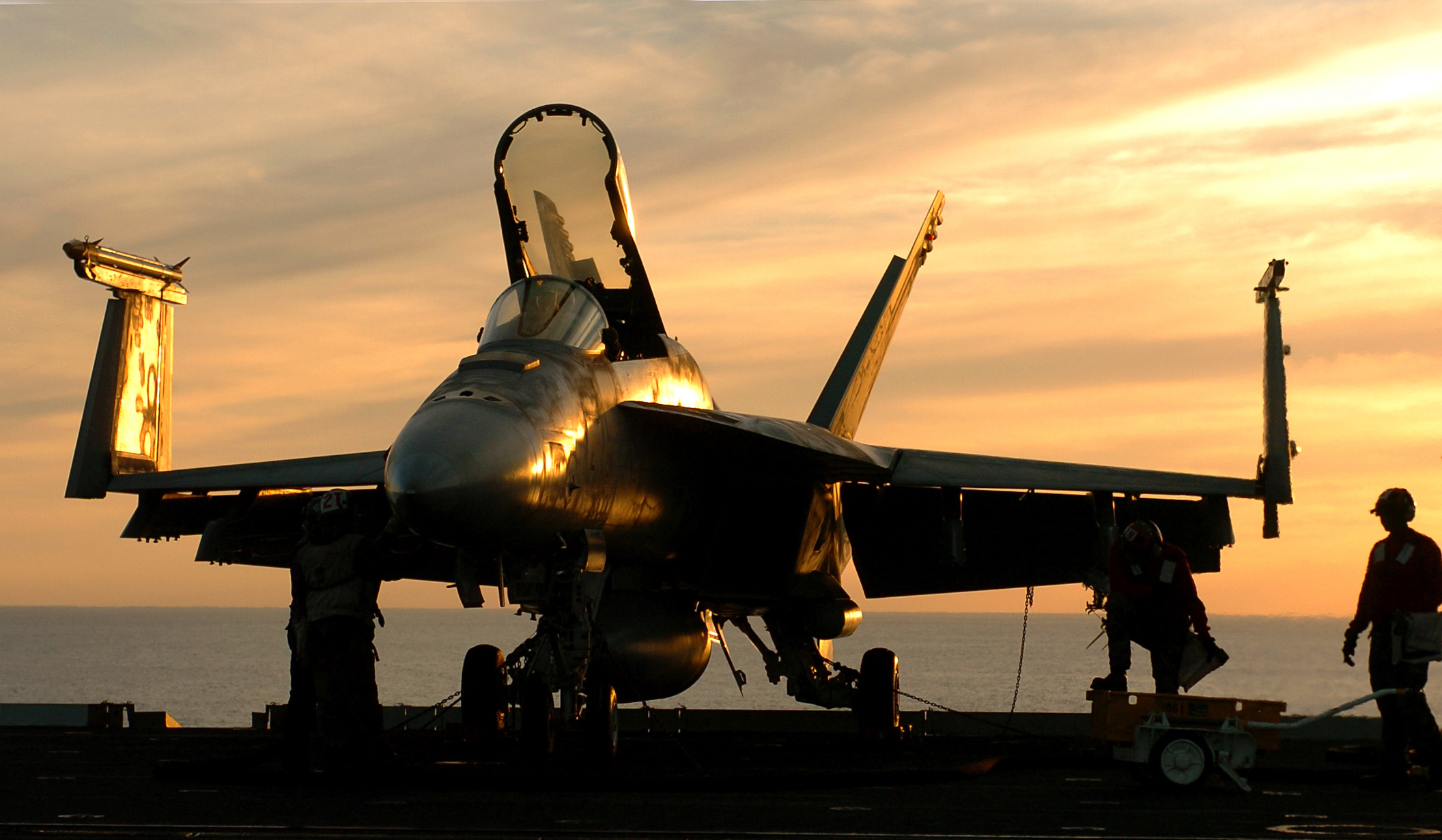
JTFEX 06-2 (12 Dec 2005)

Carrier Group 7, led by Rear Admiral Patrick M. Walsh aboard John C. Stennis, was one of six carrier battle groups to participate in Exercise Summer Pulse. Summer Pulse was a worldwide event incorporating a large number of sub-exercises. On 24 May 2004, Carrier Group 7 departed Naval Station San Diego, California, for its 2004 Summer Pulse deployment to participate in Exercise Northern Edge in the Gulf of Alaska. The battle group returned to San Diego on 1 November 2004 after participating in Northern Edge 2004, JASEX 2004, and RIMPAC 2004 (pictured).

On 1 October 2004 Carrier Group Seven was re-designated as Carrier Strike Group Seven.

Shortly after returning from the Summer Pulse '04 deployment, the group flagship changed from John C. Stennis to Ronald Reagan. John C. Stennis changed its homeport to Naval Base Kitsap in Bremerton, Washington, and Ronald Reagan's Carrier Strike Group Fifteen had been disbanded effective 21 March 2005.

On 17 October 2005, Carrier Strike Group 7 departed Naval Base San Diego, California, with Carrier Air Wing Fourteen (CVW-14) embarked on its new flagship, the carrier Ronald Reagan. The strike group began its Composite Training Unit Exercise (COMPTUEX), which is a major requirement for the carrier strike group's certification for its readiness for deployment.

COMPTUEX is an 18-day exercise designed to train the whole carrier strike group to function as one fighting force. The exercise consisted of two distinct phases and will be evaluated by Commander, Strike Force Training, U.S. Pacific Fleet. In addition to the group's own warships, several Royal Canadian Navy vessels also participated in this COMPTUEX training cycle, including the destroyer Algonquin; the frigates Vancouver, Calgary, and Ottawa; and the replenishment tanker Protecteur. On 10 November 2005, Carrier Strike Group Seven completed its COMPTUEX training exercise and returned to port. Carrier Strike Group Nine, led by the carrier Abraham Lincoln, also participated during the final battle problem, integrating its Joint Task Force Exercise (JTFEX-05) into Carrier Strike Group Seven's COMPTUEX exercises.

On 6 December 2005, Carrier Strike Group Seven departed San Diego for Joint Task Force Exercise 06-2 (JTFEX 06–2) off the coast of southern California. This nine-day exercise was the final step in preparing Carrier Strike Group Seven for its upcoming 2006 Western Pacific (WESTPAC) deployment, and it tested the strike group's ability to plan and execute alongside other U.S. and coalition forces in a war-fighting environment. On 17 December 2005, Carrier Strike Group Seven completed JTFEX 06-2 and returned to Naval Air Station North Island, with Admiral Miller noting:

The Sailors participating in this exercise performed better than any group I’ve experienced. We proved that the Ronald Reagan, DESRON (Destroyer Squadron) 7 and CVW (Carrier Air Wing) 14 have the speed and agility to quickly execute operations around the world in support of the war on terrorism.

2005 force composition

| CARSTRKGRU 7 Warships/Units | | Carrier Air Wing Fourteen (CVW-14) squadrons embarked aboard flagship USS Ronald Reagan (CVN-76) | |
|---|---|---|---|
| USS Lake Champlain (CG-57) | USS Tucson (SSN-770) | Strike Fighter Squadron 115 (VFA-115) | Airborne Early Warning Squadron 113 (VAW-113) |
| USS McCampbell (DDG-85) | USNS Rainier (T-AOE-7) | Strike Fighter Squadron 113 (VFA-113) | Electronic Attack Squadron 139 (VAQ-139) |
| USS Decatur (DDG-73) | EOD Unit 11, Det. 15 | Strike Fighter Squadron 25 (VFA-25) | Carrier Logistics Support Squadron 30 (VRC-30) |
| USS Paul Hamilton (DDG-60) | —— | Strike Fighter Squadron 22 (VFA-22) | Helicopter Anti-Submarine Squadron Four (HS-4) |

== 2006 deployment ==
On 4 January 2006, Carrier Strike Group Seven departed San Diego for its Western Pacific (WESTPAC) deployment under the command of Rear Admiral Michael H. Miller. This was the first overseas deployment for the strike group's flagship, the nuclear carrier Ronald Reagan. Off Hawaii, Carrier Strike Group completed a four-day Anti-Submarine Warfare (ASW) exercise on 12 January 2006. The purpose of this exercise was to test the anti-submarine warfare capabilities of the strike group in real-world scenarios. During the exercise, an improved surface ship sonar system that was installed in both of the destroyers attached to Carrier Strike Group Seven was used for the first time.

Carrier Strike Group Seven entered the U.S. Fifth Fleet's area of responsibility (AOR) on 18 February 2006, and fleet commander Vice Admiral Patrick M. Walsh visited the strike group's flagship, the carrier Reagan, on 27 February 2006.

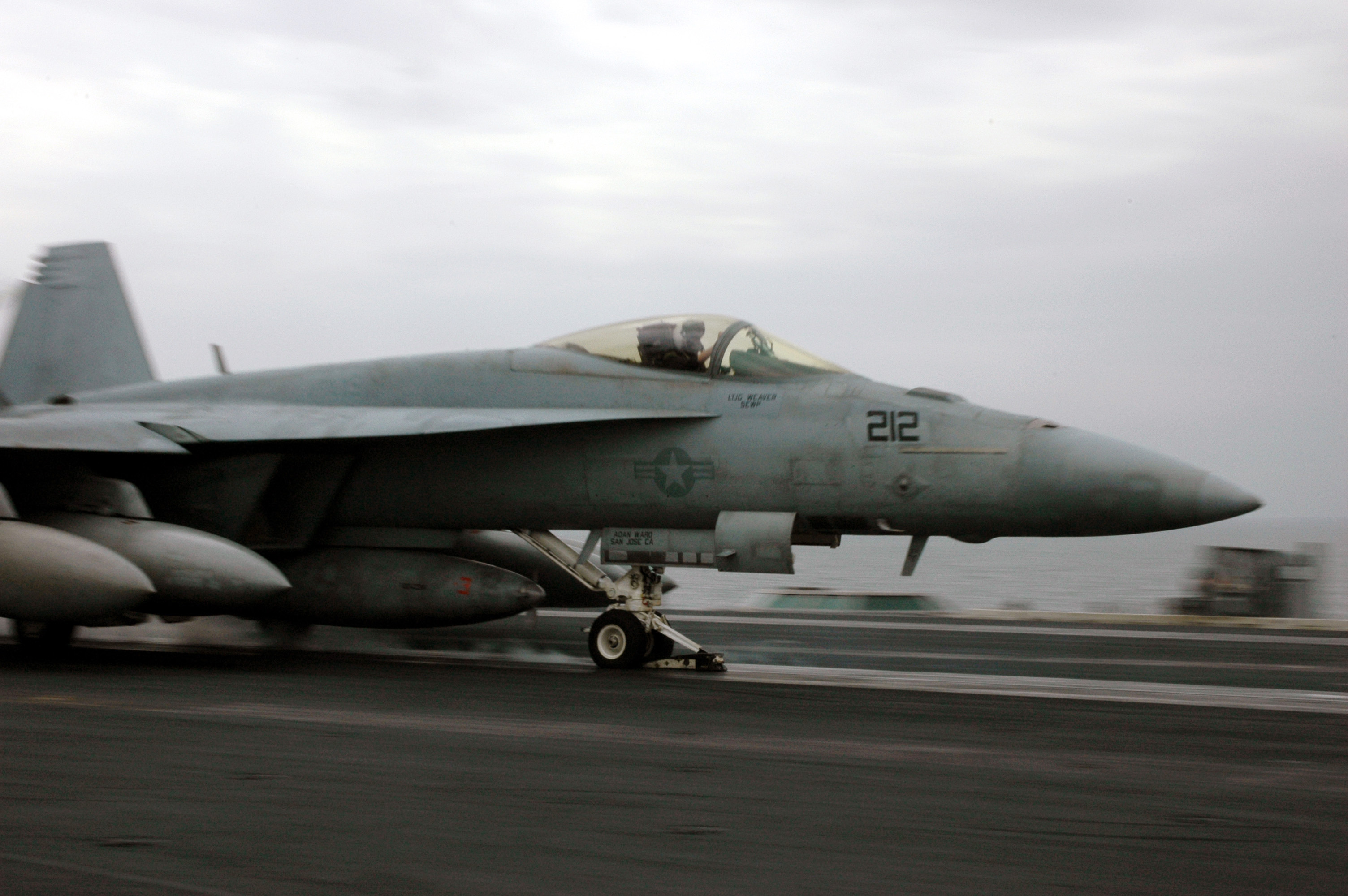
VFA-115 (22 Feb 2006)

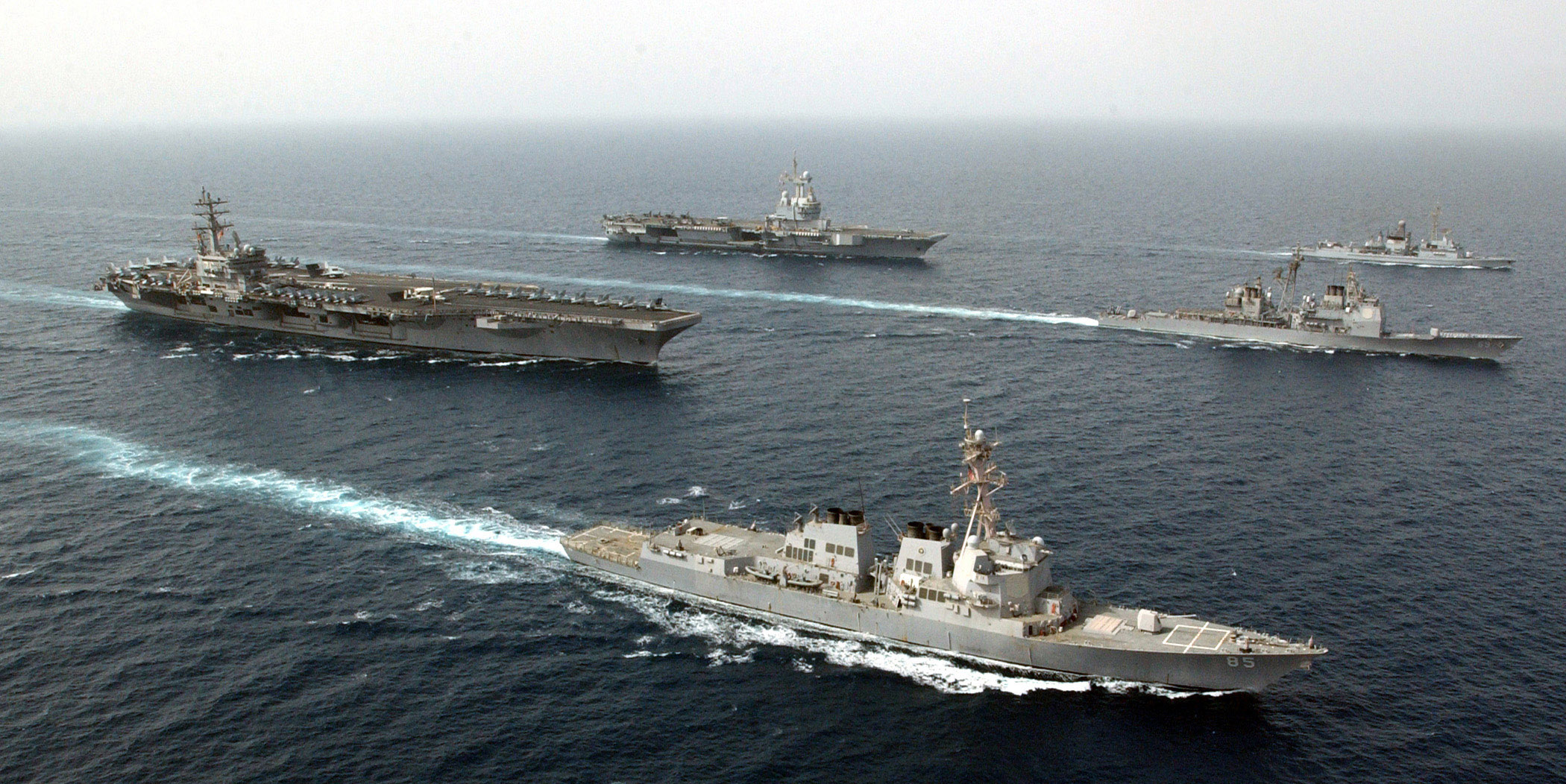
Ronald Reagan and Charles de Gaulle (27 April 2006)

On 22 February 2006, F/A-18E Super Hornets (pictured) assigned to Strike Fighter Attack Squadron 115 (VFA-115) became the first aircraft launched from the flight deck of USS Ronald Reagan to drop ordnance on enemy targets in support of Operation Iraqi Freedom. Carrier Air Wing Fourteen squadrons VFA-22, VFA-25, VFA-113, and VFA-115 were the first to deploy with F/A-18 Hornet strike fighters equipped with the Remotely Operated Video Enhanced Receiver (ROVER) system that allows ground forces, such as Joint terminal attack controllers (JTAC), to see what an aircraft or unmanned aerial vehicle (UAV) is seeing in real time by receiving images acquired by the aircraft's sensors on a laptop on the ground via video transfer with little time delay. ROVER greatly improves the JTAC on the ground reconnaissance and target identification which are essential to close air support. On 3 April 2006, the guided-missile cruiser Lake Champlain joined Combined Task Force 58 (CTF-58), a multi-national force responsible for maritime security operations (MSO) in the Northern Persian Gulf. Additionally, CTF-58 also played a key role in protecting both the Al Basrah Oil Terminal (ABOT) and the Khor Al Amaya Oil Terminal (KAAOT). Also, the guided-missile destroyer Decatur conducted maritime security operations with the Pakistani-led Combined Task Force 150 off the coast of the Horn of Africa.

Carrier Strike Group Seven performed a passing exercise (PASSEX) with the French naval task force, led by the nuclear carrier Charles de Gaulle on 27 April 2006 (pictured). The PASSEX included drills in communications, air defense and surface warfare tactics. Aircraft from the French aircraft carrier also made "touch-and-go" landings aboard the Reagan during the exercise. The strike group also participated in a PASSEX with the Indian Navy in February 2006. Beginning 15 May 2006, the guided-missile destroyer Decatur joined the French naval task force operating in the North Arabian Sea. On 29 April 2006, the guided-missile destroyer McCampbell, with the fleet ocean tugboat Catawba, participated in a proof-of-concept demonstration with Bahrainian emergency management teams. The demonstration included a simulated oil spill as well as the subsequent containment-and-recovery operation outside the port of Mina Salman.

Carrier Strike Group Seven completed operations with the Fifth Fleet on 29 May 2006. During its deployment with the Fifth Fleet, Carrier Strike Group Seven launched more than 6,100 sorties, totaling more than 19,600 flight hours, with more than 2,940 sorties and 14,200 flight hours in direct support of Operation Iraqi Freedom.

=== 2006 deployment force composition ===
| Units | CARSTRKGRU 7 Warships | Carrier Air Wing Fourteen (CVW-14) squadrons embarked aboard flagship USS Ronald Reagan (CVN-76) | |
|---|---|---|---|
| No. 1 | USS Lake Champlain (CG-57) | Strike Fighter Squadron 115 (VFA-115): F/A-18E | Helicopter Anti-Submarine Squadron Four (HS-4): SH-60F/HH-60H |
| No. 2 | USS McCampbell (DDG-85) | Strike Fighter Squadron 113 (VFA-113): F/A-18E | Carrier Logistics Support Squadron 30 (VRC-30): C-2A |
| No. 3 | USS Decatur (DDG-73) | Strike Fighter Squadron 25 (VFA-25): F/A-18C(N) | — |
| No. 4 | USS Paul Hamilton (DDG-60) | Strike Fighter Squadron 22 (VFA-22): F/A-18C(N) | — |
| No. 5 | USNS Rainier (T-AOE-7) | Electronic Attack Squadron 139 (VAQ-139): EA-6B | — |
| No. 6 | EOD Unit 11, Det. 15 | Airborne Early Warning Squadron 113 (VAW-113): E-2C 2000 | — |
| Notes | | | |

=== Valiant Shield 2006 ===
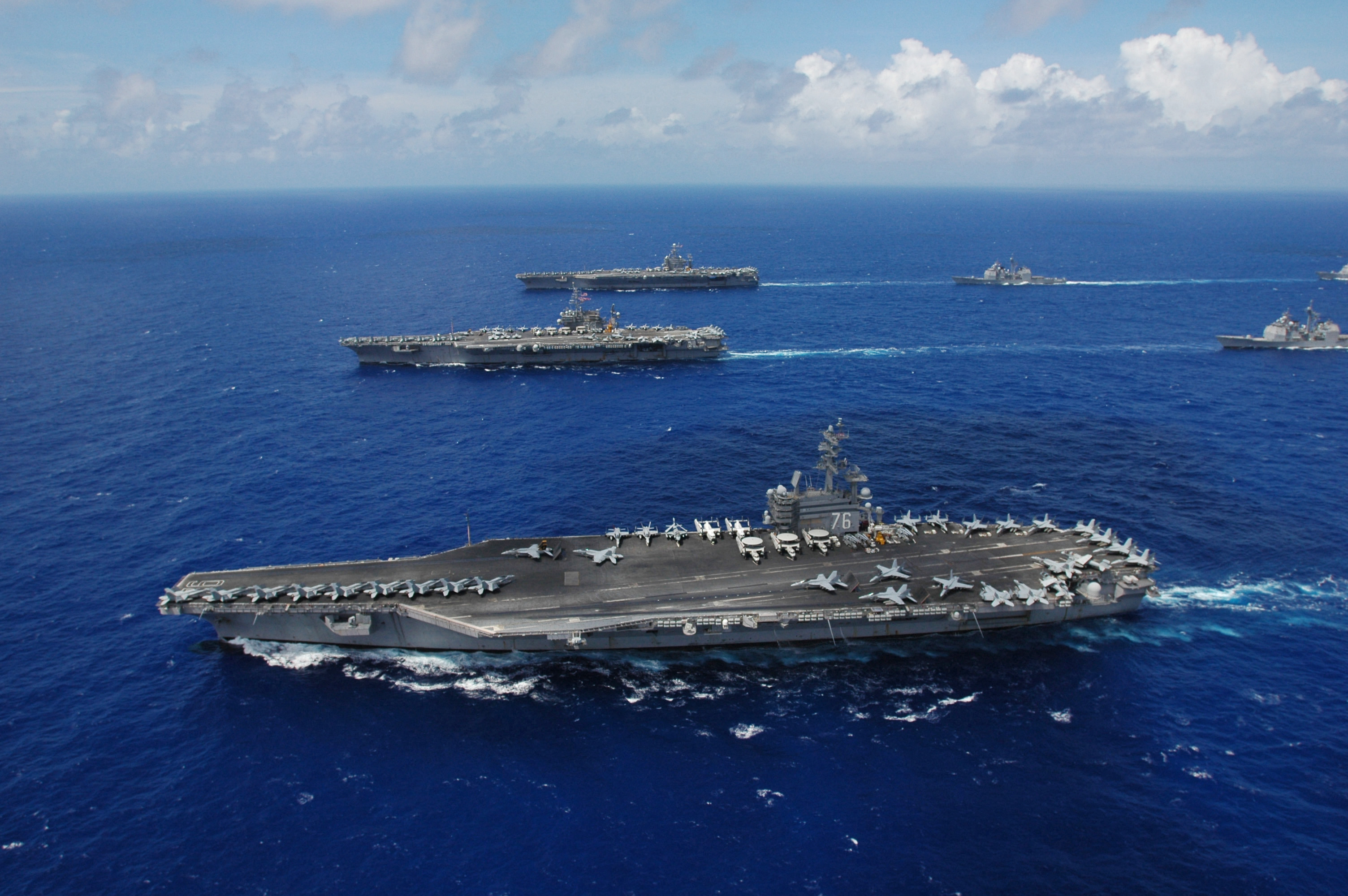
Three strike groups sail in formation during the exercise

From 19 to 23 June 2006 the strike group took part in Exercise Valiant Shield 2006, held in the Guam operating area. The exercise included 28 naval vessels, nearly 300 aircraft and, approximately 22,000 Armed Forces personnel. Valiant Shield was designed to demonstrate the ability to conduct joint command and control operations, and to rapidly deploying joint forces in response to any regional contingency. The centerpiece of Valiant Shield 2006 was the three carrier strike groups (pictured):

- Carrier Strike Group Five led by the USS Kitty Hawk (CV-63) with Carrier Air Wing Five (CVW-5) embarked
- Carrier Strike Group Seven led by the USS Ronald Reagan (CVN-76) with Carrier Air Wing Fourteen (CVW-14) embarked
- Carrier Strike Group Nine led by the USS Abraham Lincoln (CVN-72) with Carrier Air Wing Two (CVW-2) embarked

Guided-missile destroyers McCampbell and Decatur performed anti-submarine warfare patrols off the coast of Guam.

=== 2006 deployment exercises and port visits ===
| Number | Regional Exercises | | | | Port Visits | | Notes |
| Number | Duration | U.S. Force | Joint/Bilateral/Multilateral Partner(s) | Operating Area | Location | Dates | Notes |
|---|---|---|---|---|---|---|---|
| 1st: | 9–12 Jan 2006 | Carrier Strike Group Seven | Anti-Submarine Warfare (ASW) exercise | Hawaiian operating area | Brisbane, Australia | 23–27 Jan 2006 | |
| 2nd: | — | Carrier Strike Group Seven | — | — | Singapore | 7 February 2006 | |
| 3rd: | — | McCampbell | — | — | Republic of Maldives | 17 February 2006 | |
| 4th: | — | Carrier Strike Group Seven | — | — | Jebel Ali, UAE | 15–19 Mar 2006 | |
| 5th: | — | Carrier Strike Group Seven | — | — | Jebel Ali, UAE | 16–20 Apr 2006 | |
| 6th: | 27 April 2006 | Carrier Strike Group Seven | PASSEX: French Navy (Note: French warships were the nuclear-powered aircraft carrier Charles de Gaulle and guided-missile frigate Cassard.) | Arabian Sea | Jebel Ali, UAE | 14–18 May 2006 | |
| 7th | 29 April 2006 | McCambell, Catawba | Royal Bahrain Naval Force | Mina Salman, Bahrain | — | — | |
| 8th: | — | Carrier Strike Group Seven | — | — | Port Kelang, Malaysia | 3–5 June 2006 | |
| 9th | — | McCambell | — | — | Hong Kong | 3 June 2007 | |
| 10th | — | Decatur | — | — | Phuket, Thailand | 2–5 June 2007 | |
| 11th: | 16 June 2006 | Carrier Strike Group Seven | Valiant Shield 2006 | Guam operating area | Hong Kong | 10–13 Jun 2006 | |

== 2006 operations ==
On 20 October 2006, the carrier Ronald Reagan returned to San Diego following a week of carrier qualifications (CQ) for Training Squadron 4 (VT-4) off the coast of Southern California. During this period, on 18 October, Ronald Reagan completed its 20,000 arrested landings (pictured) since the ship was commissioned in 2003.

== See also ==
- Carrier Strike Group Seven 2007–2009 operations

== Notes ==
Footnotes

Citations
