= VFA-113 =

United States Navy aviation squadron based at NAS Lemoore, California, USA

Strike Fighter Squadron 113
- Active: 15 August 1948 - present
- Country: United States
- Branch: United States Navy
- Type: Fighter/Attack
- Role: Close air support Air interdiction Aerial reconnaissance
- Part of: Carrier Air Wing Two
- Garrison/HQ: NAS Lemoore
- Nickname: "Stingers"
- Mottos: "First and Finest"; Stingtown; Stinger Sorties
- Engagements: Korean War; Vietnam War; Gulf War; Operation Southern Watch; Operation Enduring Freedom; Iraq War; Operation Inherent Resolve; Operation Prosperity Guardian; Operation Poseidon Archer
- Decorations: Presidential Unit Citation; 2 Navy Unit Commendations; 6 Service stars Battle Efficiency "E"; Wade McClusky Award 1970; Chief of Naval Operations Safety Award 1971, 1982, 1991; Chief of Naval Operations Aviation Safety Award 1992, 1993

Commanders
- Commanding Officer: CMD. Pete "Nacho" Cornett
- Executive Officer: CMD. Daniel "SISTA" Solfelt
- Command Master Chief: CMDCM. Andre Dortrait

Insignia
- Tail code: NE

Aircraft flown
- Attack: A-4 Skyhawk; A-7 Corsair II
- Fighter: F8F Bearcat; F4U Corsair; F9F Panther; F9F Cougar; F/A-18 Hornet; F/A-18E Super Hornet

Strike Fighter Squadron 113 (VFA-113), also known as the "Stingers," is a United States Navy strike fighter squadron based at Naval Air Station Lemoore, California. They are an operational fleet F/A-18E Super Hornet squadron attached to Carrier Air Wing 2 (CVW-2) and based at NAS Lemoore, California. Their tailcode is NE and their radio callsign is Sting.

== Squadron Insignia and Nickname ==
The squadron’s original insignia was approved by Chief of Naval Operations (CNO) on 15 April 1949, and it was slightly modified in 1985. The squadron's "Stingers" nickname was adopted in 1949.

== History ==
=== 1940s ===
The squadron was originally established as Fighter Squadron 113 (VF-113) on 15 July 1948 at NAS San Diego, flying the F8F-1/2 Bearcat.

=== 1950s ===
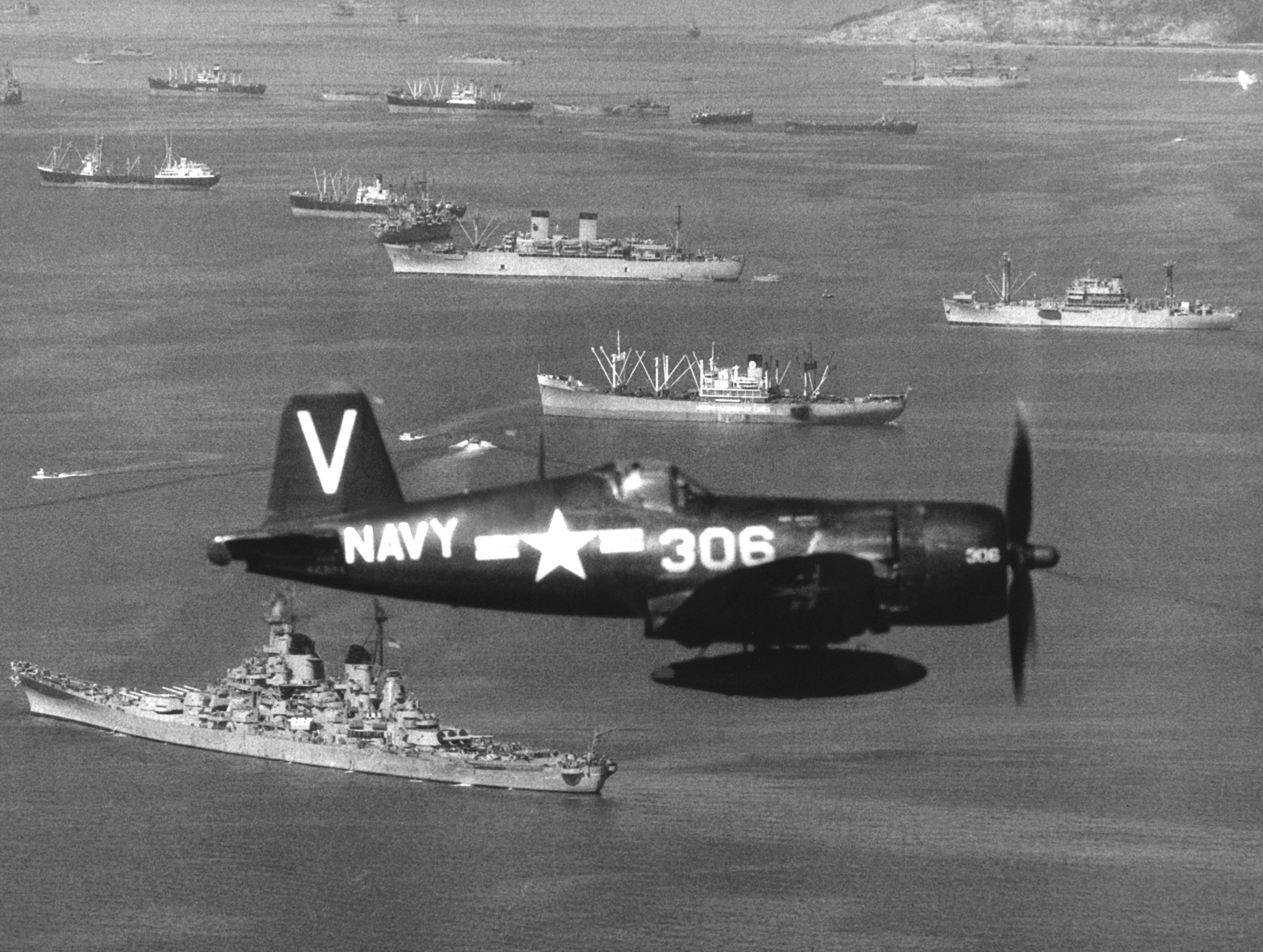
VF-113 F4U-4B Corsair flies over U.S. ships at Inchon, Korea, on 15 September 1950

In March 1950, the squadron transitioned to the F4U-4B Corsair. Attached to Air Group 11, the squadron flew their first combat strikes on 5 August 1950 from USS Philippine Sea and USS Valley Forge against targets near Kunsan, Korea. In September 1950, the squadron flew combat sorties in support of the United States Marine Corps landings at Incheon. In November 1950, squadron aircraft participated in Operation Pinwheel, the docking and departing of the carrier from the pier using aircraft engine power to move the ship. Also in November 1950, during strikes on bridges crossing the Yalu River, squadron F4U-4Bs were attacked by MiG-15s, with neither side suffering any damage. On 23 June 1952, squadron aircraft, along with planes from three other air groups, participated in the first coordinated strikes against North Korean hydroelectric power plants. This was the first time that enemy power plants had been so heavily targeted. It also marked the first time that four carriers were on line off the coast of Korea since late 1950. VF-113 won six engagement stars as well as the Presidential Unit Citation and Navy Unit Commendations in two Korean combat tours.

The squadron moved to NAS Miramar on 15 September 1952 and transitioned to the F9F-1 Panther on 5 October 1952. In February 1954, the squadron upgraded to the F9F-2. In May 1955, the squadron again upgraded to the swept wing F9F-8 Cougar and in March 1956 was redesignated Attack Squadron One Hundred Thirteen (VA-113). In April 1957, they transitioned to the A-4 Skyhawk, flying several different Skyhawk models over the next 11 years.

While operating from USS Shangri-La in August–September 1958, the squadron was part of a task force that provided support to the Republic of China during the shelling of the Quemoy Islands by the Chinese Communists. The squadron was awarded the Battle Efficiency "E" for 1958, denoting it as the best Attack Squadron on the West Coast.

=== 1960s ===
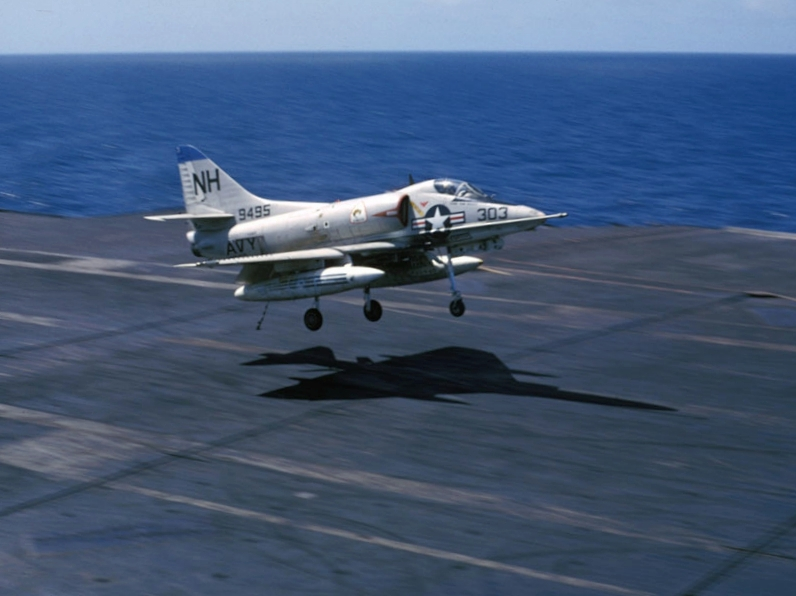
VA-113 A-4C landing on USS Kitty Hawk in 1966

In late 1961, the squadron embarked on USS Kitty Hawk for her transit, via Cape Horn, from NS Norfolk to her new home port at NAS North Island. The "Stingers" also moved to a new home at NAS Lemoore on 12 December 1961.

In June 1964, squadron aircraft participated in Yankee Team operations, including aerial refuelling for RF-8A Crusaders and F-101 Voodoos, and search and rescue missions over South Vietnam and Laos. From November 1964 to October 1965, the squadron provided a detachment of personnel and A-4s for use as fighter protection for USS Bennington.

October 1965 brought the squadron back to the Western Pacific for a combat deployment aboard USS Kitty Hawk. The squadron flew numerous missions into North Vietnam against enemy lines of communications, as well as close air support in South Vietnam. In December 1965 during the squadron’s first line-period on Yankee Station, they participated in three major strikes against important North Vietnamese targets, including the Haiphong Bridge, Uong Bi Thermal Power Plant and the Hải Dương Bridge.

The squadron's second tour in Vietnam was aboard USS Enterprise, from 19 November 1966 to 6 July 1967, earning them Navy Unit Commendation. The squadron upgraded to the A-4F in October 1967.

The squadron again deployed to South East Asia aboard USS Enterprise on 3 January 1968. En route to Yankee Station, the carrier was ordered to the Sea of Japan for operations following the seizure of USS Pueblo by the North Koreans. After return from deployment on 18 July 1968, the squadron transitioned to the A-7 Corsair II in December 1968, and was awarded the coveted Arleigh Burke Award, and the Battle Efficiency "E" award for the year.

=== 1970s ===
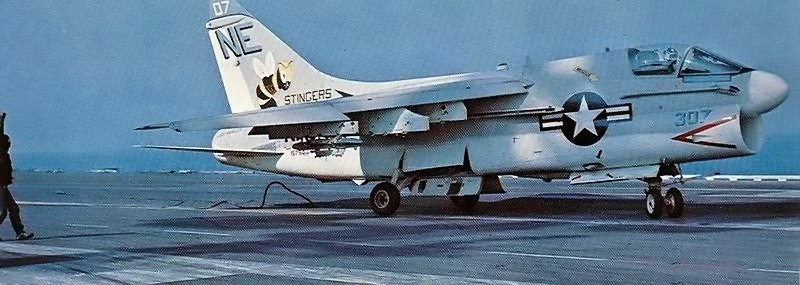
VA-113 A-7E on USS Ranger in 1970/71

VA-113 upgraded to the A-7E in April 1970, and returned to combat operations in Southeast Asia during November 1970 aboard USS Ranger. The squadron's performance during this deployment earned them the Wade McClusky Award, given annually to the "Outstanding Attack Squadron in the Navy." Additionally, VA-113 earned the Chief of Naval Operations Safety Award for Fiscal Year 1971.

VA-113 departed Alameda, California in November 1972 for its sixth combat cruise to Southeast Asia. During this deployment the squadron participated in air strikes during Operation Linebacker II and saw action over South Vietnam, Laos, Cambodia and North Vietnam.

In May 1974 the squadron returned to WESTPAC as part of the Carrier Air Wing 2/USS Ranger team. VA-113 continued this association for the next eight years, completing four more peacetime WESTPAC deployments while compiling an accident-free safety record in the A-7E.

=== 1980s ===
From 15 October 1980 to 22 March 1981, under the "Swing Wing Concept" to reduce the deck multiple on Ranger, VA-113 operated as a CVW-2 Detachment from NAS Cubi Point.

In August 1982 the squadron surpassed 40,000 accident-free flight hours which represented the longest accident-free period in the entire Navy A-7 community. In recognition of superior safety awareness and operations, the squadron was presented the prestigious Chief of Naval Operations Safety Award for 1982.

On 24 August 1984, the first F/A-18 Hornet bearing "Stinger" colors was delivered to VFA-125, and the VA-113 pilots began transition training. The squadron was redesignated Strike Fighter Squadron One Hundred Thirteen (VFA-113) on 25 March 1984, and they completed the transition on 14 December 1984, becoming the first operational fleet Hornet squadron. The squadron soon embarked aboard USS Constellation for the first carrier deployment of the F/A-18 with Carrier Air Wing 14 from February to August 1985.

From April to October 1987, the squadron again deployed to the Indian and Western Pacific Oceans. The squadron supported Operation Earnest Will, the armed escort of American-flagged merchant ships in the Persian Gulf region.

The squadron deployed in December 1988 aboard USS Constellation to the Indian and Western Pacific Oceans, returning in June 1989. Immediately upon their return, they upgraded to C model Hornets.

=== 1990s ===
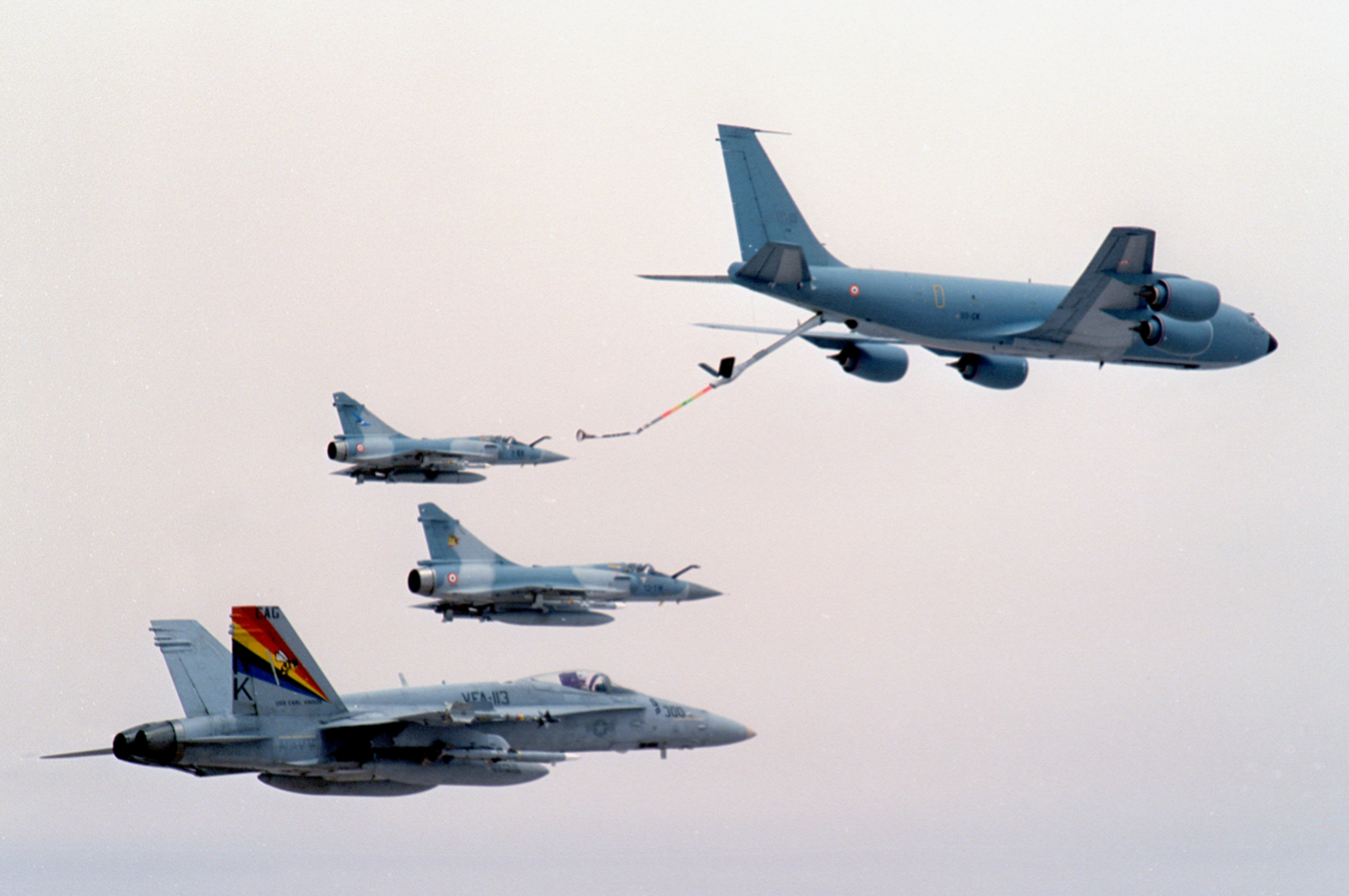
A KC-135 refueling 2 French Mirage 2000 and 1 VFA-113 F/A-18.

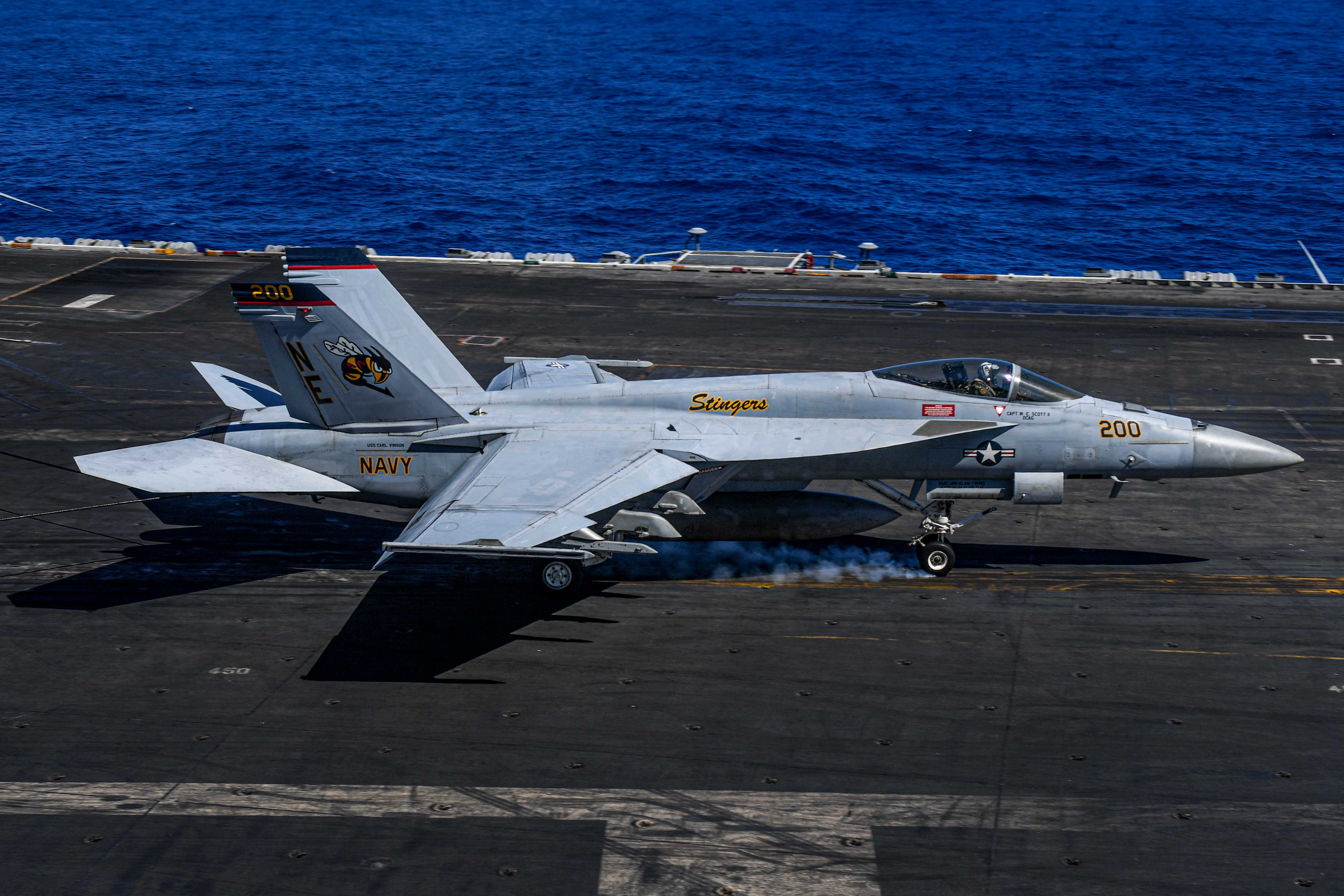
VFA-113 F/A-18E Super Hornet on the deck of USS Carl Vinson

Safety and proficiency milestones were set again in May 1990, as the squadron advanced the Navy's Tactical Aviation Safety Record to 16 years and over 70,000 mishap-free hours.

In June 1990, the squadron once again sailed to the Western Pacific, aboard Independence. Following the Iraqi invasion of Kuwait on 2 August 1990, USS Independence was ordered to the Gulf of Oman, becoming the first aircraft carrier on station. VFA-113 conducted Operation Desert Shield missions over the North Persian Gulf and Saudi Arabia. On 3–4 October 1990, VFA-113 conducted flight operations from USS Independence while she operated in the Persian Gulf, marking the first time a carrier had operated in the Gulf since 1974. The squadron returned from this deployment on 20 December 1990.

In February 1994, the squadron deployed aboard USS Carl Vinson as part of Cruiser Destroyer Group Three. During this deployment, the squadron conducted operations throughout the Pacific and Indian Ocean theatres. In addition to missions off the coast of Korea during International Atomic Energy Agency and United Nations negotiations, they also flew multiple missions into Iraq in support of Operation Southern Watch. The squadron compiled a record 21 years and over 93,000 mishap free flight hours, and received three consecutive Chief of Naval Operations Aviation Safety Awards from 1991–1993.

In May 1996, VFA-113 deployed as part of Carrier Air Wing 14 embarked on USS Carl Vinson took part in WESTPAC 96, Operation Southern Watch and Operation Desert Strike, returning from deployment on 12 November 1996.

=== 2000s ===
VFA-113 played a major role in the "Mission Accomplished" deployment while aboard the USS Abraham Lincoln from 2002-2003. After completing that 10-month deployment, the Stingers had a quick turnaround and would deploy aboard the USS John C. Stennis in 2004. The squadron, along with the rest of CVW-14 took part in USS Ronald Reagan's maiden deployment from January through July 2006. The deployment took the squadron through the Western Pacific and into the Persian Gulf in support of Operation Iraqi Freedom.

=== 2010s ===
On 11 April 2011, an F/A-18 strike fighter from squadron VFA-113 made a successful single-engine landing aboard USS Carl Vinson, bursting in flames in the process. However, no fatalities occurred due to the fire-fighting efforts of the flight deck personnel.

In August 2014, VFA-113 embarked aboard USS Carl Vinson for a scheduled deployment to the Western Pacific and Middle East. The squadron took part in Operation Inherent Resolve supporting combat operations in Iraq and Syria.

On 12 September 2014, two F/A-18Cs, one from VFA-94 and the other from VFA-113 collided and crashed approximately 250 nautical miles (460 km; 290 mi) west of Wake Island. One aviator was recovered in fair condition and received medical treatment aboard Carl Vinson. Search-and-rescue (SAR) operations continued for the other aviator. Carl Vinson was participating in Exercise Valiant Shield 2014 at the time of the mid-air collision. The search was called off on 14 September 2014, and the missing aviator was declared missing and presumed dead, with the crash incident under investigation.

On 17 February 2016, the final F/A-18C departed VFA-113's flightline and was transferred to NAS Oceana, Virginia. Since then, the squadron has transitioned to the F/A-18E Super Hornet. As the last Navy F/A-18C squadron on the west coast to transition to the Super Hornet, that last flight happened to be the last operational legacy Hornet flight ever for NAS Lemoore.

On 6 October 2017, VFA-113 embarked aboard USS Theodore Roosevelt to the Western Pacific and Middle East. While deployed they operated in support of Operations Inherent Resolve and Freedom's Sentinel, returning in May 2018.

in 2019, the squadron was reassigned to Carrier Air Wing 2, thus swapping places with VFA-137.

=== 2020s ===
On 3 June 2022 an F/A-18E Super Hornet crashed near the city of Trona, California in the Mojave Desert. The pilot did not eject and was the only fatality in the crash.

In mid November 2024, VFA-113 and their F/A-18Es departed the US as part of CVW-2 on a scheduled deployment aboard the USS Carl Vinson

Following multiple exercises with Pacific Rim militaries, VFA-113 and CVW-2 were ordered to operate in the Red Sea in defense of international shipping lanes and Israel against Houthi/Iran proxy military unit attacks from Yemen.

VFA-113 and CVW-2 arrived in the CENTCOM AOR in early April 2025 with extensive combat operations against the Houthis/Iranians commencing upon arrival to the region.

The squadron currently operates the Block III Super Hornet as of 2026.

== See also ==
- Naval aviation
- Modern US Navy carrier air operations
- List of United States Navy aircraft squadrons
- List of Inactive United States Navy aircraft squadrons
