= Chief of Naval Operations Aviation Safety Award =

U.S. Navy and Marine Corps award

The Chief of Naval Operations Aviation Safety Award, also known as the Safety "S", is awarded annually to U.S. Navy and United States Marine Corps aviation units operating under Navy chains of command.

== Selection ==
Capital letter "S" painted on the side of this S-3B Viking indicates that the squadron was the recipient of the annual CNO Aviation Safety Award. The hashmarks under the letter indicate multiple year awards.

One squadron from each type of aircraft (e.g. E-2 Hawkeye, FA-18 Hornet, P-3 Orion, etc.) from each coast (i.e. East and West) is chosen. For example, one SH-60 Seahawk squadron from NAS Norfolk, Virginia and one SH-60 squadron from NAS North Island, California is chosen each year. Marine squadrons that deploy with Navy units are also eligible. Selected squadrons receive engraved plaques and citations for permanent display, and are also entitled to paint a prominent "S" on their aircraft until the next year's selections are made.

== Criteria ==
Selection of winners is based on aircraft flight mishap rates, ground mishaps, currency of safety programs, and flight exposure (aircraft-days embarked aboard ship (if appropriate), aircraft-days deployed away from home base (if applicable), etc.). Subjective criteria are also used; these include quality contributions to the Naval Aviation Safety Program, such as timely reporting of hazards, recommendations for corrective action, safety articles for publication, suggestions for improvement in equipment (survival, aircraft, ground support, etc.) facilities, maintenance practices, and other matters considered appropriate.

== See also ==
- List of aviation awards
