= VA25 =

VA-25 has the following meanings:

- Attack Squadron 25 (U.S. Navy)
- Virginia State Route 25 (disambiguation)
