= ROVER =

Military surveillance system

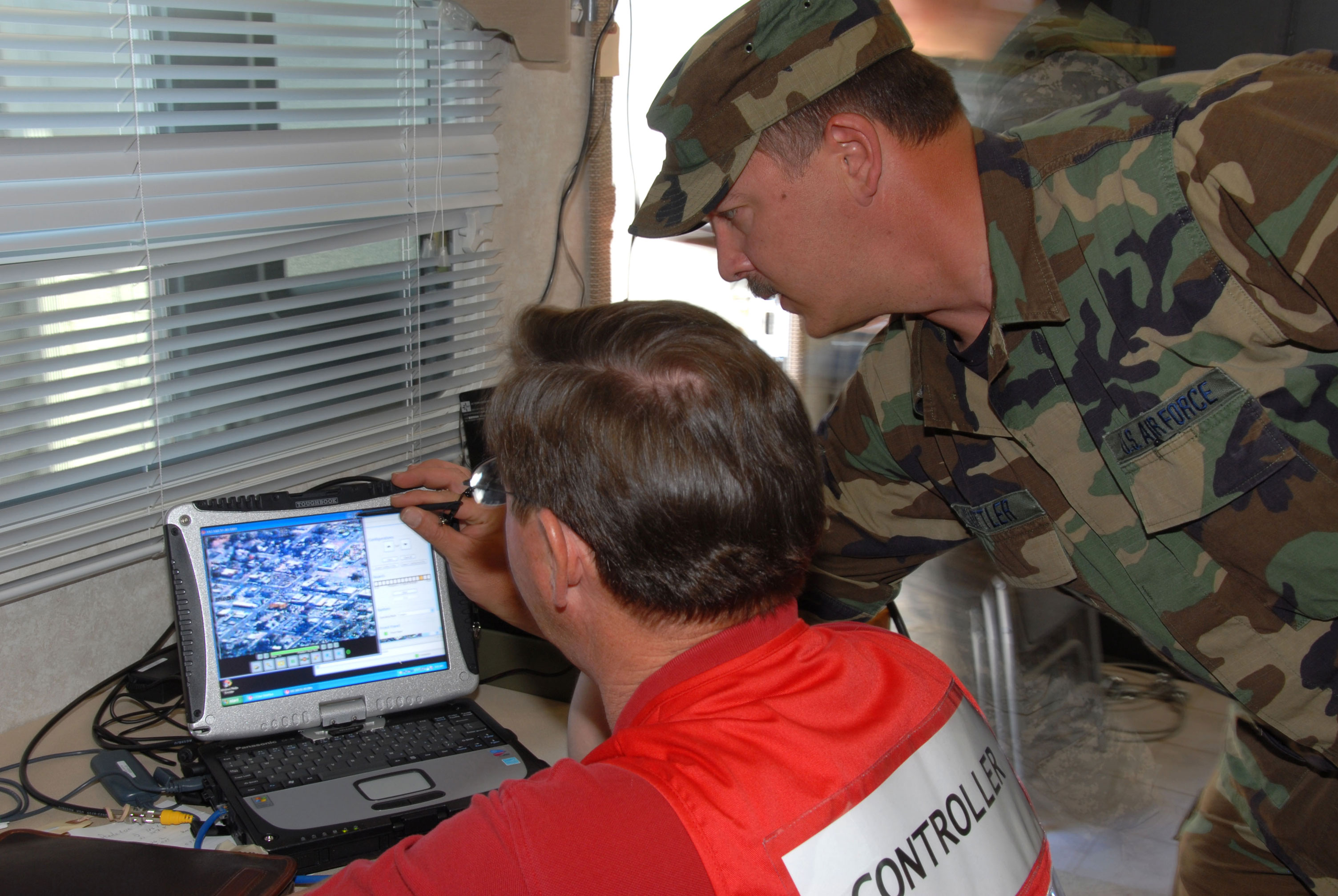
ROVER consists of a laptop receiver for aircraft video feeds.

Remotely Operated Video Enhanced Receiver (ROVER) is a system which allows ground forces, such as Forward air controllers (FAC), to see what an aircraft or unmanned aerial vehicle (UAV) is seeing in real time by receiving images acquired by the aircraft's sensors on a laptop on the ground. There's little time delay and usage of ROVER greatly improves the FAC on the ground reconnaissance and target identification which are essential to close air support.

== ROVER system ==
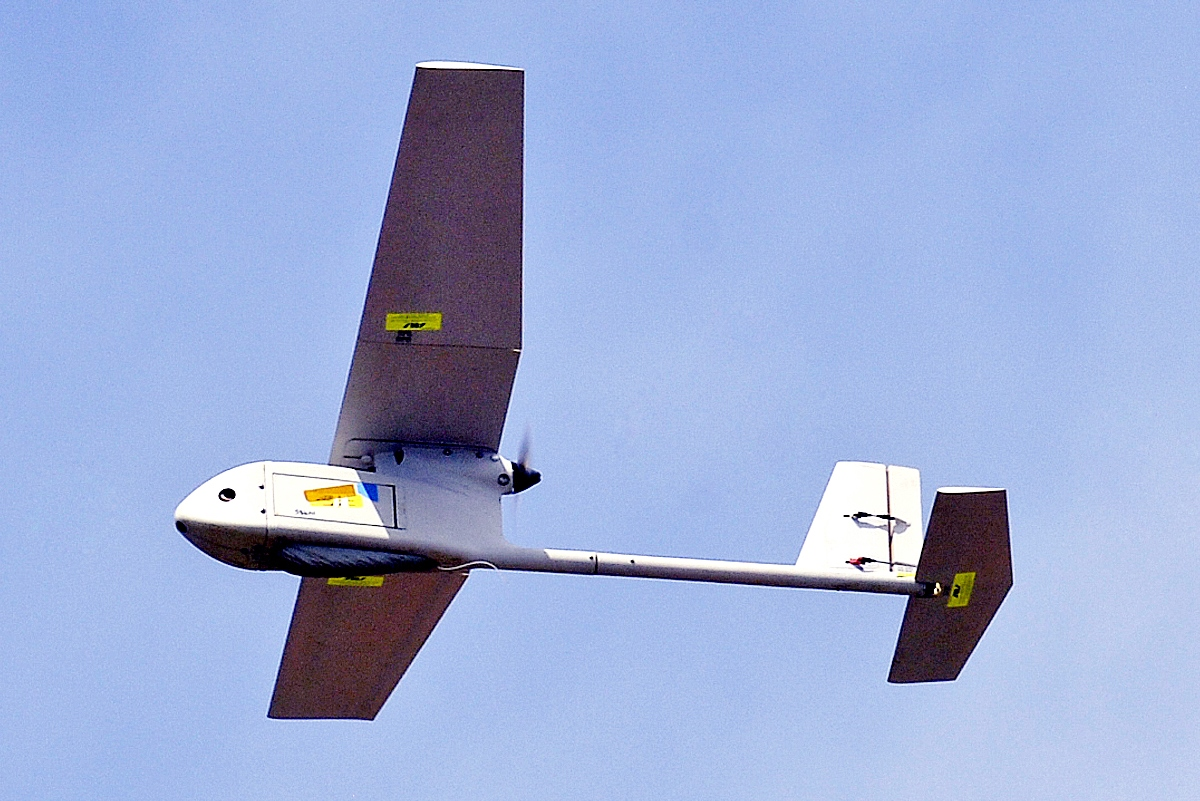
UAVs such as the RQ-11 Raven transmit video that shows real-time, nearby dangers.

The initial ROVER system, ROVER I, was developed in 2002 to allow ground forces to view video feeds from Predator UAVs or AC-130 gunships. The interface was so large it was carried in a Humvee, but it avoided the long delay of having to call a distant UAV controller and ask what the aircraft was seeing. By fall of 2004, the system's size was reduced to that of a 5.4 kg (12 lb) device carried in a backpack. ROVER IV plans to include the capability to interface with a wide variety of aircraft and also allow interaction between ground controllers and close air support pilots. With ROVER III, ground controllers have to talk the pilot to the target since they only see the image the aircraft transmits. ROVER IV seeks to use GPS and other systems to allow the controller to click a target they would like the aircraft to engage or the UAV operator to focus on. ROVER is compatible with UAVs and aircraft carrying the LITENING targeting pod as well as other targeting systems.

== U.S. Navy usage ==
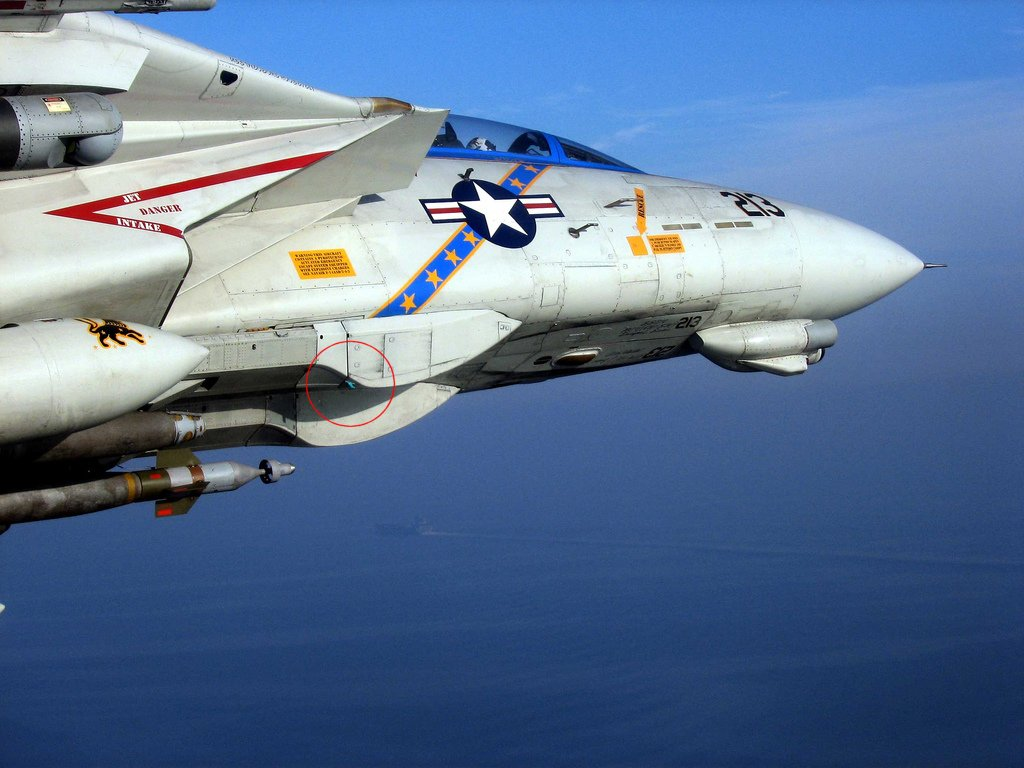
An F-14D(R) Super Tomcat with the ROVER transmit antenna circled. USS Theodore Roosevelt (CVN-71) in the background.

ROVER III capability was added to the F-14D Super Tomcat during its last deployment. It was first used by VF-31 and VF-213 on their last cruise with the F-14 Tomcat in 2005 and 2006. Within days of the modification teams arrival on the USS Theodore Roosevelt (CVN-71) all F-14 Tomcats had complete ROVER capability. Before ROVER, ground controllers had to rely on "visual talk-ons" to hunt enemy ground forces and would use a map to guide pilots where they needed to go. A joint VF-31/VF-213 investigation revealed that it would be possible to modify the F-14D Super Tomcat with off-the-shelf technology for only 800 dollars per aircraft.

A team of F-14D experts from the Naval Air Systems Command (NAVAIR) F-14 Program Office (PMA-241) staff at Naval Air Station Patuxent River was presented with this idea in early November 2005 and were able to research, develop and field this technology within a six-week window. Northrop Grumman employees from Naval Air Station Oceana and members of the fleet support team from Naval Air Systems Command Depot at Naval Air Station Jacksonville performed the aircraft modification.

F/A-18 Hornets and Super Hornets from VFA-25, VFA-113, VFA-22 and VFA-115 were also modified with ROVER capability for the first deployment of the USS Ronald Reagan in 2006.

The Sniper Advanced Targeting Pod also uses the ROVER for ground station.

== See also ==
- LITENING targeting pod - LITENING II targeting pod is also usable with ROVER
