= VA-145 (U.S. Navy) =

Attack Squadron 145
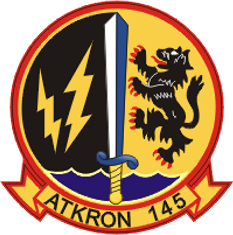
- Active: 20 July 1950 - 1 October 1993
- Country: United States
- Branch: United States Navy
- Nickname(s): Swordsmen
- Engagements: Korean War; Vietnam War; Operation Earnest Will; Operation Nimble Archer; Operation Desert Storm; Operation Restore Hope; Operation Southern Watch

Aircraft flown
- Attack: TBM Avenger; AD-1/2/4Q/4L/4NA/5/6 Skyraider; A-6A/B/C/E/TRAM/SWIP Intruder
- Tanker: KA-6D Intruder

Attack Squadron 145 (VA-145) was an aviation unit of the United States Navy, nicknamed the Rustlers from 1951-1954, and the Swordsmen thereafter. The squadron was established as Reserve squadron VA-702 on 1 December 1949, and called to active duty on 20 July 1950. It was redesignated VA-145 on 4 February 1953, and disestablished on 1 October 1993.

== Operational history ==
- 27 March 1951: The squadron conducted its first combat sortie, flying close air support missions in Korea. Apr 1951: The squadron, embarked on USS Boxer, operated in the Taiwan Strait.
- 20 September 1951: VA-702 flew its last close air support sortie in Korea and thereafter, concentrated its strikes on enemy facilities and targets of opportunity as part of the interdiction program. This policy, the result of fairly stable front lines, was effective 21 September and applied to all units of the Fast Carrier Task Force. Close air support missions were now flown only by the Marine Corps and Air Force. This policy was modified later in the war and Fast Carrier Task Force squadrons again flew close air support missions.
- 16 October 1952: Commander B. T. Simonds, the squadron’s commanding officer, was lost when his plane crashed into the water immediately following its launch from the USS Kearsarge.
- June–August 1958: The squadron was embarked on USS Ranger for her transit from Norfolk, via Cape Horn, to her new home port at Alameda.

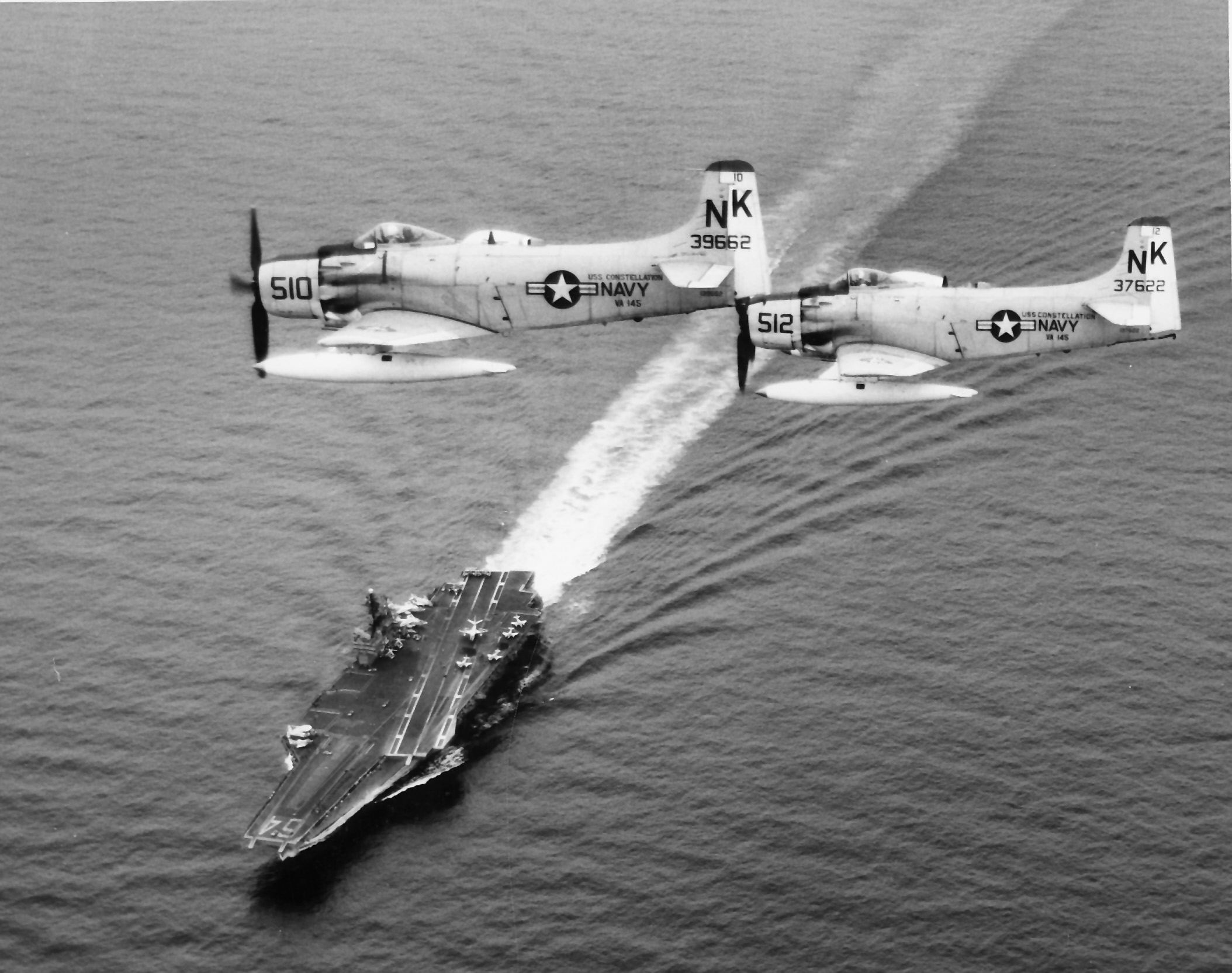
A-1H Skyraiders of VA-145 over USS Constellation.

- 5–8 July 1959: The squadron, embarked on Ranger, flew sorties from the carrier while it operated off Taiwan due to increasing tensions between the Chinese Nationalists and Chinese Communists.
- June 1964–January 1965: The squadron participated in Operation Yankee Team, flying Rescue Combat Air Patrols in South Vietnam and Laos.
- 5 August 1964: VA-145 participated in Operation Pierce Arrow, air strikes against North Vietnam in retaliation for the attacks on the American destroyers USS Turner Joy and USS Maddox in the Gulf of Tonkin on 4 August. The squadron’s Skyraiders, along with other aircraft from the air wing, struck torpedo boats and other targets at Hon Gay, North Vietnam. A second sortie of squadron aircraft, along with A-4 Skyhawks from VA-144, attacked five enemy naval vessels that were at sea, near the Lach Chao Estuary and Hon Me Island. The two vessels attacked by VA-145 were left dead in the water and smoking. During this attack Lieutenant (jg) Richard C. Sather was shot down. He was the first naval aviator killed in the Vietnam War.
- 31 January 1966: The squadron’s commanding officer, Commander H. F. Griffith, was awarded the Silver Star for his actions as a flight leader directing and coordinating simultaneous attacks, under extremely adverse weather conditions, against a heavily defended primary enemy line of communications and for his participation in the successful rescue of a downed naval aviator.
- 1 February 1966: During one of the squadron’s combat missions over North Vietnam, Lieutenant (jg) Dieter Dengler was shot down. He was captured in Laos and imprisoned. On 30 June 1966 he escaped from a Pathet Lao prisoner-of-war camp, was rescued and returned to the squadron on 21 July. For his daring escape he was awarded the Navy Cross.
- June–November 1967: During 120 days on Yankee Station, the squadron assisted in the recovery of 14 downed airmen, both Navy and Air Force.
- 16 April 1969: USS Enterprise, with VA-145 embarked, departed Yankee Station en route to Korean waters in response to the downing of a VQ-1 EC-121 aircraft by the North Koreans on 15 April. The squadron operated in the Sea of Japan and the Yellow Sea until 11 May.
- December 1972: The squadron participated in Operation Linebacker II, heavy air strikes against targets primarily around Hanoi and Haiphong.
- 15 January 1973: The squadron led the first massive laser-guided bombing attack against targets in North Vietnam. A coordinated strike was launched involving squadron A-6s, which used their Pave Knife Laser Designation System, and A-7s from VA-113 and VA-25. These strikes succeeded in destroying 14 bridges in North Vietnam.
- January–February 1973: Following the ceasefire with North Vietnam on 27 January, the squadron concentrated its attention on strikes against lines-of-communication targets in Laos until an agreement was reached with that country.
- February–March 1973: The squadron flew limited sorties in support of Operation End Sweep, minesweeping operations in North Vietnamese waters.

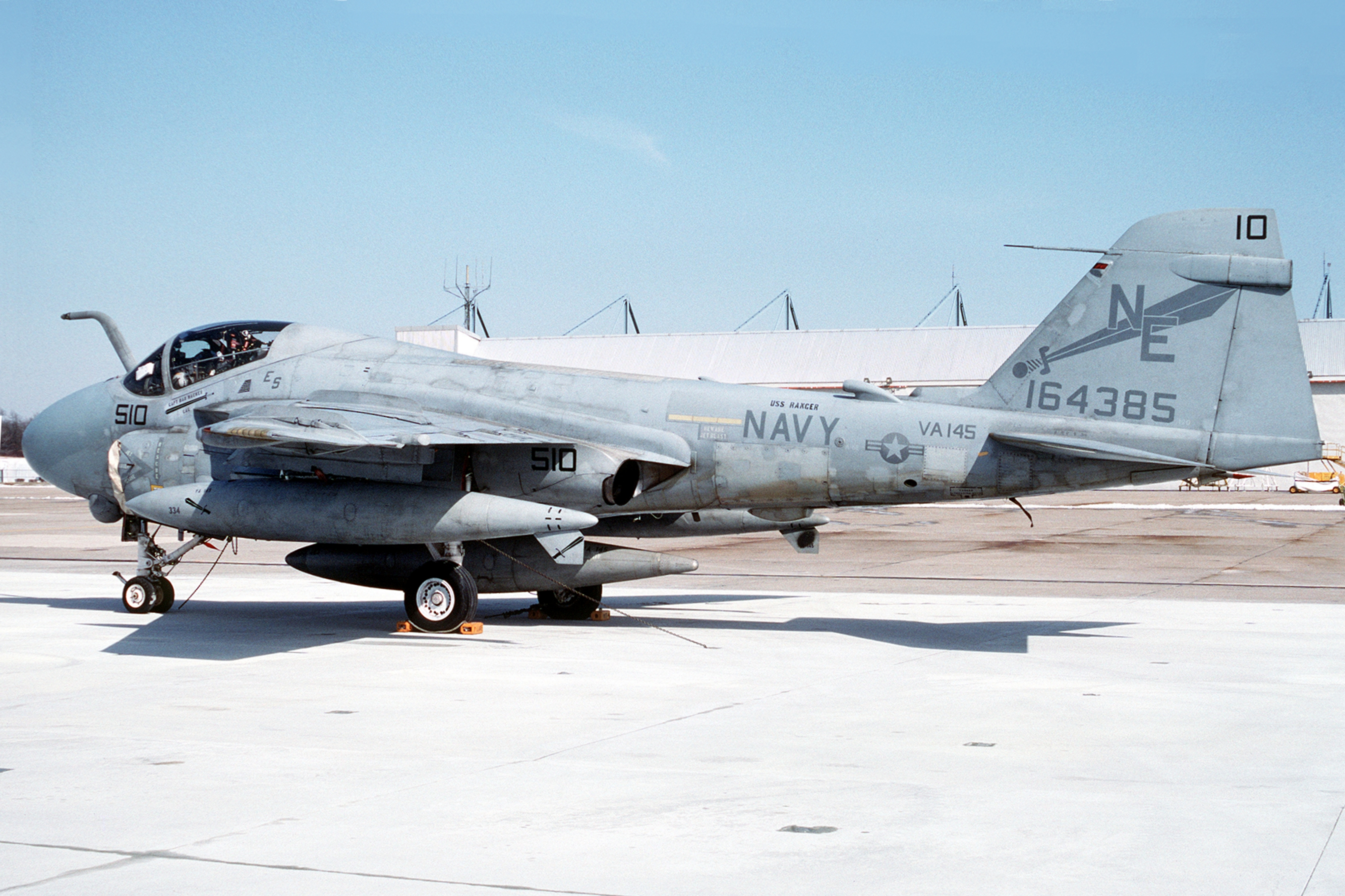
A VA-145 A-6E Intruder in 1992.

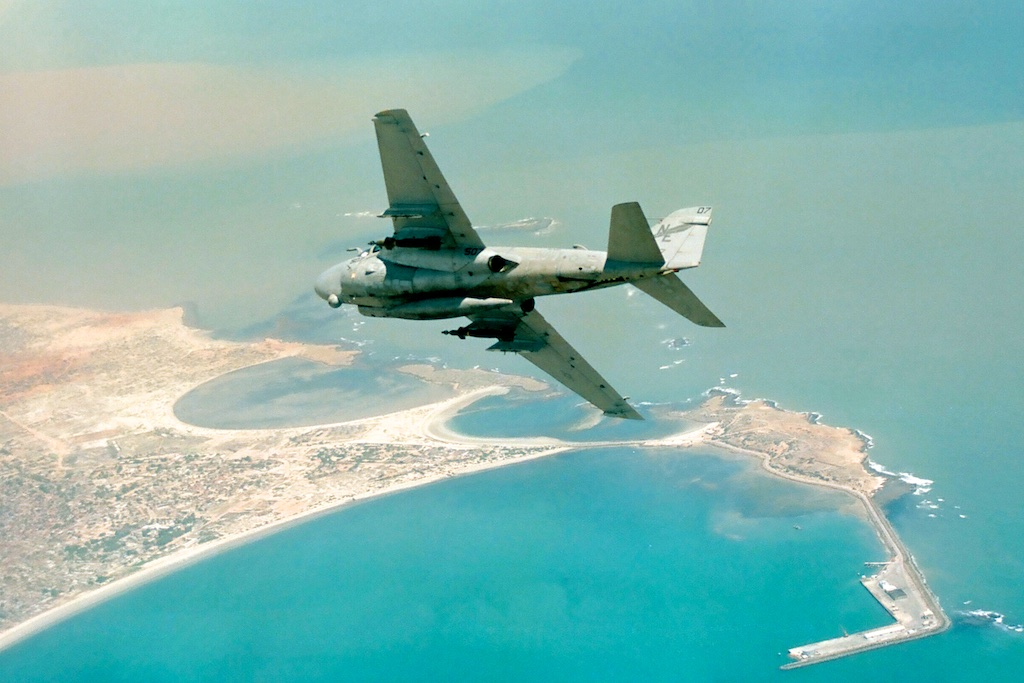
A-6E SWIP Intruder from VA-145 on patrol over Somalia during Operation Restore Hope, December 1992.

- July 1976: Following the Israeli raid on Entebbe and the threatened military operations against Kenya by Uganda, the Ranger, with VA-145 embarked, was ordered to transit from the South China Sea to the western Indian Ocean and operate off the coast of Kenya.
- August–November 1987: The squadron provided support for Operation Earnest Will, the escorting of reflagged Kuwaiti oil tankers through the Persian Gulf.
- October 1987: VA-145 and other assets from CVW-2 provided support for Operation Nimble Archer, retaliatory strikes by surface forces against an Iranian oil platform used as a base by Iranian small boats that were attacking oil tankers.
- August 1989: During a routine mission, a squadron aircraft sighted a foundering Vietnamese refugee boat leading to the rescue of 39 refugees by HS-14 and Ranger.
- 15 January 1991: Ranger, with VA-145 embarked, transited to station in the Persian Gulf.
- 16 January–28 February 1991: The squadron participated in Operation Desert Storm, flying combat missions against targets in Iraq and Kuwait. VA-145 flew 621 combat sorties, striking land based and sea-based targets. Squadron strikes resulted in the destruction of 33 tanks, 1 bridge, 48 artillery pieces, 41 Iraqi naval vessels, 20 ammunition storage bunkers, 3 chemical weapon storage facilities, and 7 command and control sites. All of this was accomplished by the squadron without the loss of a single person or damage to its aircraft.
- 17 September–3 December 1992: Squadron aircraft flew missions in support of Operation Southern Watch. This operation was in support of UN Resolution 688, which demanded that Iraqi government stop the repression of its Shi’ite population in southern Iraq and banned Iraqi planes from flying south of the 32nd parallel.
- 7–18 December 1992: Squadron aircraft flew missions in support of Operation Restore Hope, a UN authorized effort to relieve mass starvation amid factional fighting in Somalia.

== Home port assignments ==
The squadron was assigned to these home ports, effective on the dates shown:

- NAS Dallas – 01 Dec 1949
- NAS San Diego – 28 Jul 1950
- NAS Miramar – Mar 1953
- NAS Moffett Field – May 1962
- NAS Alameda – Sep 1963
- NAS Whidbey Island – 28 Jan 1968

== Aircraft assignment ==
The squadron first received the following aircraft on the dates shown:

- TBM Avenger – 1949
- AD-2 Skyraider – Aug 1950
- AD-4Q Skyraider – Sep 1950
- AD-1 Skyraider – Dec 1951
- AD-4L Skyraider – Apr 1952
- AD-3Q Skyraider – Apr 1953
- AD-4B Skyraider – Apr 1953
- AD-4NA Skyraider – AD-4NA Aug 1954
- AD-5 Skyraider – Oct 1954
- AD-6/AD-1H Skyraider – Feb 1956
- A-6A Intruder – 04 Jun 1968
- A-6B Intruder – 06 Aug 1968
- A-6C Intruder – 11 May 1970
- KA-6D Intruder – 1972
- A-6E Intruder – 22 Sep 1976
- A-6E TRAM Intruder* – 30 Nov 1981

* The A-6E TRAM version was capable of carrying and firing the Harpoon antiship missile.

== See also ==
- List of squadrons in the Dictionary of American Naval Aviation Squadrons
- Attack aircraft
- List of inactive United States Navy aircraft squadrons
- History of the United States Navy
