= VF-114 =

Fighter Squadron 114
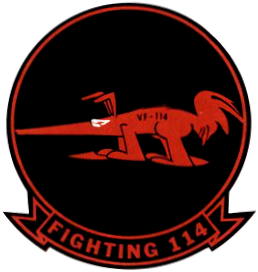
- VF-114 insignia
- Active: 20 January 1945 – 30 April 1993
- Country: United States
- Branch: United States Navy
- Type: Fighter squadron
- Part of: Inactive
- Nickname: Aardvarks
- Mottos: ΠΡΩΤΟΣ ΕΠΙΘΕΣΗ (Prōtos epithesē, Greek: "first in attack")
- Mascot: Zott
- Engagements: Korean War; Vietnam War; Operation Praying Mantis; Operation Classic Resolve

Aircraft flown
- Fighter: F6F Hellcat; F4U Corsair; F9F Panther; F2H Banshee; F3H Demon; F-4 Phantom II; F-14 Tomcat

Fighter Squadron 114 (VF-114) was a fighter squadron of the United States Navy that was active from 1945 through 1993. Nicknamed the "Aardvarks", it was based out of Naval Air Station Miramar, California. The squadron flew combat missions during the Korean War and Vietnam War. VF-114 was disestablished as part of the post-Cold War drawdown of forces on 30 April 1993.

== History ==
=== 1940s ===
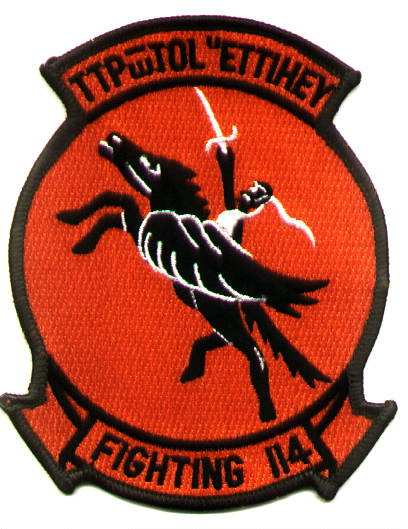
Another version of the badge, with Greek motto misspelled.

VF-114 was established as Bombing Fighter Squadron (VBF-19) on 20 January 1945, at NAS Alameda, California. Soon thereafter, Bombing Fighter Squadron, VBF-19 moved to NAS North Island, California, where it first flew the Grumman F6F Hellcat and then the Vought F4U-4 Corsair. As with many squadrons after World War II, VBF-19 made several designation changes. The first change was two years later, on 24 August 1948 when it became VF-192, and its final change was on 15 February 1950 when it became VF-114. At this time, VF-114 was known as the Executioners.

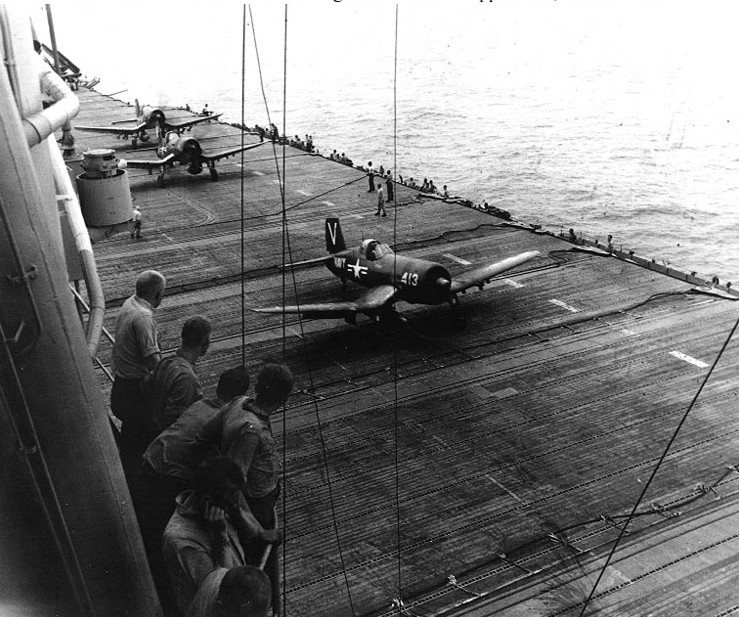
F4U-4B Corsairs taking off from the USS Philippine Sea in 1950

=== 1950s ===
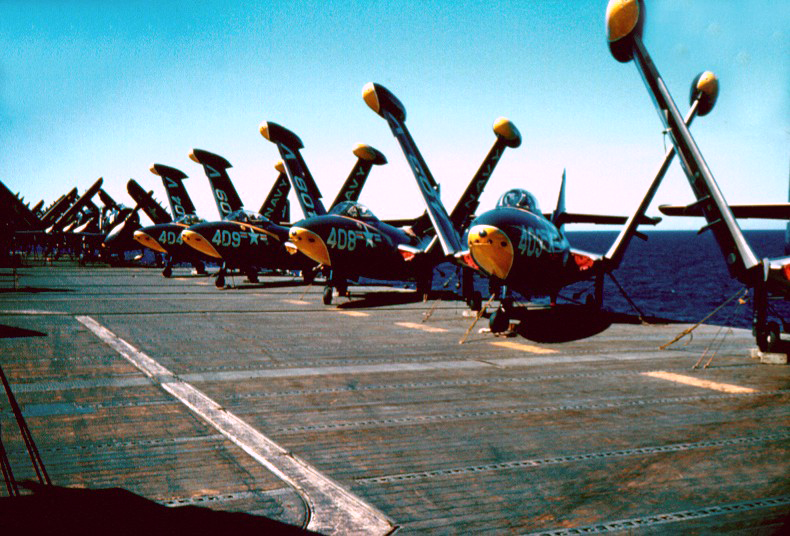
VF-114 F9F-5 Panthers lined up on USS Kearsarge in 1955

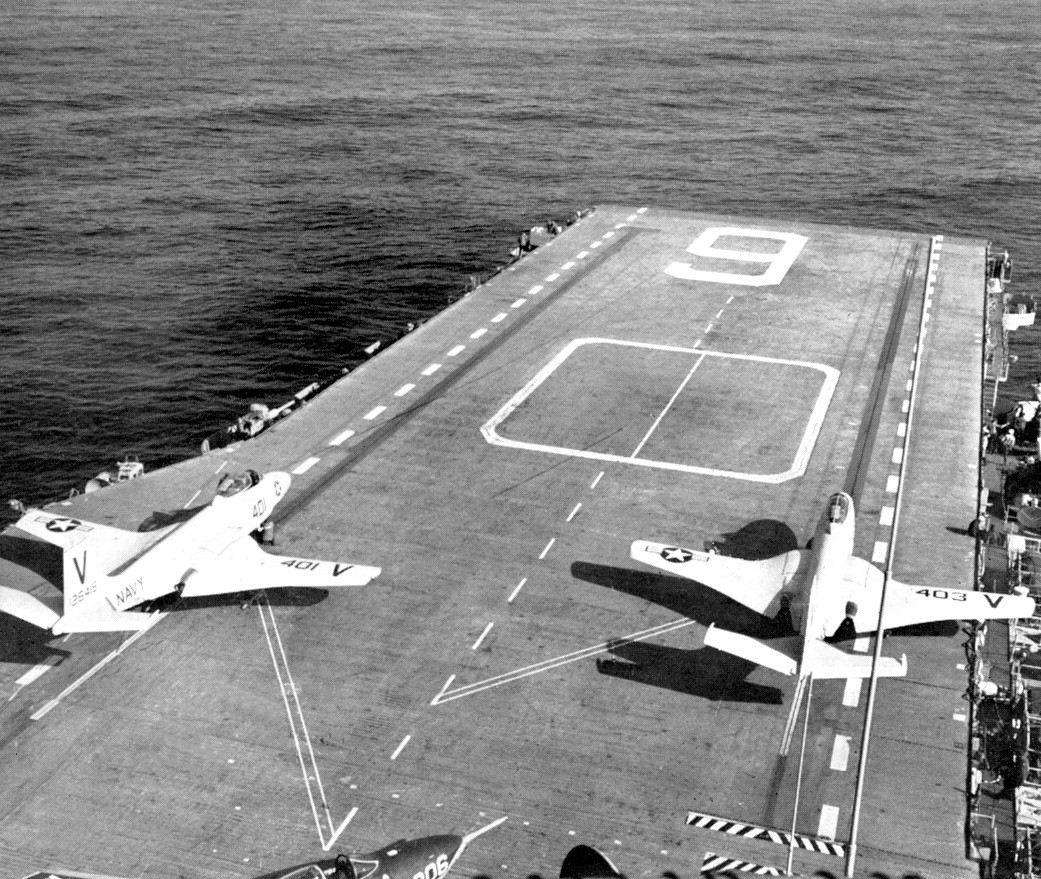
F2H-3 Banshees on the catapults of USS Essex in 1956

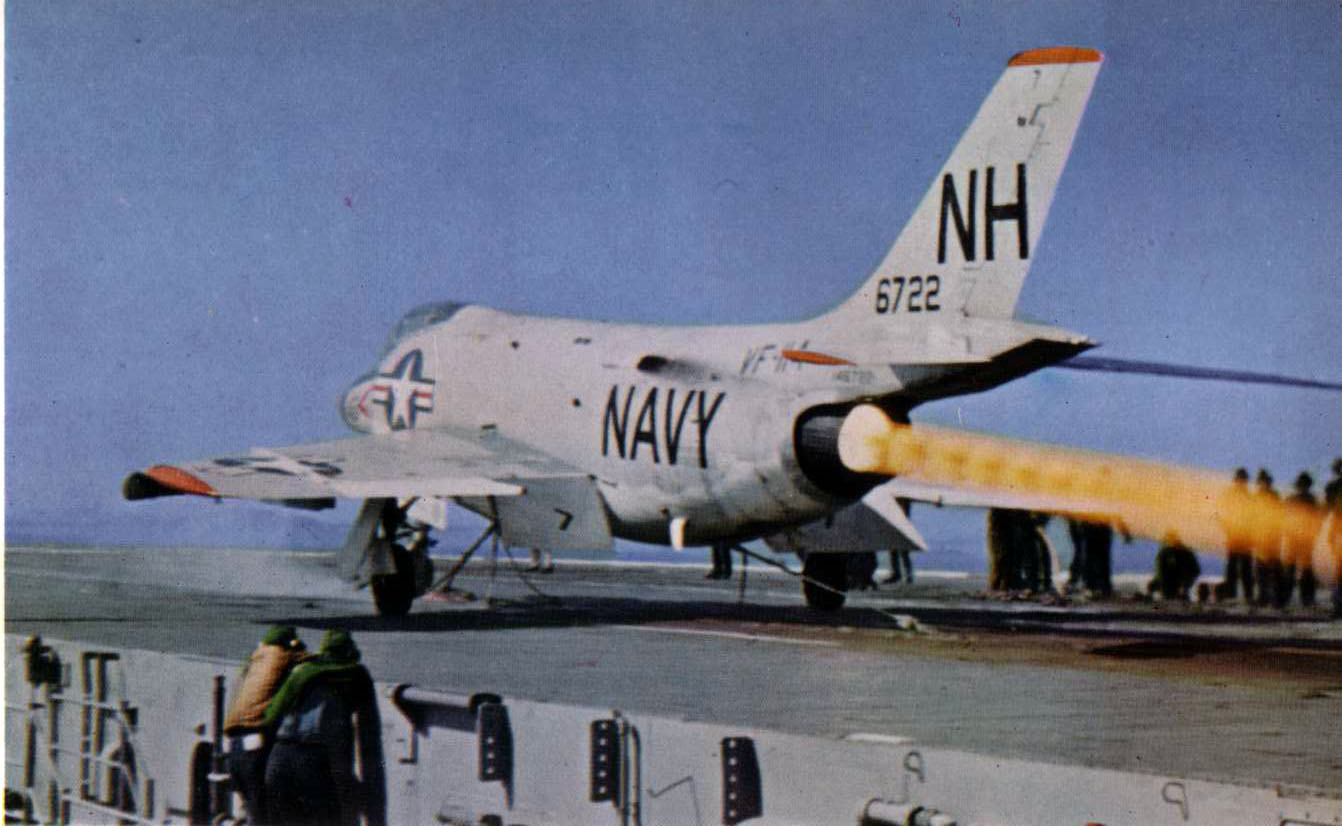
VF-114 F3H-2 launching from USS Hancock in 1960

VF-114 participated in the Korean War deployed on the USS Philippine Sea on 5 July 1950. It flew its Corsairs for several months and conducted over 1,100 strikes against North Korean and Chinese forces.

After its return from Korea, VF-114 moved from propeller aircraft to jets, first flying the Grumman F9F Panther. This was soon followed by the McDonnell F2H Banshee and in 1957 VF-114 transitioned to the McDonnell F3H Demon, the first jet operated by the squadron able to carry air-to-air missiles. Now based at NAS Miramar, California, VF-114 made two cruises on USS Shangri-La and one on USS Hancock.

=== 1960s ===
In 1961, VF-114 transitioned to the McDonnell Douglas F-4 Phantom II, becoming the first deployable Pacific Fleet fighter squadron to do so. At this point, VF-114 also changed its name and insignia to an Aardvark, apparently inspired by the resemblance between the F-4 and the cartoon character Aardvark in the "B.C." comic strip. This change became official in 1963.

At some point the squadron had a 2-foot replica of "B.C." comic's aardvark created, which was named "Zott" (for the sound the aardvark made in the comic) and proudly displayed in the squadron's ready room afloat and ashore. Zott was also said to be the squadron's "Watchvark," guarding against intruders from other squadrons.

VF-114's first cruise with the F-4 began in September 1962 as part of CVW-11 on board the USS Kitty Hawk. LT Felix E. Templeton, VF-114, flying an F-4B, made the ship's 16,000th trap, in Aircraft No. 401, on 17 Aug 1963.

=== Vietnam War ===
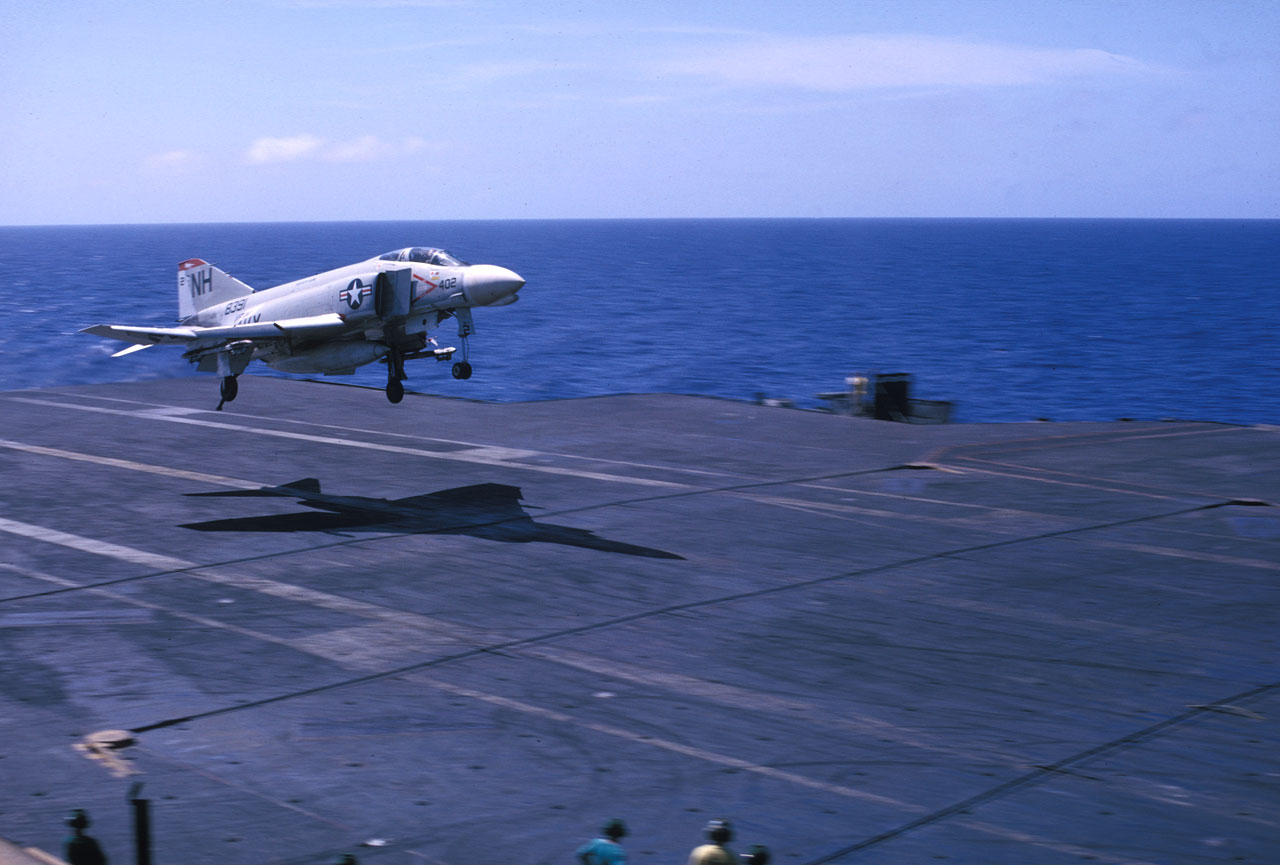
VF-114 F-4B returning to USS Kitty Hawk (CV-63) from a strike mission in 1966

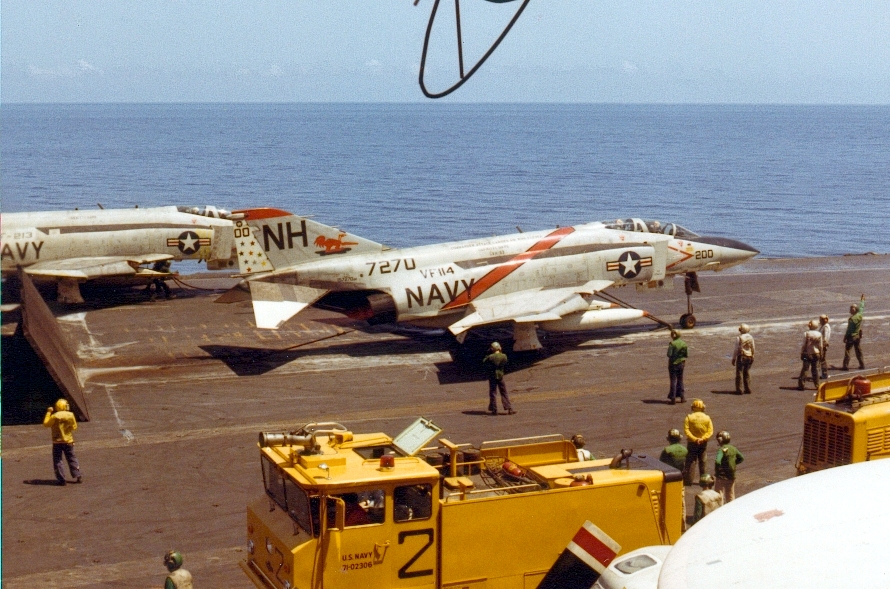
VF-114 F-4J "CAG bird" on USS Kitty Hawk in 1970

Between 1963 and 1975, VF-114 made nine cruises to Vietnam and the Western Pacific, all aboard the USS Kitty Hawk as follows:

- From 17 October 1963 to 20 July 1964, VF-114 equipped with F-4Bs.
- From 19 October 1965 to 13 June 1966. On 2 December F-4B BuNo 152220 was lost over North Vietnam, both crewmen CDR C Austin and LTJG J Logan were killed in action, body not recovered. On 31 January F-4B BuNo 152233 was hit by antiaircraft fire over Laos, both crewmen ejected successfully and were rescued. On 5 March F-4B #152224 was hit by target debris over South Vietnam, both crewmen ejected successfully and were rescued. On 3 April, Lt. Felix Templeton of VF-114, flying an F4B Phantom, became Kitty Hawk's first triple Centurion by making his 300th arrested landing aboard ship. On 26 April F-4B BuNo 152255 was hit by target debris over North Vietnam, both crewmen ejected successfully and were rescued.
- From 5 November 1966 to 19 June 1967. On 20 December a squadron aircraft with an F-4B from VF-213 shot down two Vietnam People's Air Force (VPAF) Antonov An-2 with AIM-7 Sparrow missiles. On 19 January F-4B BuNo 153029 was lost and both crewmen were killed. On 6 April F-4B BuNo 152999 was lost, both crewmen ejected successfully and were rescued. On 24 April squadron aircraft shot down two VPAF MiG-17s with AIM-9 Sidewinder missiles, while one of the F-4Bs was hit by antiaircraft fire, both crewmen ejected successfully and were rescued. On 8 May F-4B suffered an engine loss on launch, the pilot ejected successfully and was rescued but the Radar Intercept Officer LTJG Thomas Steimer was killed in action, body not recovered. On 14 May F-4B BuNo 153001 was lost due to a defective Zuni rocket, both crewmen, LCDR C Southwick and LT D Rollins ejected successfully, were captured and released on 4 March 1973. On 19 May F-4B BuNo 153004 was hit by an SA-2, both crewmen, LT C Plumb and LCDR G Anderson ejected successfully, were captured and respectively released on 18 February and 4 March 1973. On 21 May F-4B BuNo 153040 was lost, both crewmen ejected successfully and were rescued.
- From 18 November 1967 to 28 June 1968. On 27 December F-4B BuNo 153005 was lost over North Vietnam, both crewmen LCDR L Lee and LTJG R Innes were killed, their remains were identified in July 1997. On 15 April F-4Bs BuNo 153002 and BuNo 153043 were lost in a mid-ar collision, all crewmen ejected successfully and were rescued. On 20 April F-4B BuNo 153003 was lost, both crewmen ejected successfully and were rescued.
- From 30 December 1968 to 4 September 1969. On 13 March F-4B BuNo 153018 was lost, both crewmen ejected successfully and were rescued.
- From 6 November 1970 to 17 July 1971, reequipped with F-4Js.
- From 17 February to 20 November 1972. On 14 April F-4J BuNo 157252 was hit by antiaircraft fire over South Vietnam, the pilot LTJG J Greenleaf was killed in action, body not recovered, while the remains of the Radar Intercept Officer LT C McKinney were identified in August 1985. On 6 May, squadron aircraft shot down 2 VPAF MiG-21s with AIM-9s. On 16 August F-4J BuNo 157262 was hit by an SA-2, both crewmen CDR J Pitzen and LT O Pender were killed and their remains were identified in November 1994.
- From 23 November 1973 to 9 July 1974.
- From 21 May to 15 December 1975.

=== 1970s ===
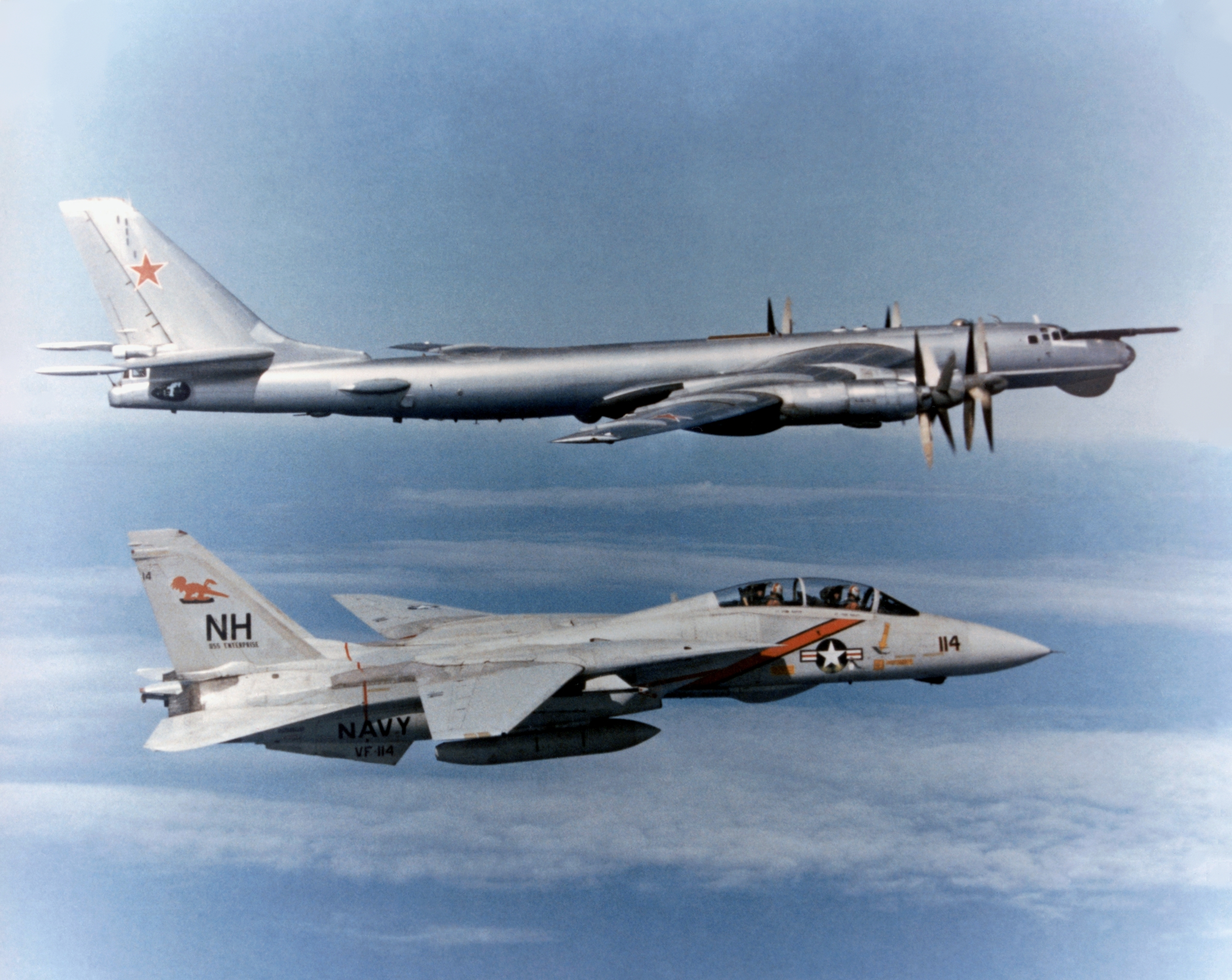
VF-114 F-14A escorts a Soviet Tu-95 in 1983

On 15 December 1975, VF-114 transitioned to the Grumman F-14 Tomcat along with its sister squadron VF-213. This transition took a little more than a year and in October 1977 the squadron deployed with its F-14s for the first time, once again to the Western Pacific on the USS Kitty Hawk with CVW-11 and VF-213.

In March 1979, CVW-11 deployed aboard the USS America in a Mediterranean cruise, which was something of an oddity for a west coast-based carrier air wing, and a second cruise followed in 1981. On both these deployments VF-114 captured the Golden Tailhook award, which is given to the squadron that has the highest landing score for a cruise. VF-114 also won the west coast "High Noon" aerial gunnery competition and the "Mutha" trophy in 1982, which signified it as the best Pacific Fleet squadron.

=== 1980s ===
After its two Mediterranean cruises, VF-114 returned to the Pacific Fleet in September 1982 aboard the USS Enterprise. During this cruise, VF-114 participated in one of the largest naval exercises since World War II when it joined up with the carrier groups of USS Midway and USS Coral Sea in the Northern Pacific for two weeks. After its return to NAS Miramar, VF-114 once again won the "High Noon" and "Mutha" trophies, the first time that an F-14 squadron had won both these awards two years in a row.

The squadron returned to sea on 30 May 1984, under the leadership of CDR Lyle "Ho Chi" Bien and returned home on 20 December. During the cruise, the squadron and the air wing participated in several exercises, such as the Rim of the Pacific (RIMPAC) exercise off of Hawaii and exercise Beacon Flash in the northern Philippines. Once again, the Aardvarks took part in yet another Fleet exercise in the Northern Pacific, this time with the carriers USS Midway and USS Carl Vinson.

In 1985, VF-114 conducted its Inter-Deployment Training Cycle (IDTC) at NAS Miramar in preparation for its next overseas deployment. During this period, in addition to regular at sea periods in the Southern California (SOCAL) Operational Area, the squadron also conducted extensive air combat training against other Navy squadrons as well as various United States Air Force fighter and United States Marine Corps fighter attack squadrons. On 24 January 1986, under the leadership of CDR Pat "Killa" Kilkenny, the squadron's next overseas deployment began on board USS Enterprise which ventured out to the Western Pacific, including stops at Pearl Harbor and Subic Bay in the Philippines. Continuing into the Indian Ocean, VF-114 often intercepted and shadowed Soviet and Indian aircraft. During this time, with operations against Libya by the National Command Authority taking center stage, the decision was made to move the Enterprise carrier battle group to the Mediterranean Sea. To do this, the battle group transited through the Suez Canal, making USS Enterprise the first nuclear powered aircraft carrier to do so. Upon arrival in the Gulf of Sidra and in the vicinity of the "Line of Death", so named by Libyan strongman Muammar al-Gaddafi, CVW-11 fighter and strike fighter aircraft flew combat air patrols for two months, although encounters with Libyan aircraft were rare. The carrier group made subsequent port visits to Naples and Toulon, and instead of returning through the Suez Canal, transited through the Strait of Gibraltar into the Atlantic, and then past the Cape of Good Hope before continuing on to Perth, Australia for another port visit before continuing across the Pacific to its home port at Naval Air Station Alameda.

1987 was devoted to training which included deployments to NAF El Centro, California and NAS Fallon, Nevada. VF-114 again won the "Mutha" trophy and also the Naval Air Force Pacific Fleet Battle "E" battle efficiency award as the top F-14 squadron in the Pacific Fleet. In January 1988, the squadron's next cruise began, a portion of which was spent in the Persian Gulf escorting reflagged tankers through March, April and May due to the ongoing tanker war. In April 1988, VF-114 participated in Operation Praying Mantis. By February 1989, the carrier had returned to port and VF-114 began a compressed turnaround schedule, due to its next cruise beginning in September 1989. Even with the restricted time period, VF-114 was able to fit in significant training, deploying to NAF El Centro for FFARP (Fleet Fighter ACM Readiness Program) and as part of the air wing to NAS Fallon. Once on board the USS Enterprise, an around-the-world cruise began as the battle group took part in exercises around the globe concurrent with the Enterprise's transfer from the Pacific Fleet to the Atlantic Fleet and new homeport in Norfolk, Virginia. October saw VF-114 set a new flight record for an F-14 squadron, logging more than 811 hours in a single month. In December 1989, the squadron participated in Operation Classic Resolve, providing support for the Philippine government during a coup attempt. The end of this cruise saw the end of CVW-11's long attachment to the USS Enterprise, for its next cruise was to be on the Pacific Fleet's newest carrier, the USS Abraham Lincoln.

=== 1990s ===
VF-114 arrived on board the USS Abraham Lincoln on 25 September 1990, while she was making her maiden voyage from Norfolk to Alameda, due to become her new home. The trip took six weeks and saw the carrier cruise round the tip of South America, arriving at her new home in late November 1990. The first long-term deployment on Lincoln began in the middle of 1991, during the early part of the cruise the carrier and air wing were involved in the evacuation of thousands of military personnel and dependents from the Philippine Islands in the wake of the Mount Pinatubo eruption. Once this was complete the Lincoln headed for the Persian Gulf.

Although the initial plans had been for the Lincoln to be among the first relief carriers for those involved in Operation 'Desert Storm', by the time of her arrival the conflict was over and VF-114, along with the rest of CVW-11, was redirected to conduct post-ceasefire combat air patrols.

Commanded by CDR J.R. Barnett with his exec, LCDR (CDR sel) J.S. Colvard, VF-114's final flight took place on 30 November 1992. Like almost half of the F-14 community following Operation 'Desert Storm', VF-114 was disestablished as part of post-Cold War reductions in Naval Aviation. VF-114 was officially disestablished in a final ceremony at NAS Miramar on 30 April 1993.

== In popular culture ==
"VF-114" emblem from Top Gun

VF-114 is prominently featured in the 1986 movie Top Gun, which opens with footage of F-14s from VF-114 and VF-213 taking off on the USS Enterprise. A fictionalized version of the unit also appears in the story, as Top Gun instructor Rick "Jester" Heatherly (portrayed by Michael Ironside) wears a squadron patch featuring a mashup of the VF-213 "Blacklion" emblem and the designation VF-114.

== See also ==
- History of the United States Navy
- List of inactive United States Navy aircraft squadrons
- List of United States Navy aircraft squadrons
