= VFA-213 =

Strike Fighter Squadron 213
- VFA-213 insignia
- Active: 22 June 1955; 71 years ago
- Country: United States
- Branch: United States Navy
- Type: Fighter/Attack
- Role: Close air support Air interdiction Aerial reconnaissance
- Part of: Carrier Air Wing Eight
- Garrison/HQ: NAS Oceana
- Nickname: "Blacklions"
- Motto: Audentes Fortuna Juvat ("Fortune Favors the Bold")
- Engagements: Second Taiwan Strait Crisis; Vietnam War; Operation Praying Mantis; Operation Classic Resolve; Operation Restore Hope; Operation Southern Watch; Operation Desert Fox; Operation Enduring Freedom; Iraq War; Operation Inherent Resolve; Operation Southern Spear; Operation Epic Fury

Commanders
- Current commander: CDR Adam Jackson

Aircraft flown
- Fighter: F2H Banshee; F4D Skyray; F3H Demon; F-4 Phantom II; F-14 Tomcat; F/A-18F Super Hornet

Strike Fighter Squadron 213 (VF-213)-(VFA-213), also known as the Blacklions, is a renowned United States Navy fighter squadron. Established in 1955, the squadron operated a variety of aircraft over its history, beginning with the McDonnell F2H Banshee. Subsequent aircraft included the McDonnell Douglas F-4 Phantom II and the Grumman F-14 Tomcat, which they flew until their transition over to the F/A-18F Super Hornet. The squadron's radio callsign is Lion and their tail code is AJ.

== History ==
=== 1950s ===
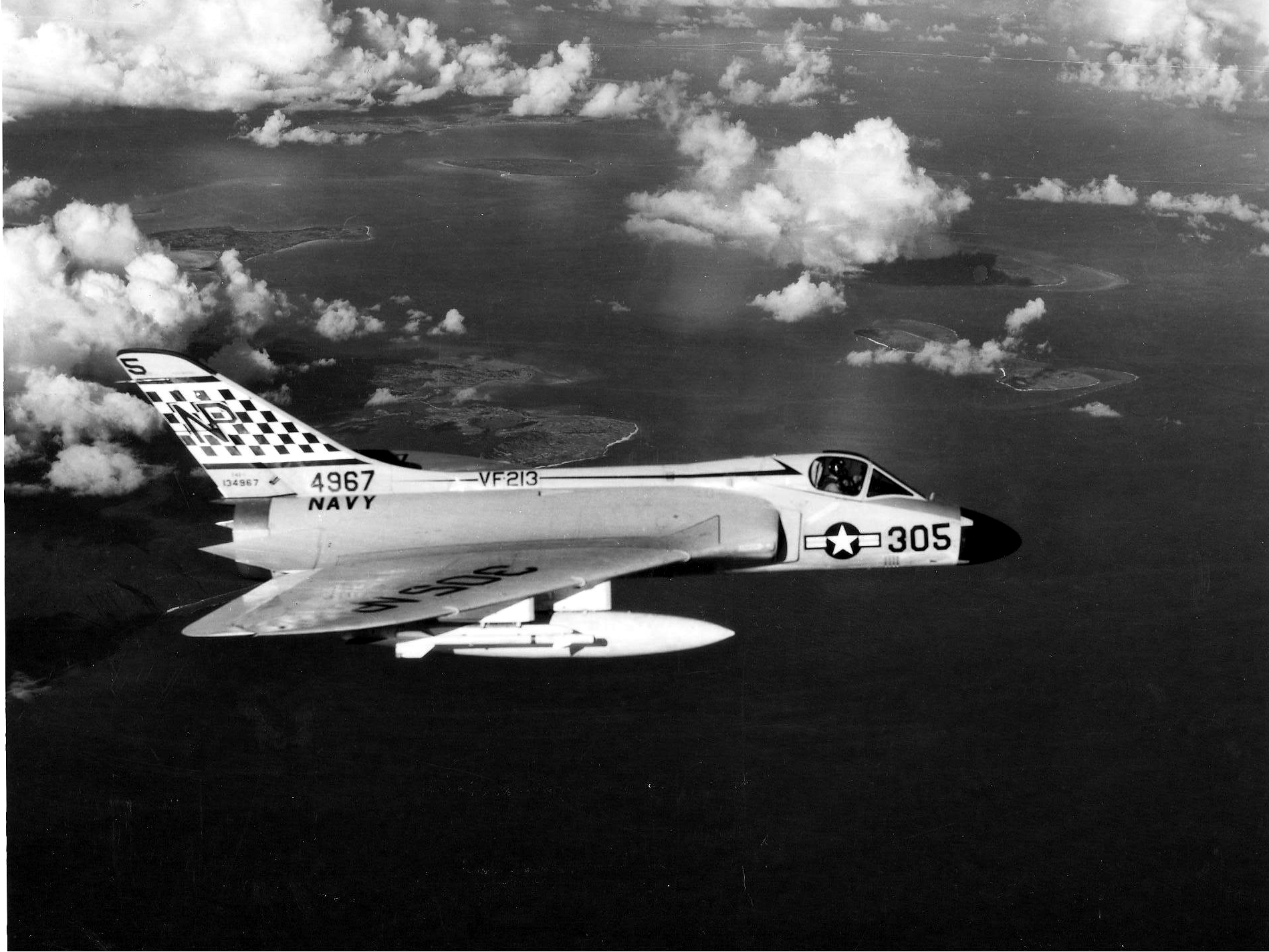
VF-213 F4D-1 Skyray in flight off Taiwan 1958

Original VF-213 squadron insignia

Fighter Squadron Two One Three (VF-213) was established on 22 June 1955 at NAS Moffett Field, California. The first cruise was aboard USS Bon Homme Richard flying the F2H Banshee. When they returned, they transitioned to the F4D Skyray which they flew for two deployments on USS Lexington. They then transitioned to the F3H Demon, which gave the squadron the capability to fire the newly deployed AIM-7 Sparrow air-to-air missile. VF-213 deployed next for a third cruise aboard USS Lexington.

=== 1960s ===
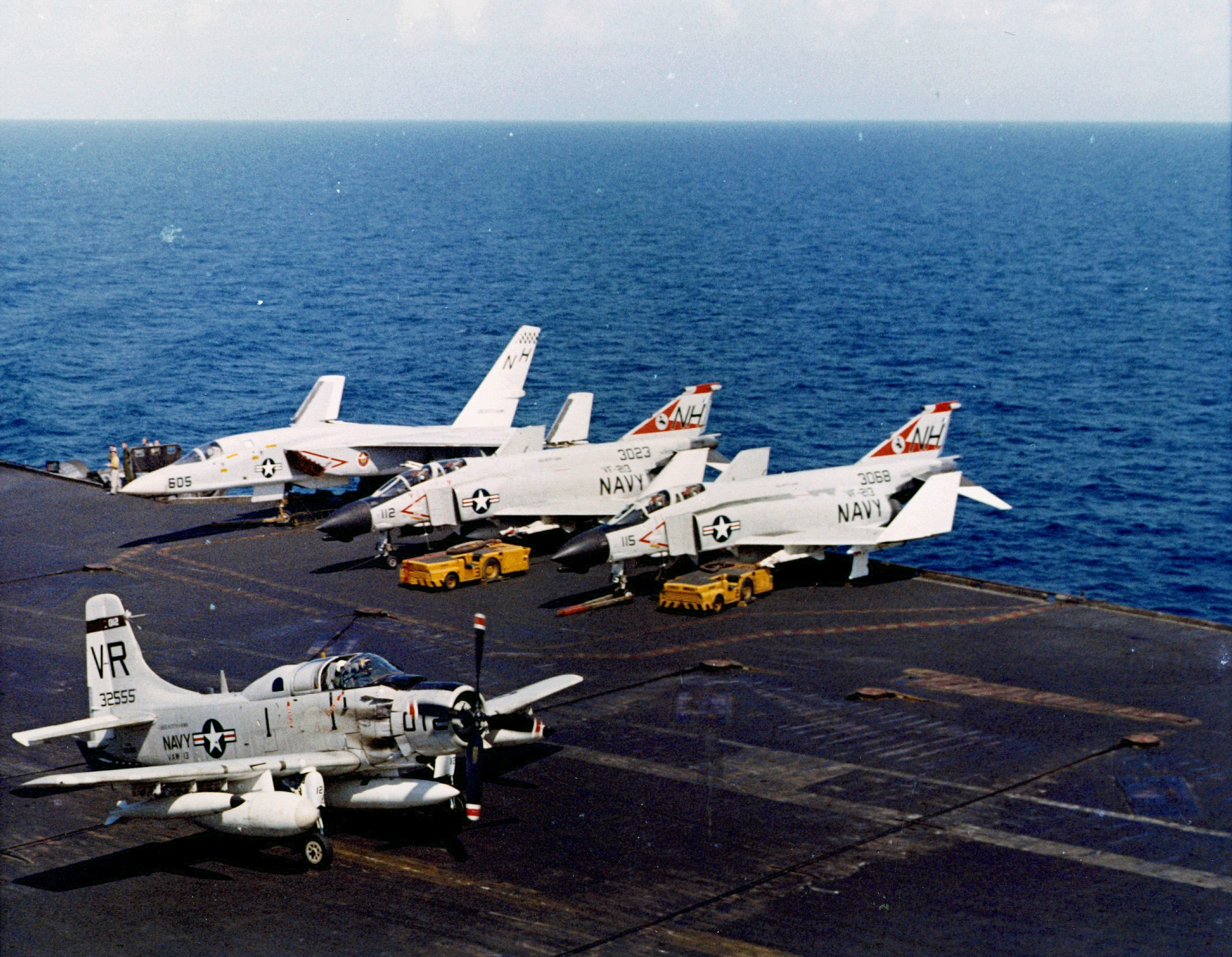
VF-213 F-4s on USS Kitty Hawk in 1968

In June 1961, VF-213 moved to NAS Miramar, which became their home for the next 36 years. Three years later, in February 1964, VF-213 accepting the first of their new F-4B Phantom IIs.

=== Vietnam War ===
In November 1965, VFA-213 joined Attack Carrier Air Wing 11 (CVW-11) and made 9 deployments to Vietnam and the Western Pacific aboard USS Kitty Hawk as follows:

- From 17 October 1963 to 20 July 1964, equipped with F-4Bs.
- From 19 October 1965 to 13 June 1966. On 28 April F-4B #150645 was hit by antiaircraft fire over North Vietnam, both crewmen ejected successfully and were rescued. On 18 May F-4B #152257 was hit by antiaircraft fire near the Mu Gia Pass, both crewmen ejected successfully and were rescued.
- From 5 November 1966 to 19 June 1967. On 20 December a squadron aircraft and one from VF-114 shot down two Vietnam People's Air Force (VPAF) Antonov An-2 with AIM-7 Sparrow missiles. On 4 February F-4B #153007 was hit by antiaircraft fire over North Vietnam, both crewmen LT Donald Thompson and LT Allan Collamore were killed, their remains were identified in February 2001.
- From 18 November 1967 to 28 June 1968.
- From 30 December 1968 to 4 September 1969. On 3 July F-4B #153015 was lost, both crewmen ejected successfully and were rescued.
- From 6 November 1970 to 17 July 1971, reequipped with F-4Js.
- From 17 February to 20 November 1972. On 18 June F-4J #157273 was hit by antiaircraft fire, both crewmen ejected successfully and were rescued.
- From 23 November 1973 to 9 July 1974.
- From 21 May to 15 December 1975.

=== 1970s ===
In September 1976, VF-213 began the transition to the F-14A Tomcat. The first cruise with the F-14 was with CVW-11 aboard USS Kitty Hawk in October 1977. After the Kitty Hawk cruise, the carrier air wing switched to USS America and took part in two Mediterranean cruises in 1979 with John Monroe "Hawk" Smith as CO and 1981.

=== 1980s ===
In December 1981, VF-213 added a new mission as they began training with the Tactical Air Reconnaissance Pod System (TARPS) and in September 1982, VF-213 deployed aboard USS Enterprise. During Indian Ocean operations, the squadron achieved a new milestone by flying the longest Tomcat flight from a carrier on a 1,775-mile (2,857 km) TARPS mission.

In 1985, they were mobilized for the filming of Top Gun on the USS Enterprise (CVN-65) for takeoffs & landings and AIM-9 Sidewinder & AIM-7 Sparrow firing scenes.

On 24 January 1986 they were deployed with USS Enterprise (CVN-65) to the Western Pacific and the Indian Ocean, where VF-213 often intercepted Soviet and Indian aircraft. During this deployment, tensions between the U.S. and Libya escalated, necessitating the decision to move USS Enterprise through the Suez Canal to the Mediterranean Sea. Upon arrival in the Gulf of Sidra CVW-11 aircraft flew patrols for two months, although encounters with Libyan aircraft were rare. The ship transited the Strait of Gibraltar and around the Cape of Good Hope before continuing onto Perth, Australia and across the Pacific to their home port.

1988 saw VF-213 flying cover over reflagged oil tankers in the Persian Gulf and participating in Operation Praying Mantis. In 1990 VF-213 and the rest of the air wing switched aircraft carriers to USS Abraham Lincoln. The first cruise on USS Abraham Lincoln was a six-week transit from NAS Norfolk to NAS Alameda, via Cape Horn.

The squadron won the "BOOLA BOOLA" award in March 1989 for their professional completion of all missile test firings. In late 1989, VF-213 and CVW-11 went around the world on USS Enterprise for a WESTPAC deployment ending at NAS Norfolk for refurbishment. In December 1989, the squadron participated in Operation Classic Resolve on the Enterprise, providing support for the Philippine government during a coup attempt.

=== 1990s ===
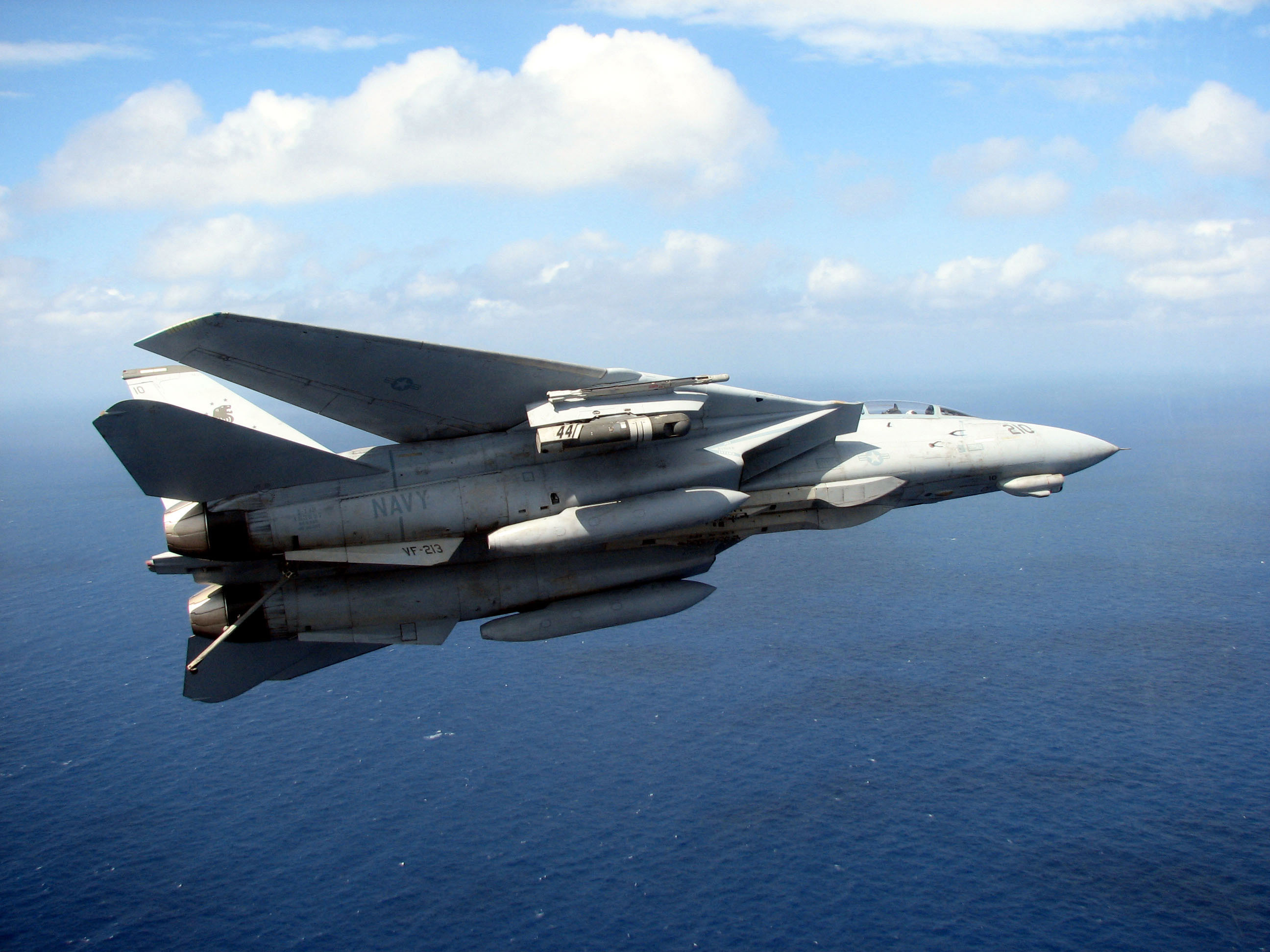
VF-213 F-14D carrying a LANTIRN pod

The squadron deployed to WestPac on USS Abraham Lincoln in May 1991 in support of UN sanctions against Iraq. VF-213 flew combat air patrol and TARPS missions, recording the devastation of Kuwait oil fields. In 1993, VF-213 became the sole F-14 squadron on Abraham Lincoln. That same year, VF-213 flew in support of Operation Restore Hope in Somalia and Operation Southern Watch over Iraq.

Kara Hultgreen, the first qualified female F-14 pilot in the US Navy, was assigned to VF-213, and on 25 October 1994, her F-14 crashed while on approach to USS Abraham Lincoln. Both she and her RIO ejected, but only the RIO survived.

The 1995 WestPac cruise again saw the squadron flying over the skies of southern Iraq. In 1996, VF-213 moved to USS Kitty Hawk for the 1996–1997 WESTPAC deployment. During this deployment VF-213 fired twenty six AIM-54 Phoenix and six AIM-9 Sidewinder missiles, including one event where six planes launched twelve Phoenix missiles. These mass firings were conducted to reduce the numbers of older Phoenix missiles in inventory, as they were being removed from service.

After the 1997 cruise, VF-213 moved from NAS Miramar to NAS Oceana and transitioned to the F-14D Super Tomcat, becoming the fourth F-14 squadron to receive the D model.

In 1998 they moved to USS Carl Vinson, and began work-ups for their next cruise. During the 1998-1999 deployment, VF-213 was the first squadron to fire an AIM-54C Phoenix with the aircrew on night vision goggles. Two months into the deployment, VF-213 participated in Operation Desert Fox, which was the Navy's largest combat evolution since the Gulf War. This successful deployment included the longest combat line period in over 25 years. F-14Ds from VF-213, as well as the rest of the embarked carrier air wing aboard USS Carl Vinson, joined other US air assets in the final strikes of that operation. Highlights of the cruise included the execution of 19 strikes, dropping 20 laser-guided bombs, supporting 11 combined strikes, flying 70 missions, and logging 230 combat sorties, including 45 reconnaissance missions imaging more than 580 targets.

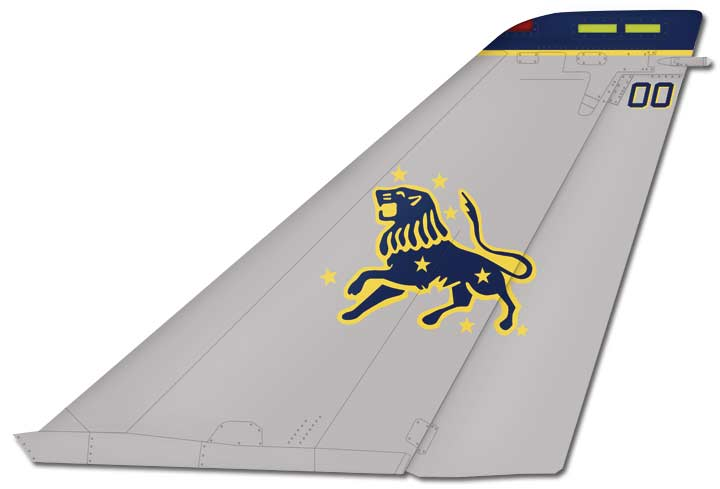
VF-213 F-14 tail markings

On 5 January 1999, two F-14Ds on patrol over Iraq were directed to intercept two Iraqi MiG-25s south of the "no fly zone". The Tomcats fired two AIM-54 missiles, the first ever Phoenix combat-launch by the US Navy. The Iraqi jets turned north and the missiles fell short of their targets. VF-213/CVW-11 returned home in the spring of 1999.

=== 2000s ===
After the September 11 attacks, USS Carl Vinson with CVW-11 was the second carrier battle group after Enterprise on station in the North Arabian Sea, preparing for attacks against Afghanistan. On 7 October 2001 during a CVW-11 strike, VF-213 dropped the first bombs of Operation Enduring Freedom (OEF) on an SA-3 site near Kabul International Airport. VF-213 also conducted reconnaissance, utilizing their TARPS pods, and also provided laser weapon guidance for F/A-18 Hornets and GPS weapons coordinates for Hornets and USAF strike aircraft. During the ten weeks VF-213 were supporting OEF they flew over 500 combat sorties, over 2600 combat flight hours and expended 435,000 pounds of ordnance and provided reconnaissance with their TARPS pods. VF-213 was also the first F-14 unit to use its internal 20 mm cannon in combat during the Battle of Mazar e Sharif VF-213 received the 2001 Commander Naval Air Pacific Fleet Battle "E", Chief of Naval Operations (CNO) Safety "S", Clifton Award and the Commander Fighter Wing Atlantic Golden Wrench for their performance in 2001.

After the 2001 cruise ended in 2002, VF-213 changed air wings from CVW-11 to CVW-8. On 22 March 2003, VF-213 deployed aboard USS Theodore Roosevelt to the Mediterranean Sea in support of Operation Iraqi Freedom. During the war VF-213 would fly 198 strike, combat air patrol and ground forces support missions, delivering 102 laser-guided bombs and 94 JDAM bombs.

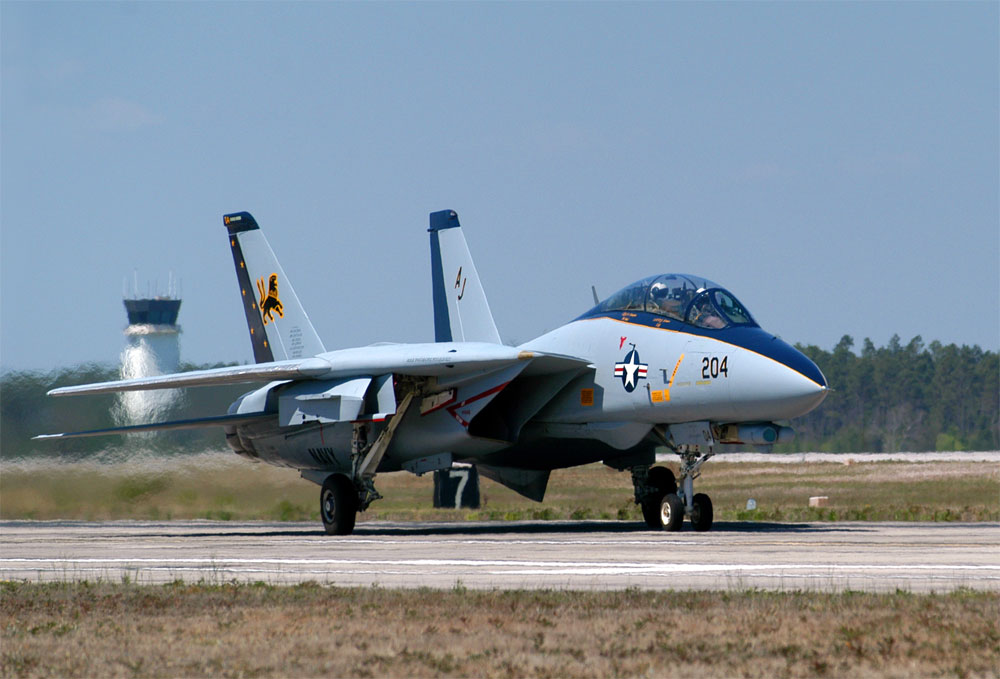
The last US F-14 to fly a combat mission lands at Naval Air Station Pensacola.

VF-213 was paired up with VF-31 for the 2005–2006 final F-14 Tomcat cruise on board USS Theodore Roosevelt. During the cruise, VF-213 and VF-31 received ROVER upgrades to their aircraft, enabling them to transmit real-time images from their LANTIRN sensor to ground operators. VF-31 and 213 collectively completed 1,163 combat sorties, and dropped 9,500 pounds of ordnance during reconnaissance, surveillance, and close air support missions in support of OIF.

On 10 March 2006, VF-213 returned to NAS Oceana after the final F-14 cruise. All 22 Tomcats flew together in a wedge formation over NAS Oceana.

VF-213 began their transition to the F/A-18F Super Hornet in April 2006 and was re-designated VFA-213 on 2 April 2006. VFA-213 was the first Super Hornet squadron to fly AESA-equipped Super Hornets. VFA-213 became the first squadron to receive Dual-Cockpit Cueing System for both pilot and naval flight officer, retrofitted with an aft cockpit Joint Helmet Mounted Cueing System (JHMCS), on 18 May 2007.

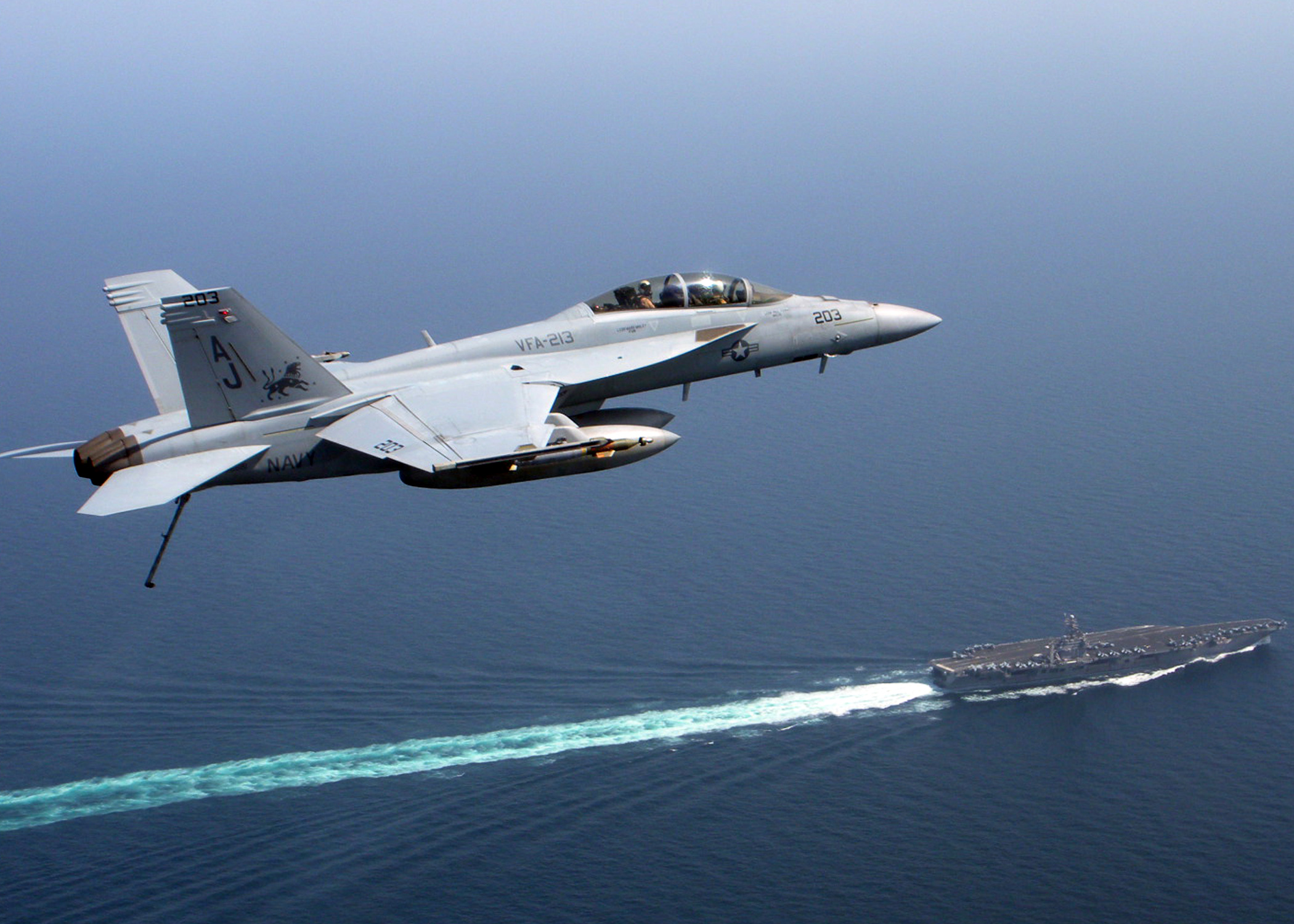
VFA-213 F/A-18F over USS Theodore Roosevelt in 2008

On 13 May 2008 an F/A-18F from the squadron operating from USS Theodore Roosevelt accidentally dropped a 500-pound laser-guided bomb three miles (4.8 km) outside of the Pinecastle bombing range near the Ocala National Forest. The bomb explosion started a wildfire which burned 257 acres (1.04 km^{2}) of vegetation. No one was injured in the blaze, but the emergency response cost $342,946. A Navy investigation determined that technical misunderstandings and crew fatigue contributed to the mishap. The two crew members of the jet were later returned to flying status after a board review.

VFA-213, along with CVW-8 and USS Theodore Roosevelt, participated in Joint Task Force Exercise 08-4 Operation Brimstone off the coast of North Carolina between 21 and 31 July 2008. The British carrier HMS Ark Royal, the amphibious assault ship Iwo Jima with associated units, the Brazilian Navy frigate Greenhalgh, and the French submarine Améthyste also participated in the event.

On 8 September 2008, VFA-213 and the rest of CVW-8 deployed on board USS Theodore Roosevelt on a regularly scheduled deployment. On 4 October the Roosevelt Carrier Group arrived in Cape Town, South Africa, the first visit by a US aircraft carrier since 1967 and three days later the carrier left Cape Town. CVW-8 and CVN-71 supported Operation Enduring Freedom and flew more than 3,100 sorties and dropped more than 59,500 pounds of ordnance while providing close air support for ISAF-forces in Afghanistan.

=== 2010s ===
On 11 May 2011, the squadrons of CVW-8 embarked on USS George H.W. Bush's maiden deployment, scheduled to conduct operations in the US 5th and 6th Fleet areas of operations.

On 27 January 2017, VFA-213 departed on a combat deployment in support of Operation Inherent Resolve (OIR), embarked on board USS George H. W. Bush. From 10 February 2017 to 9 March 2017, the command conducted OIR combat operations from the Mediterranean Sea. VFA-213 resumed combat operations on 23 March 2017 from the Persian Gulf until 22 May 2017.

In January 2018, VFA-213 participated in the initial flight deck certification for the US Navy's newest aircraft carrier, USS Gerald R. Ford.

On 14 March 2018, a Super Hornet from VFA-213 crashed near Key West killing the pilot and naval flight officer.

During April and May 2018, the squadrons of CVW-8 conducted joint operations with French Naval Forces out of NAS Oceana. Following those operations, the air wing and French aircraft embarked on USS George H. W. Bush, conducting strike missions.

In September 2018, VFA-213 attended the Naval Weapons Systems Evaluation Program (NWSEP) out of Tyndall Air Force Base, Florida, with a five aircraft detachment. During the detachment, VFA-213 employed 19 air-to-air missiles, including nine AIM-7 Sparrows, seven AIM-9M Sidewinders, one AIM-9X Sidewinder, and two AIM-9X Block II Sidewinders. Subsequently, the command earned the 2018 Commander, Naval Air Forces Atlantic Grand Slam award for demonstrating the highest capability to maintain and utilize air-to-air missile weapons systems.

=== 2020s ===
In November 2025, VFA-213 within CVW-8 onboard the USS Gerald R Ford were re-tasked from their scheduled deployment in the Mediterranean and sent to the Caribbean to support Operation Southern Spear. After completing their support of Southern Spear in early February 2026, VFA-31 and CVW-8 were again deployed across the Atlantic and into the Mediterranean to support potential combat operations against Iran.

In late Feb 2026, VFA-213 and their F/A-18Fs undertook combat sorties within Operation Epic Fury against Iran. Combat sorties off the Ford began from the Eastern Mediterranean and moved to the Red Sea after close to a week of combat.

== In popular culture ==
"VF-213" emblem from Top Gun

"VF-114" emblem from Top Gun

VF-213 is prominently featured and referenced in the movie Top Gun, which opens with footage of F-14s from VF-213 and VF-114 taking off on the USS Enterprise. A fictional depiction of VF-213 appears in the movie as the squadron of characters Tom "Iceman" Kazansky and Ron "Slider" Kerner (played by Val Kilmer and Rick Rossovich respectively). Despite the fictional squadron's designation, it uses the insignia design of VFA-25, a squadron which never flew the F-14 in real life. Conversely, Top Gun instructor Rick "Jester" Heatherly (portrayed by Michael Ironside) wears a squadron patch featuring the VF-213 Blacklion emblem and the designation VF-114, along with a helmet decorated in VF-213's dark blue with gold stars.

== See also ==
- Naval aviation
- Modern United States Navy carrier air operations
- List of United States Navy aircraft squadrons
- List of inactive United States Navy aircraft squadrons
