= Virginia State Route 25 =

The following highways in Virginia have been known as State Route 25:

- State Route 25 (Virginia pre-1933), early 1920s – 1933, near Washington, D.C.
- U.S. Route 25E (Virginia), 1926–1996
