= VFA-25 =

Strike Fighter Squadron 25
- Founded: 1 January 1943; 83 years ago
- Country: United States
- Branch: United States Navy
- Type: Fighter/Attack
- Role: Close air support Air interdiction Aerial reconnaissance
- Part of: Carrier Air Wing Eleven
- Garrison/HQ: NAS Lemoore
- Nickname: "Fist of the Fleet"
- Colors: Green
- Engagements: World War II; Korean War; Vietnam War; Iran hostage crisis Operation Earnest Will; Operation Desert Shield; Operation Southern Watch; Operation Enduring Freedom; Iraq War; Operation Prosperity Guardian; Operation Poseidon Archer

Commanders
- Commanding Officer: CDR Ryan “Domo” Aldrich
- Executive Officer: CDR Jack "Uncle Rico" Keilty
- Command Master Chief: CMDCM Tony Fortner

Aircraft flown
- Attack: SB2C Helldiver; TBF Avenger; SB2C Helldiver; A-1 Skyraider; A-7 Corsair II
- Fighter: F/A-18 Hornet; F/A-18E/F Super Hornet

Strike Fighter Squadron 25 (VFA-25) is an aviation unit of the United States Navy based at Naval Air Station Lemoore, California. The squadron flies the Boeing F/A-18E Super Hornet and is currently assigned to Carrier Air Wing 11. Its callsign is Fist.

== Squadron insignia and nickname ==
The squadron's first insignia was approved by Chief of Naval Operations (CNO) on 28 September 1944 and was indicative of its mission as a torpedo squadron, consisting of a four-leaf clover, horseshoe and flying torpedo.

A black fist clenching a red lightning bolt on a field of yellow became the squadron's second insignia and has been in use, with some modifications, since CNO approval on 9 June 1949. The fist on the Insignia is actually Zeus' fist from Greek mythology.

On 24 July 1959, CNO approved a modification to the insignia which added a scroll with the designation VA-25.

On 24 January 1974 CNO approved another modification to the insignia, adding three black stars. When the squadron was designated VFA-25 it continued to use the fist and lightning bolt insignia but dropped the three stars. Four stars were again added (date unknown) representing wars in which VFA-25 has flown aircraft into combat: World War II, Korea, Vietnam, and most recently, Iraq.

== History ==
Two US Navy squadrons have held the designation VA-25. The first VA-25 would eventually become VA-65 and is not related to the subject of this article. The second VA-25 has a direct lineage to the current VFA-25 "Fist of the Fleet".

=== 1940s ===
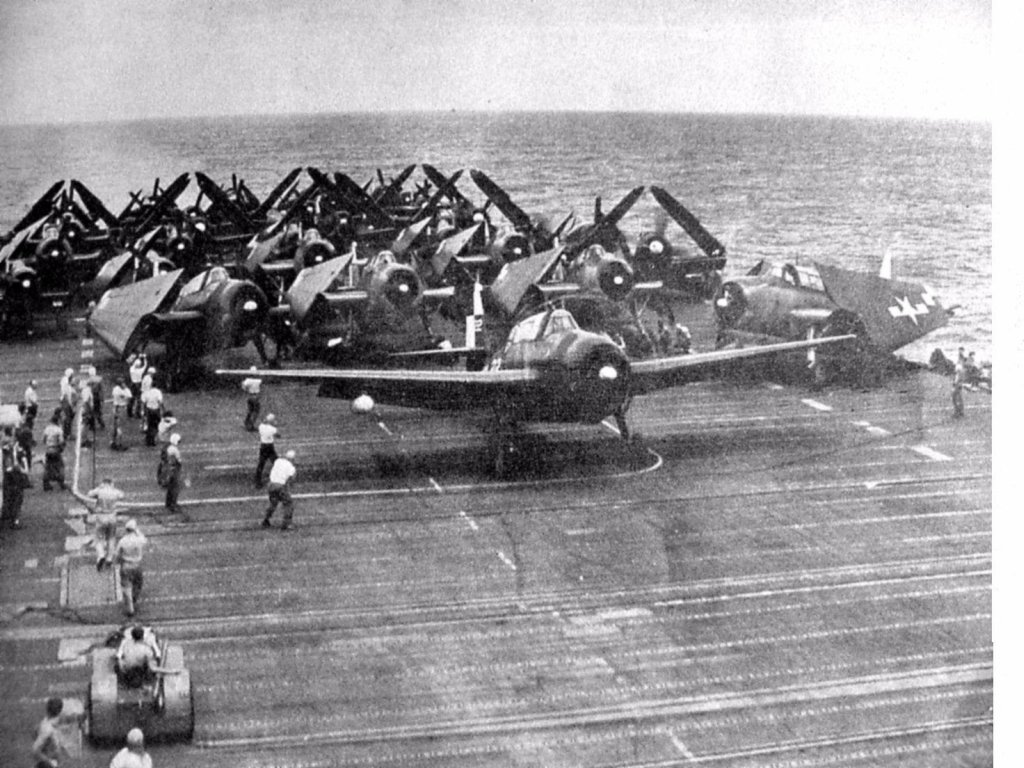
VT-17 TBM-3Es on USS Hornet, 1945

The squadron was originally commissioned as Torpedo Squadron 17 (VT-17) on 1 January 1943 at NAS Norfolk flying the Grumman TBF Avenger. On 10 September 1943 the squadron embarked on the aircraft carrier USS Bunker Hill, en route from Norfolk to Pearl Harbor, Hawaii via the Panama Canal and San Diego, California. On 11 November 1943 the squadron flew its first combat sorties, striking targets in Rabaul. The squadron flew numerous combat missions through February 1944, striking targets in Kavieng, Kwajalein, Eniwetok, Truk and Tinian.

In February 1945, the squadron flew numerous combat missions against targets in Japan and the Bonin Islands and provided ground support for the Invasion of Iwo Jima. In March 1945, VT-17 aircraft struck Japanese ships in the East China Sea, Inland Sea and around the Ryukyu Islands and land based targets in and around Okinawa.

On 7 April 1945, VT-17, along with other units from the task force, attacked a Japanese naval force composed of the super-battleship Yamato and her escorts, scoring several torpedo hits on Yamato and sinking one of her destroyer escorts. From April–June 1945, combat missions were flown against targets in and around Okinawa in preparation for the invasion of that island, targets in and around Kyushu, Shikoku and ships in the East China Sea.

In March 1946 the squadron transitioned to the SB2C Helldiver attack bomber, and was redesignated as VA-6B on 15 November 1946.

On 23 September 1947, the squadron transitioned to the AD-1 Skyraider, affectionately nicknamed the "Spad," the type it would fly for the next 21 years.

The squadron sailed aboard USS Coral Sea on its maiden voyage in early 1948, and was redesignated as VA-65 on 27 July 1948.

From October 27 to November 23, 1949, VA-65 embarked on USS Franklin D. Roosevelt, to the Davis Straits area conducting cold weather exercises.

=== 1950s ===
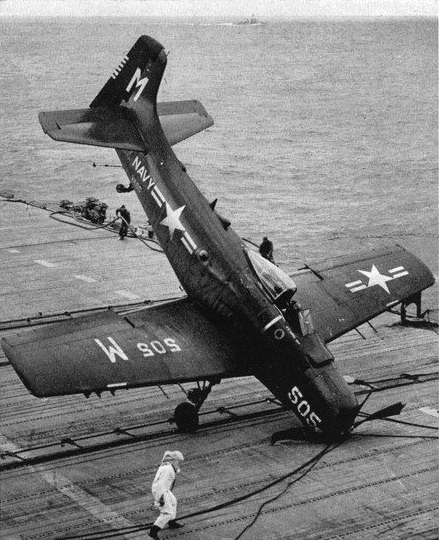
A U.S. Navy Douglas AD-4 Skyraider of Attack Squadron 65 (VA-65) "Fist of the Fleet" hits the barrier with a faulty tailhook aboard the aircraft carrier USS Yorktown (CVA-10). VA-65 was assigned to Carrier Air Group 2 (CVG-2) aboard the Yorktown for a deployment to the Western Pacific from 3 August 1953 to 3 March 1954.

The outbreak of hostilities with which would become the Korean War saw the squadron transferred to NAS Moffett Field, California.

On 15 September 1950, embarked aboard USS Boxer, squadron aircraft participated in combat strikes against shore defenses in and around Incheon, Korea, just before the landings at Incheon. On 1 October 1950, VA-65 aircraft struck the North Korean capital of Pyongyang, hitting the airfield and scoring a direct hit on a large electrical power plant. On 23 June 1952, VA-65's Skyraiders participated in the Attack on the Sui-ho Dam on the Yalu River.

In February 1955, while embarked on USS Essex and operating in the Formosa Straits, the squadron provided air support during the evacuation of Nationalist Chinese forces from the Tachen Islands which had come under bombardment by the People’s Republic of China.

On 1 July 1959 the squadron was redesignated Attack Squadron Twenty-five (VA-25).

=== 1960s ===
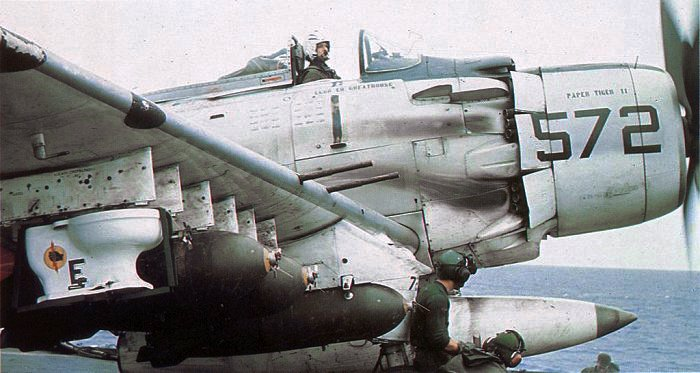
A VA-25 A-1H with a special "bomb" in 1965 on USS Midway. The "bomb" was a damaged toilet which was going to be thrown overboard. One of VA-25's plane captains saved it and the ordnance crew made a rack, tailfins and nose fuse for it.

In March 1961, the squadron, while embarked on USS Midway. operated in the South China Sea during the Laotian crisis.

In 1962, the squadron moved to its current home, the newly completed NAS Lemoore.

From April 1965 through 6 April 1968, the squadron made three deployments in support of the Vietnam War, still flying the A-1. During this period, squadron pilots flew over 3,000 combat missions, dropping more than 10 million pounds of ordnance on enemy targets. On 20 June 1965, four VA-25 "Spads" were engaged by two Vietnamese Mikoyan-Gurevich MiG-17s deep in North Vietnam — two of the squadron pilots were credited with a successful guns kill against one of the jet-powered fighters.

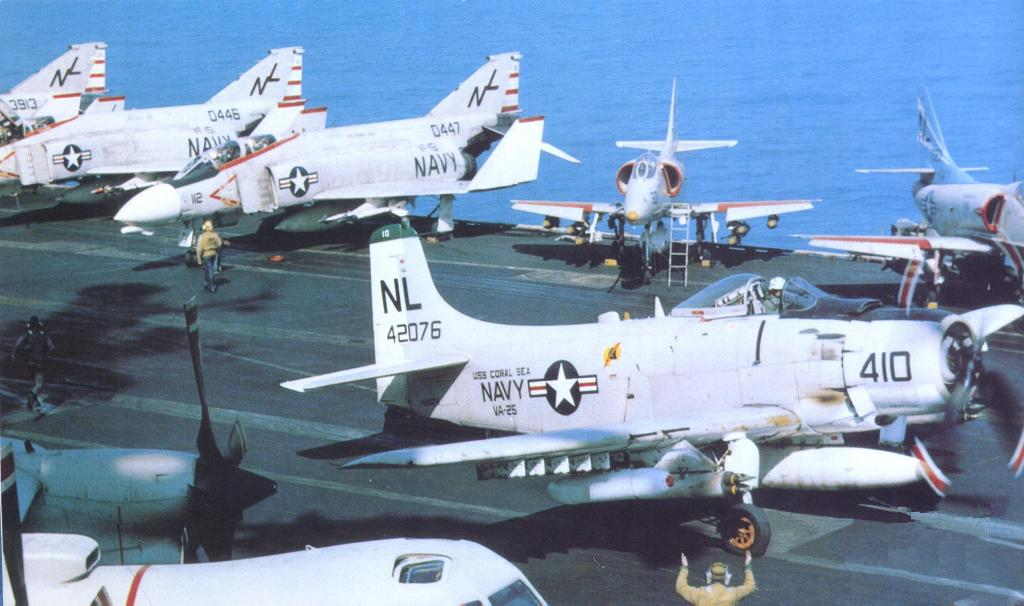
A VA-25 Skyraider armed for a mission over Vietnam, 1966/67

In January 1968, squadron aircraft provided close air support for U.S. Marines besieged at Khe Sanh, South Vietnam.

In October 1968, the squadron, by then the last tactical propeller driven squadron in the Navy, transitioned from the A-1 to the A-7 Corsair II. After only four months of training, the squadron returned to the Vietnam War aboard USS Ticonderoga. It was during this cruise that the squadron set a record — in 33 flying days, pilots flew 1,650 sorties in combat, each averaging over 92 hours in the air.

=== 1970s ===
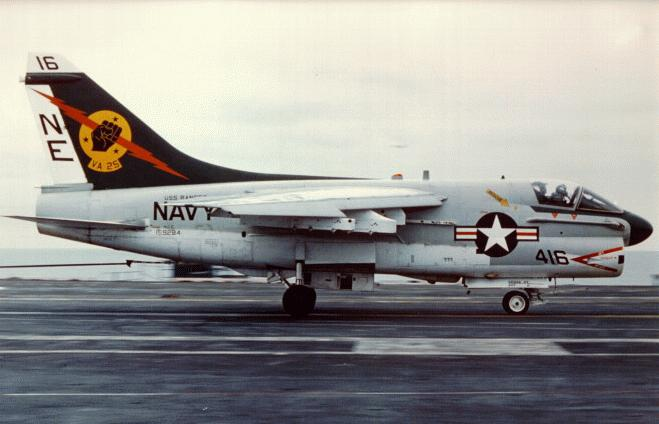
A VA-25 A-7E lands aboard USS Ranger

In October 1970, the squadron began a long relationship with USS Ranger, nicknamed "Top Gun." In the following two years, the squadron made two more combat cruises, expending over 15 million pounds of ordnance on targets in Laos and Vietnam. On 21 November 1970, squadron aircraft flew in support of Operation Ivory Coast, the attempt to free American prisoners of war from Son Tay, 20 miles (32 km) west of Hanoi. The squadron made four more deployments aboard Ranger in the 1970s.

In December 1972, the squadron participated in Operation Linebacker II, heavy air strikes against targets primarily around Hanoi and Haiphong.

On 15 January 1973, the squadron participated in a large laser-guided bombing attack against bridge targets in North Vietnam. This coordinated strike, led by VA-145, used the A-6 Intruder's Pave Knife Laser Designation System to attack 14 North Vietnamese bridges with Mark 83 and Mark 84 laser-guided bombs dropped by the A-6A and A-7E aircraft.

Following the ceasefire with North Vietnam on 27 January 1973, the squadron concentrated its attention on strikes against lines-of-communication targets in Laos until an agreement was reached with that country.

In July 1976 following the Israeli raid on Entebbe, Ranger, with VA-25 embarked, was ordered to transit from the South China Sea to the western Indian Ocean and operate off the coast of Kenya.

=== 1980s ===
VA-25 was on station in the Indian Ocean during the Iran hostage crisis.

In May 1984, the squadron began training in the F/A-18A Hornet. The squadron was redesignated as Strike Fighter Squadron 25 (VFA-25) on 1 July 1984.

Operational air wing training in multiple air-to-air and air-to-ground exercises with USS Constellation were conducted for the remainder of 1984 through January 1985. In February 1985, the squadron departed on the first deployment of the F/A-18 Hornet aboard USS Constellation to the western Pacific and Indian Ocean.

In July 1987 during the Iran–Iraq War, VFA-25 provided air cover for reflagged tankers transiting the Strait of Hormuz during Operation Earnest Will.

In June 1989, the squadron transitioned to the F/A-18C.

=== 1990s ===
When Iraq invaded Kuwait on August 2, 1990, the squadron operated from USS Independence, flying combat patrols in support of Operation Desert Shield from the Gulf of Oman for three months before being relieved by USS Midway.

In 1994, aboard USS Carl Vinson the squadron operated extensively in the Persian Gulf, flying missions over Iraq in support of Operation Southern Watch. In 1996, the squadron continued its participation in Operation Southern Watch and Operation Desert Strike. After being on station for more than three months, the squadron returned from deployment on November 12, 1996. In 1998, the squadron deployed on USS Abraham Lincoln, where it enforced United Nations no-fly zones in Iraq.

=== 2000s ===
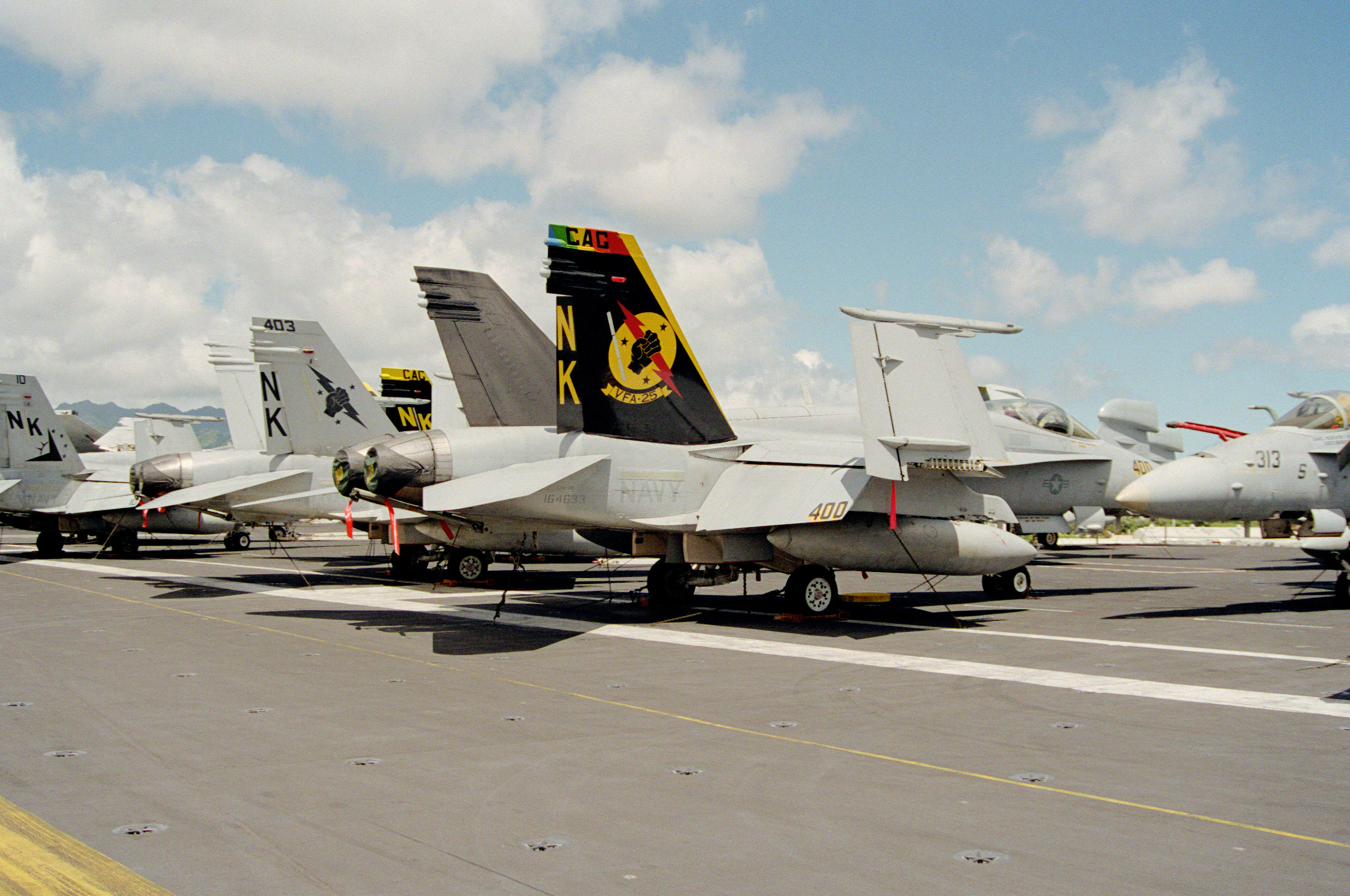
VFA-25 Hornets in 2000

In 2000, the squadron dropped several bombs on selected tactical targets in southern Iraq, and continued to patrol the skies in the Persian Gulf.

In July 2002, the squadron left NAS Lemoore for a regularly scheduled six-month deployment aboard Abraham Lincoln, seeing action over Afghanistan as part of Operation Enduring Freedom as well as over Iraq, in support of Operation Southern Watch. In late 2002, as the United States moved closer to military action against Iraq, Abraham Lincoln was ordered to stay on station in the Persian Gulf. After a total of three extensions and approaching the ship's tenth month away from home, the Iraq War began.

On 19 March 2003, the squadron began combat sorties, participating in the first-night air strikes on Baghdad. The squadron sustained an average of 20 daily combat sorties, while striking targets in Basra, An Nasiriya, Al Kut, Najaf, Al Hillah and ultimately Baghdad. The squadron’s 272 combat sorties over 18 straight days struck the Iraqi regime’s Medina, Baghdad, and Nebuchadnezzar Armored Divisions, military airfields, facilities and command and control infrastructure. VFA-25 returned to the United States in May 2003.

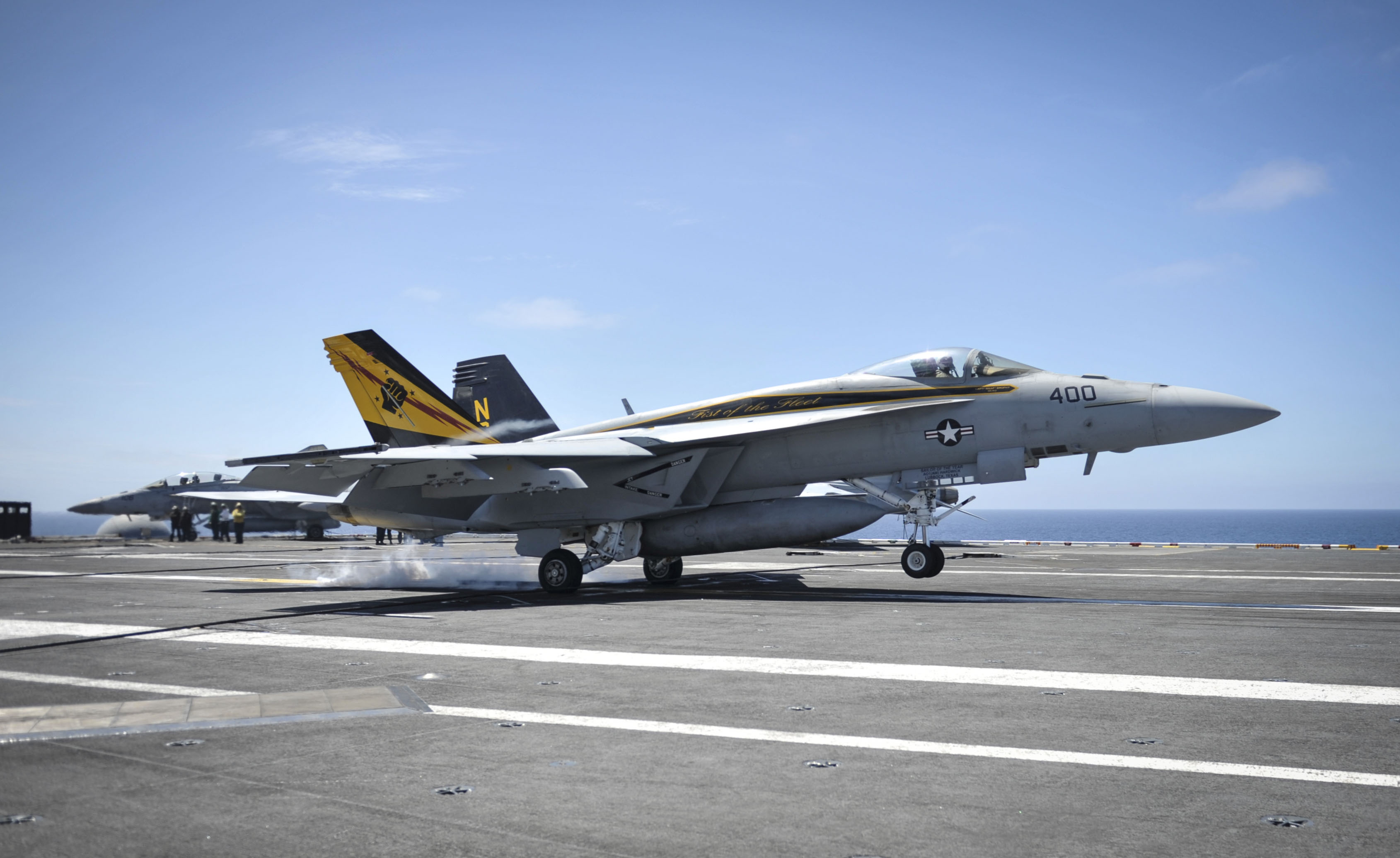
An F/A-18E of VFA-25 on USS Nimitz, September 2014.

VFA-25 deployed aboard USS John C. Stennis in May 2004 to the Western Pacific, returning 1 November 2004.

From January to July 6, 2006, VFA-25 deployed with CVW-14 in support of the Iraq War and Valiant Shield aboard USS Ronald Reagan on her maiden voyage. In January 2007, VFA-25 deployed for a 3-month "surge deployment" to the U.S. Seventh Fleet Area of Operations. VFA-25 deployed again to the WESTPAC from June to November 2008.

On May 28, 2009, VFA-25 and Carrier Air Wing 14 deployed with USS Ronald Reagan on a deployment to the 7th and 5th Fleet Areas of Responsibility.

In 2010, VFA-25 joined Carrier Air Wing Seventeen deployed aboard USS Carl Vinson sporting the "AA" tailcode leaving Carrier Air Wing Fourteen and the "NK" tailcode for the first time in decades.

Following a successful combat deployment in support of Operation Enduring Freedom in 2012, VFA-25 returned to NAS Lemoore to transition to the F/A-18E Super Hornet, completing the transition in late January 2013 and was reassigned to CVW-9.

In 2019, the Squadron deployed aboard USS Abraham Lincoln as part of Carrier Air Wing 7 for the ship's homeport change to San Diego.

In 2021, the squadron returned to a Pacific Fleet Carrier Air Wing, specifically Carrier Air Wing 11.

The squadron currently operates the Block III advanced Super Hornet as of 2026.

== In popular culture ==
VF-213 Emblem from Top Gun

A version of the squadron patch and insignia (with the altered squadron designation "VF-213" taken from the Blacklions squadron) was featured prominently in the movie Top Gun, worn by the character "Ice Man" (portrayed by Val Kilmer). In reality, VFA-25 never operated the F-14 Tomcat, instead flying the F/A-18 Hornet during that period.

A T-shirt with the Top Gun version of the insignia was worn by Antonio the busboy in the Seinfeld season 2 episode “The Busboy”.

== See also ==
- Naval aviation
- List of United States Navy aircraft squadrons
