= Air Development Squadron 51 =

Air Development Squadron 51 (VX-51)
- 第51航空隊
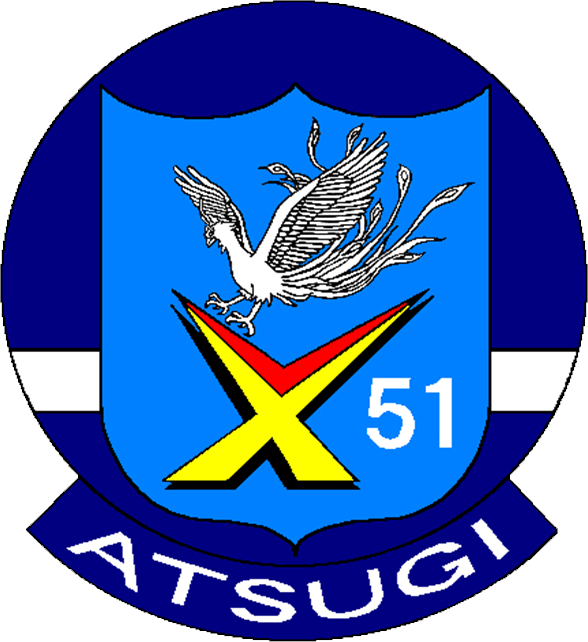
- Active: 1 September 1961
- Country: Japan
- Branch: Japan Maritime Self-Defense Force
- Part of: Fleet Air Force
- Garrison/HQ: Naval Air Facility Atsugi

Aircraft flown
- Helicopter: SH-60J/K & USH-60K
- Patrol: P-1 & UP-1, P-3C & UP-3C

Air Development Squadron 51 (第51航空隊, daigojuuichikoukuutai) (which is also referred to as Fleet Air Squadron 51 or VX-51) is a unit in the Japanese Maritime Self-Defence Force. It is a part of the Fleet Air Force and is based at Naval Air Facility Atsugi in Kanagawa prefecture.

== History ==
=== Founding and early history ===
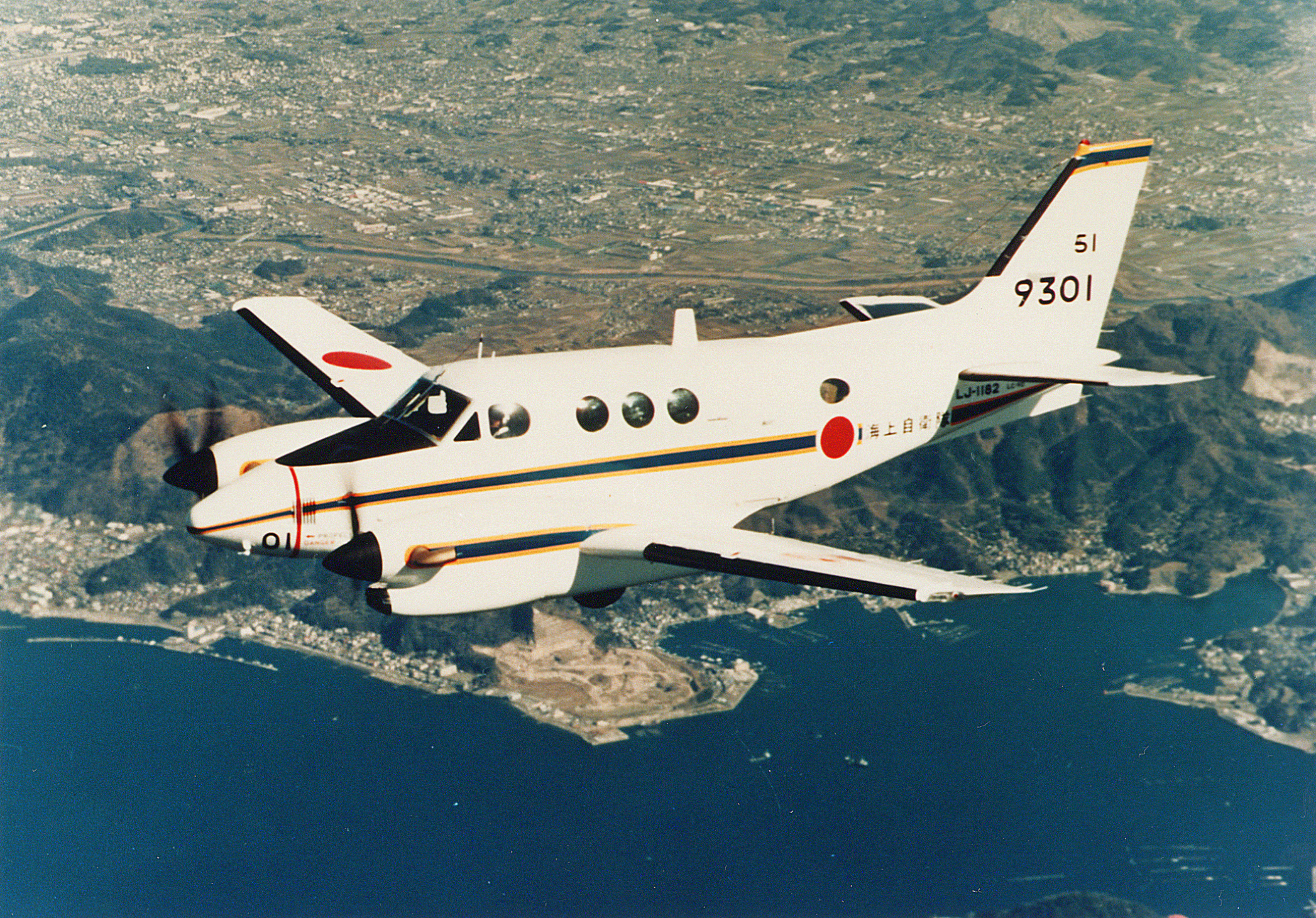
51 Sqn LC-90

In 1961 the squadron was formed at Hachinohe Air Base in Aomori Prefecture with six Lockheed P2V-7 Neptune and six Grumman S-2F Tracker aircraft as part of Fleet Air Wing 2. In 1963 it moved to Shimofusa Air Base in Chiba Prefecture and came under the authority of Fleet Air Wing 4.

In 1966 it received P-2J aircraft. In 1968 a detachment at MCAS Iwakuni in Yamaguchi Prefecture was established. In 1968 the squadron was removed from Fleet Air Wing 4's command and was placed directly under the control of the Fleet Air Force. In 1981 it moved to Atsugi Naval Air Facility in Kanagawa Prefecture

=== After move to Atsugi ===
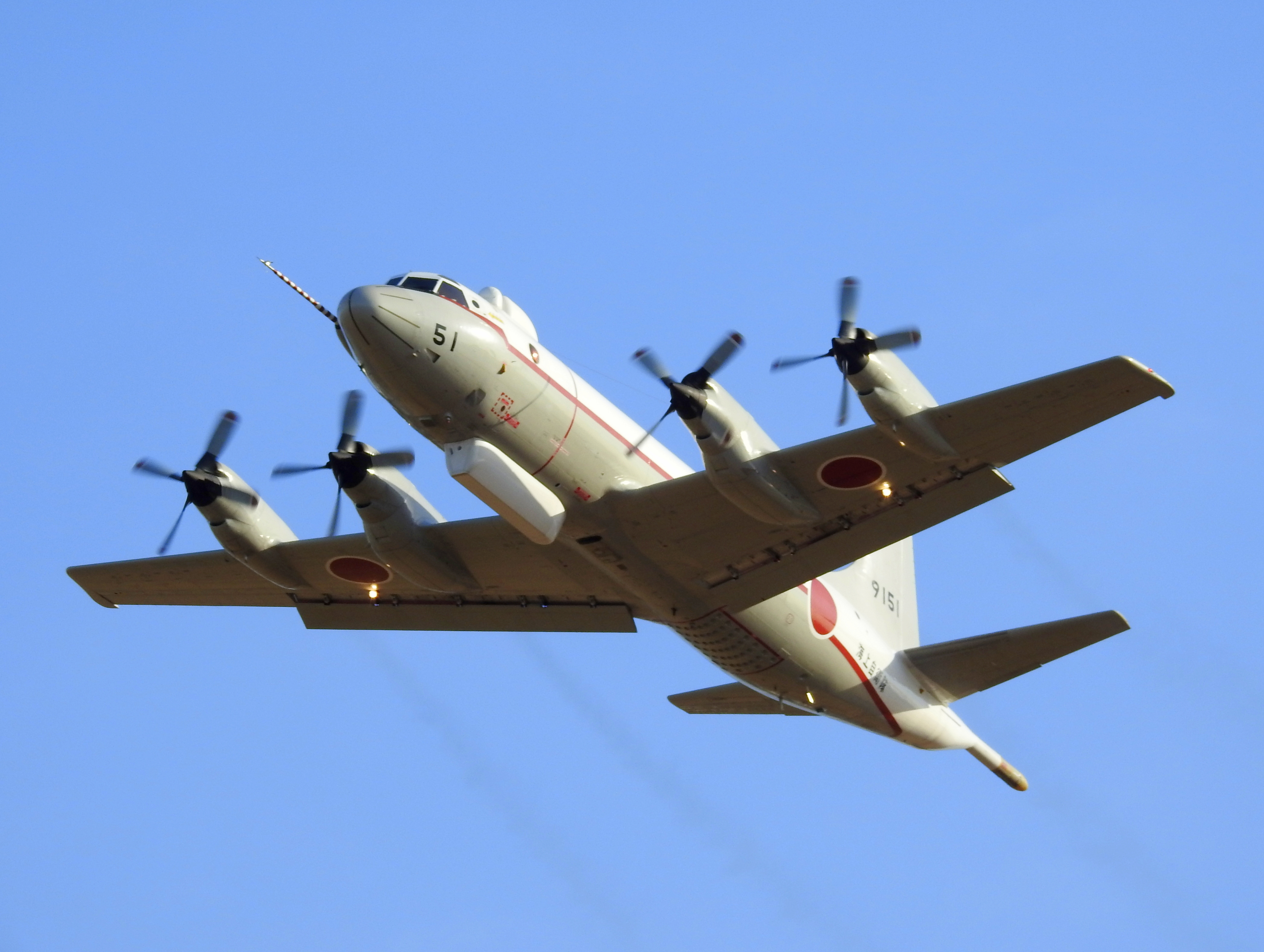
UP-3C Orion (2017)

Later in 1981 the squadron received Lockheed P-3C Orion aircraft, and in 1983 the Iwakuni detachment was disbanded. In 1989 the squadron received Sikorsky MH-53E aircraft and in 1991 it received SH-60J aircraft. In 1995 it received a UP-3C for equipment testing.

=== 21st century ===
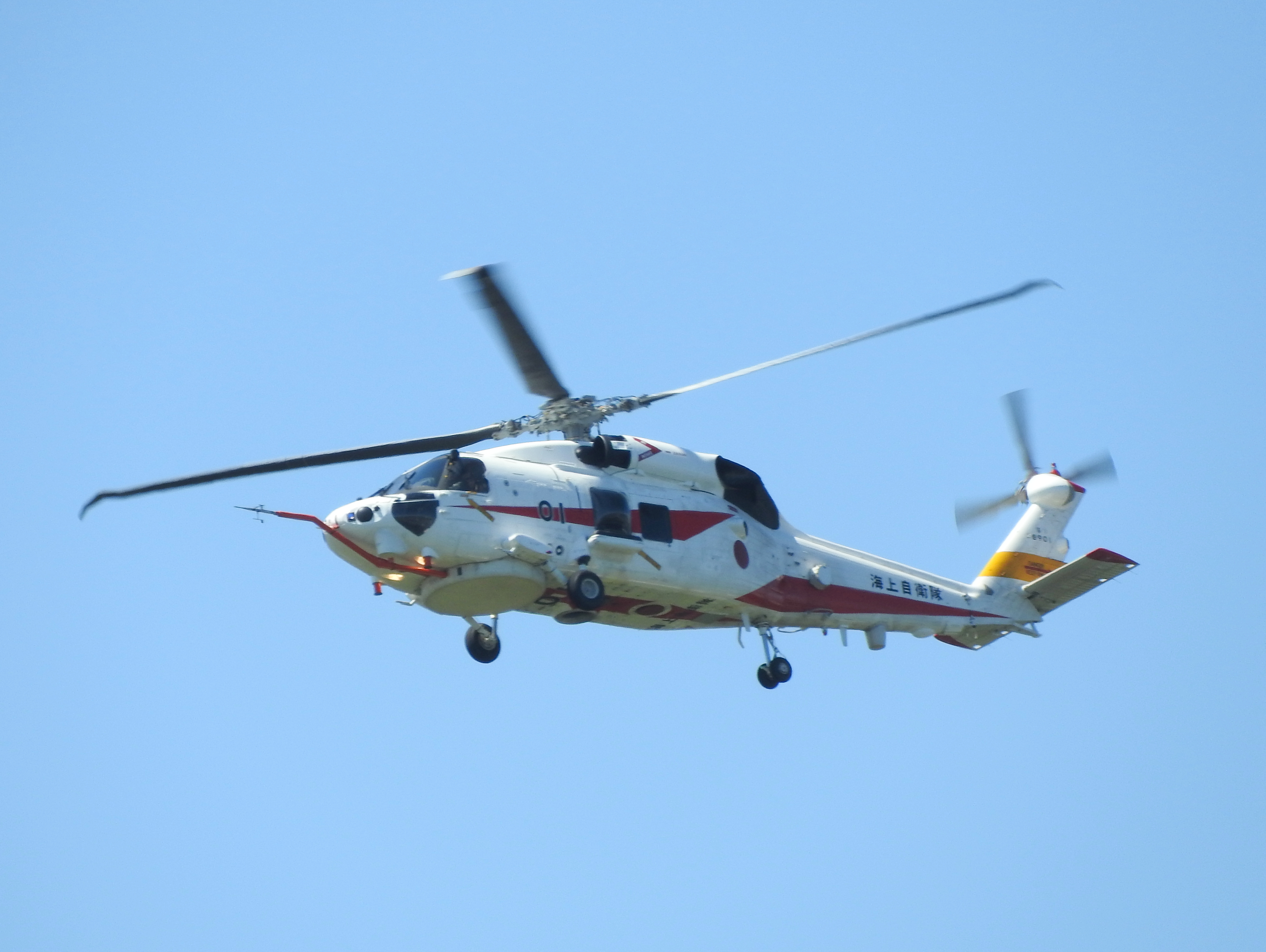
XSH-60K (USH-60K) (2016)

In 2002 it received XSH-60K (USH-60K) aircraft. In 2006 it received MCH-101 aircraft and in 2013 it received Kawasaki P-1 aircraft. In 2014 it received Lockheed C-130R Hercules aircraft.

During efforts to sell the aircraft to the UK, a pair of P-1s including one belonging to of the squadron were present for the 2015 Royal International Air Tattoo, one aircraft performing a flying display while the other was on static display; this was the first time that any Japanese military aircraft had performed in a European flight display. After their UK appearance, the P-1s proceeded to the Japan Self-Defense Force Base Djibouti at Ambouli International Airport, Djibouti, to continue with operational trials within tropical and desert climates.

== Squadron structure ==
The squadron is composed of two flights:

- 511th Flight is equipped with fixed-wing aircraft: Kawasaki P-1 & UP-1, Lockheed P-3C & UP-3C Orions
- 513th flight is equipped with helicopters: Sikorsky SH-60J/K & USH-60K Seahawks
