= Naval Air Facility Atsugi =

United States Navy air base in Greater Tokyo, Japan

NAF Atsugi
- 厚木海軍飛行場 (Atsugi Kaigun-hikōjō)
- Ayase, Kanagawa Prefecture in Japan
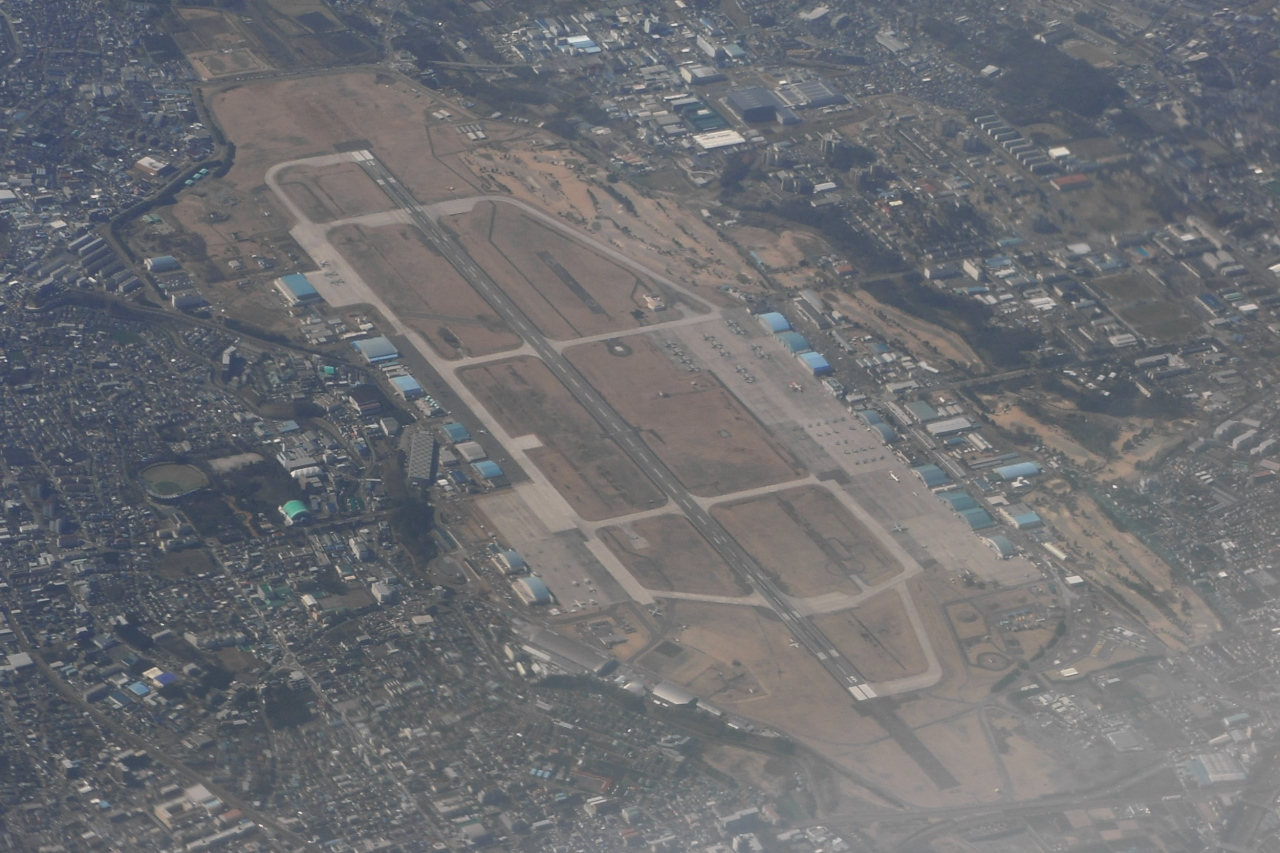
- Aerial view of NAF Atsugi during 2007

Site information
- Type: Joint Japanese and United States air base
- Owner: Government of Japan
- Operator: Japan Maritime Self-Defense Force (JMSDF); US Navy (USN)
- Controlled by: Fleet Air Force (JMSDF); Navy Region Japan (USN)
- Condition: Operational
- Website: Official website

Location
- Location in Japan
- Coordinates: 35°27′17″N 139°27′00″E

Site history
- Built: 1938
- In use: 1938 – present

Garrison information
- Current commander: Captain Manning Montagnet (USN)

Airfield information
- Identifiers: IATA: NJA, ICAO: RJTA, WMO: 476790
- Elevation: 62.4 metres (205 ft) AMSL
Runways
Direction	Length and surface
01/19	2,438 metres (7,999 ft) Concrete
- Source: Japanese AIP at AIS Japan

Naval Air Facility Atsugi (厚木海軍飛行場, Atsugi Kaigun-hikōjō) (IATA: NJA, ICAO: RJTA) is a joint Japan-US naval air base located in the cities of Yamato and Ayase in Kanagawa, Japan. It is the largest United States Navy (USN) air base in the Pacific Ocean, and once housed all of the squadrons of Carrier Air Wing Five (CVW-5), which deploys with the American aircraft carrier forward deployed to Yokosuka Naval Base.

During 2017 and 2018 the fixed-wing aircraft squadrons of CVW-5 relocated to Marine Corps Air Station Iwakuni in western Japan leaving only its two helicopter squadrons at Atsugi. In addition to the two CVW-5 helicopter squadrons NAF Atsugi is also home to Helicopter Maritime Strike Squadron 51 (HSM-51), which provides detachments of MH-60R helicopters to forward deployed U.S. Navy guided missile cruisers, guided missile destroyers, and frigates at the nearby Yokosuka Naval Base. Service members stationed at Atsugi also work in conjunction with the former Kamiseya Naval Radio Receiving Facility.

Japan Maritime Self-Defense Force (JMSDF) forces at Atsugi are the Headquarters Fleet Air Force, and Fleet Air Wing 4.

Despite its name, the base is 4 nautical miles (7.4 km; 4.6 mi) east northeast from the city of Atsugi, and is not adjacent to the city.

== History ==
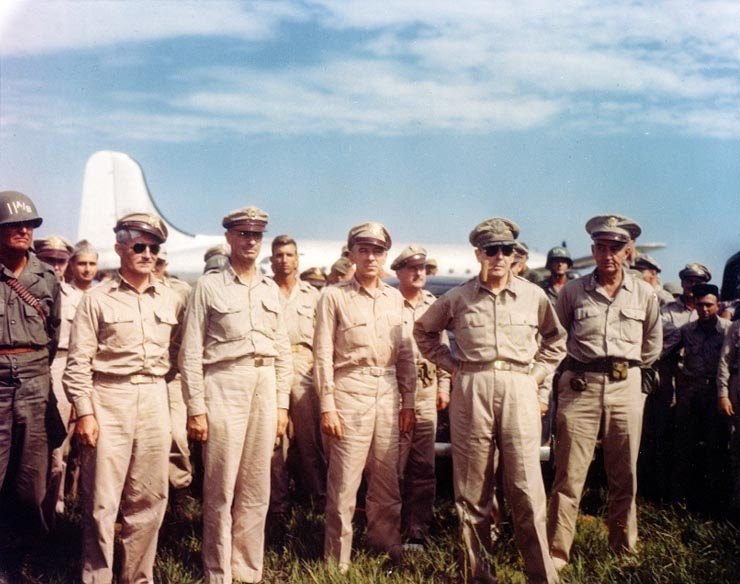
Arrival of General Douglas MacArthur (second from right) at Atsugi, 30 August 1945

The Imperial Japanese Navy constructed the base in 1938 to house the 302nd Kokutai, one of the Navy's most formidable fighter squadrons during World War II. Aircraft based at Atsugi shot down more than 300 American bombers during the firebombings of 1945. After Japan's surrender, many of Atsugi's pilots refused to follow Emperor Hirohito's order to lay down their arms, and took to the skies to drop leaflets on Tokyo and Yokohama urging locals to resist the Americans. Eventually, these pilots gave up, and left Atsugi.

The advance party of the 139th Army Airways Communication System (AACS)/769th Army Air Forces (AAF) Base Unit landed on Atsugi on 28 August 1945, to establish airfield operations and communication. Their jeep mounted control tower was the first American vehicle to land on Japanese soil. General Douglas MacArthur arrived at Atsugi on 30 August to accept Japan's surrender. Shortly afterwards, elements of the USAAF 3d Bombardment Group moved in about 8 September, being replaced by the USAAF 49th Fighter Group on 15 September which handled the initial cleanup of the heavily damaged airfield along with the 1539th Army Air Forces Base Unit to provide station facilities. Minimal flight operations were restored by October which allowed the P-61 Black Widow-equipped 418th Night Fighter Squadron to operate from the airfield to provide air defense over the area, along with the P-38 Lightnings of the 49th FG. The 49th moved to Chitose Airfield on Hokkaido in mid February 1946, the 418th NFS to Okinawa in June, and on 31 December 1946 the 1539th AAFBU moved to Haneda Airfield.

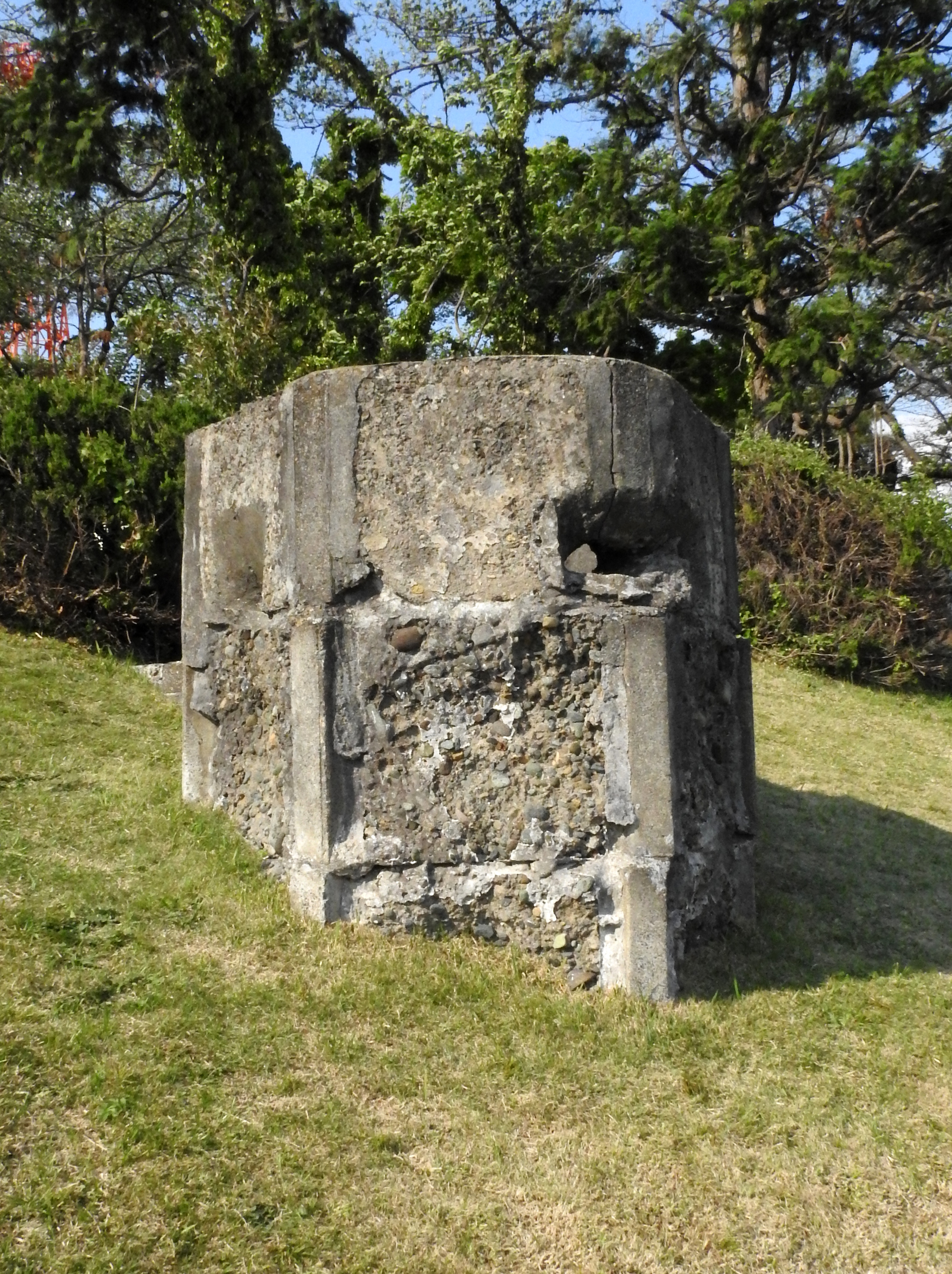
An old Atsugi guard post

During the occupation, the base housed the overflow from nearby Camp Zama; it was not refurbished to handle military air traffic until the Korean War. The Seabees (Navy construction battalions) came to the base in 1950 and prepared it for re-opening that December as Naval Air Station Atsugi.

NAF Atsugi was a major naval air base during both the Korean War and Vietnam War, serving fighters, bombers, and transport aircraft.

One of the aircraft based at Atsugi at least since 1957 was the U-2 spy plane. The plane made local Japanese headlines when it ran low on fuel and made an emergency landing at a glider-club landing strip. This same plane was piloted by Gary Powers, which provoked an international incident when it was downed over the Soviet Union.

Lee Harvey Oswald was based at Atsugi during his time in the United States Marines. He was a radar operator assigned to Marine Air Control Squadron 1. He was stationed there from September 1957 to November 1958.

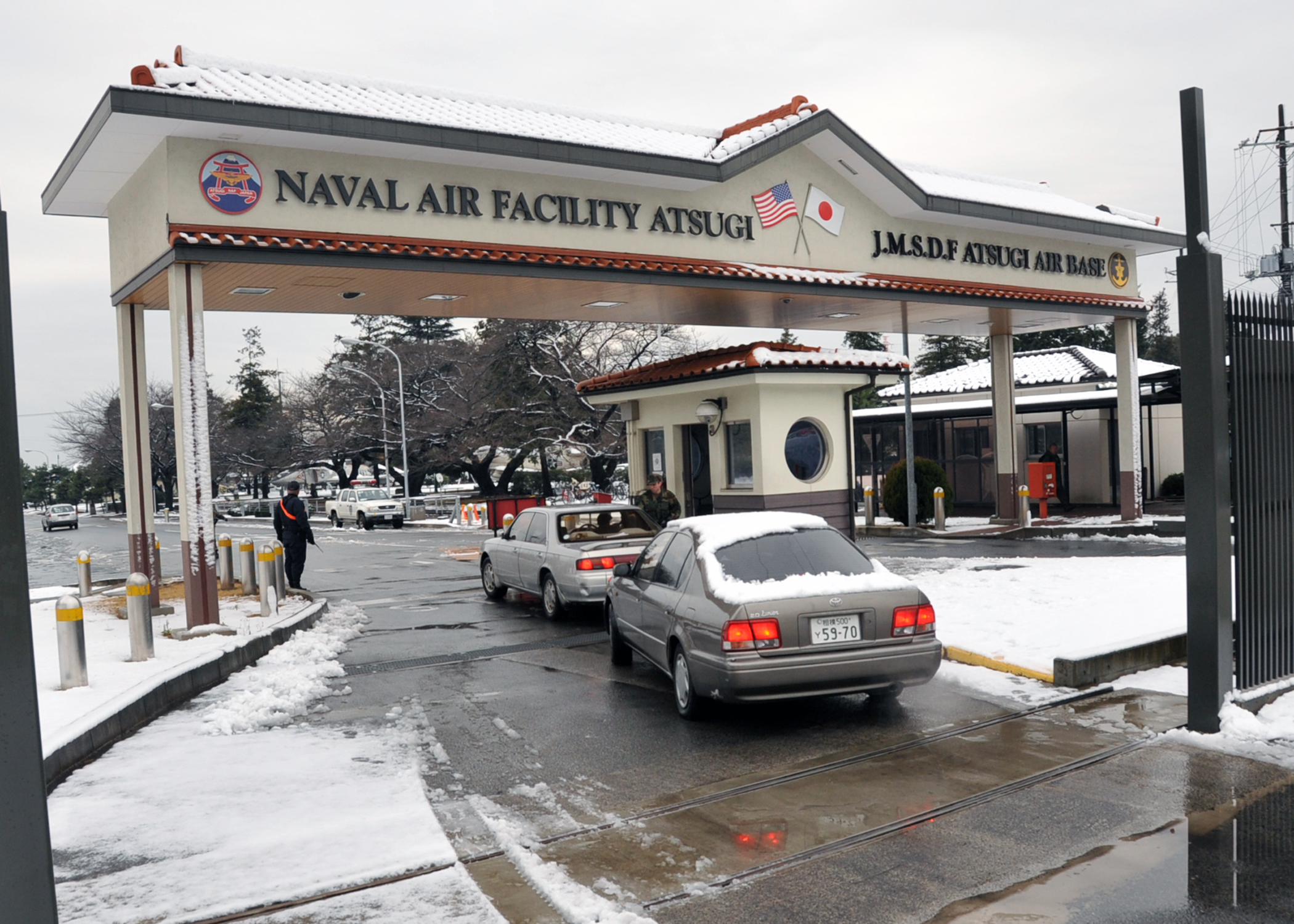
NAF Atsugi main gate

In 1964 a United States Marine Corps F8U-2 Crusader based at the airfield crashed in nearby Machida, Tokyo. The pilot ejected, and was not seriously injured, but the crash killed four, and injured 32 people on the ground, and destroyed seven houses.

In 1969 an EC-121 aircraft of VQ-1 that took off from Atsugi on a reconnaissance mission near North Korea was shot down by a North Korean MiG-21. A series of options for response were presented to Nixon but ultimately no action was taken. The reconnaissance flights resumed a week later.

In 1972, the U.S. and Japanese governments agreed to share ownership of the base, after which the Japan Maritime Self-Defense Force began operating from there.

In 1973 Yokosuka became the home port of the carrier USS Midway. As a consequence CVW-5, the carrier's air wing was based at Atsugi.

On 2 November 1976, a US Navy Grumman C-1 Trader, piloted by Lt. Laury K. Backman, suffered a mechanical failure of the aileron system while maneuvering to land on runway 01, and crashed short of the runway. All six aboard were killed.

In 1977, a McDonnell Douglas F-4 Phantom II based at the facility suffered a mechanical failure, and crashed into a residential neighborhood in nearby Yokohama. The crew ejected and survived, but two young boys, aged 1 and 3, were killed, and 7 others injured.

Elements of the Naval Security Group, and rotational squadrons of EP-3 Aries that are now stationed at Misawa Air Base were formerly stationed at Atsugi until the 1990s.

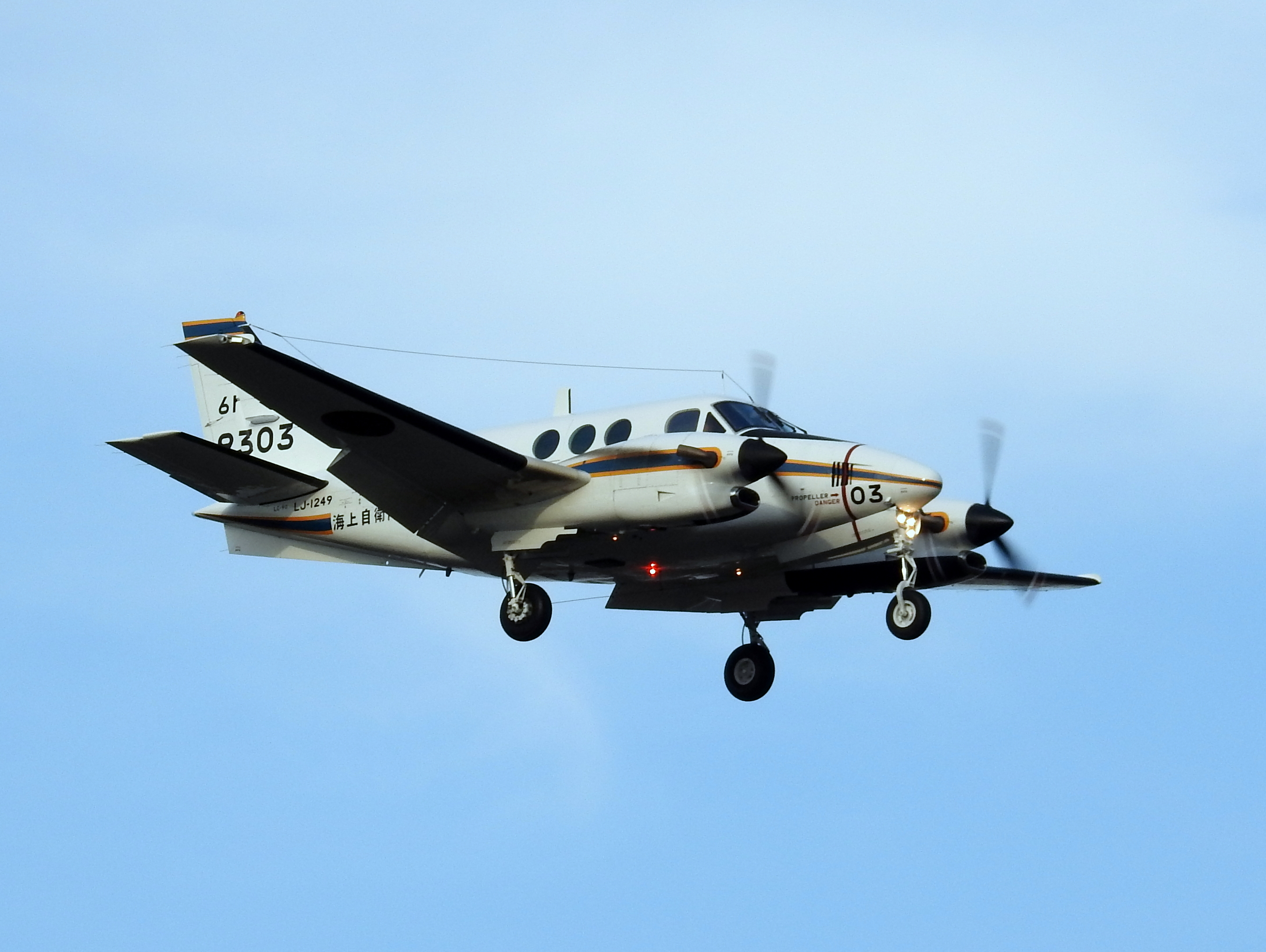
JMSDF LC-90 landing

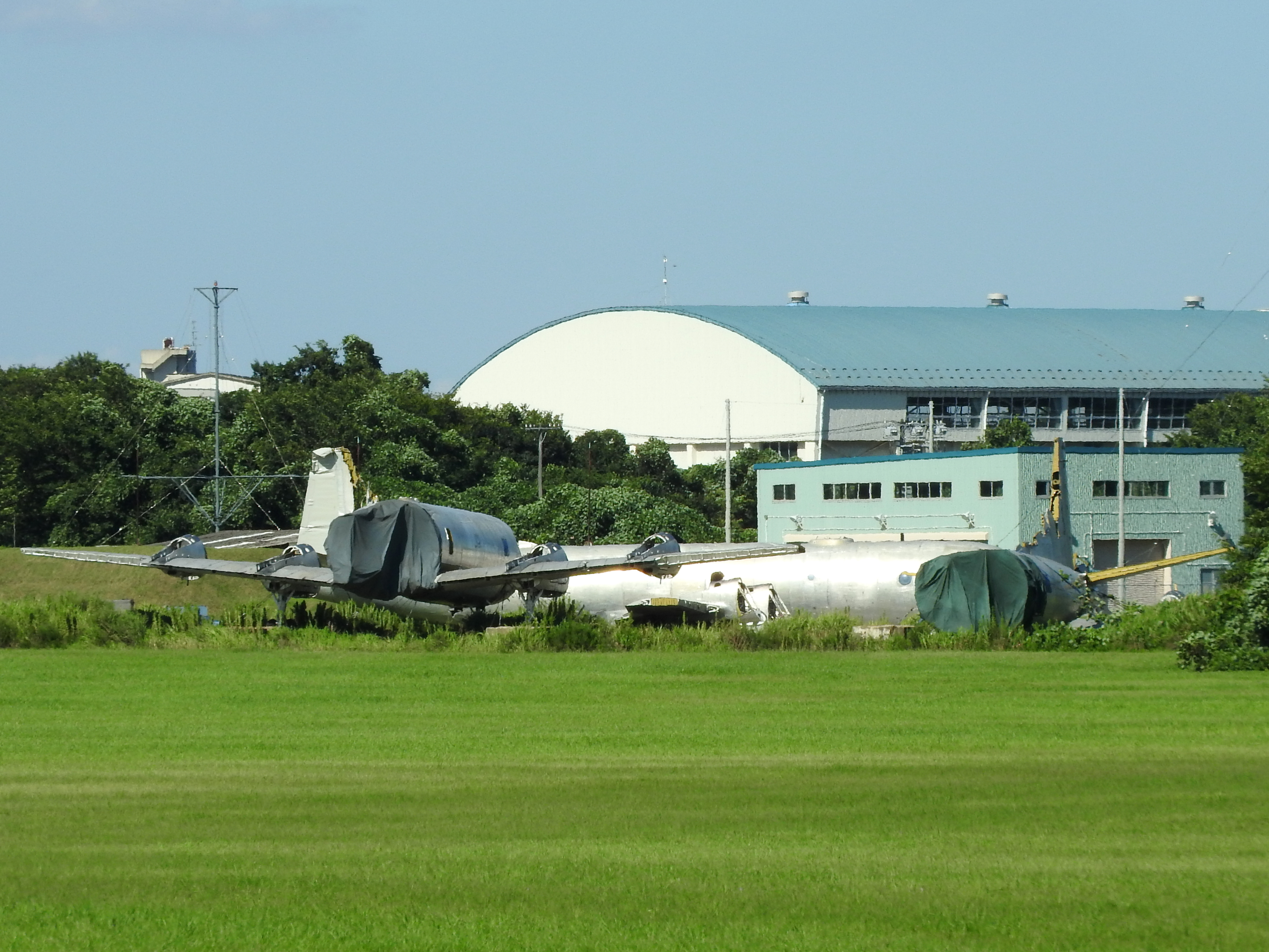
Scrapped P-3 Orions at Atsugi in 2016

On 9 February 1999 a fire broke out at a terminal, no injuries were reported.

On 3 April 2003 a faction of the leftist group Kakurōkyō attacked the facility with improvised mortar fire. Around the same time the same group also attacked Yokota Air Base, and the National Defence Agency.

In 2004 a McDonnell Douglas MD 900 Explorer operated by Aero Asahi made a crash-landing at Naval Air Facility Atsugi. There were no fatalities.

On 14 November 2009 a fire in Hangar 183 at the base injured three Japanese employees of Obayashi Corporation. The fire was reported at 11:55 a.m., and was extinguished by 12:45 p.m. The hangar was moderately damaged.

In December 2009, Atsugi was again attacked, this time by Kakurōkyō members via improvised mortar barrages.

Personnel and aircraft from the base assisted with Operation Tomodachi following and during the March 2011 Tōhoku earthquake and tsunami and Fukushima I nuclear accidents. During the crisis, around 2,000 American family members voluntarily departed the base for locations outside Japan.

On 16 December 2013 a MH-60S Knighthawk of CVW-5 crashed in Miura city due to a tail jam. The aircraft was written off, and two of the four occupants were injured.

On 15 February 2014 three US Navy P-3 Orions were crushed "beyond repair" when their hangar was destroyed due to a massive snow storm.

In December 2016 police arrested a Kawasaki man for pointing a laser pointer at JMSDF aircraft in July of the same year. It was reported that in 2016 there had been about 30 reports of laser pointers being directed at Japanese, and US aircraft.

A Grumman C-2A Greyhound assigned to VRC-30 aboard the USS Ronald Reagan was lost in an accident at sea on 22 November 2017. Three of the personnel on board were lost. After this a detachment of 4-6 US Marine Corps Bell Boeing V-22 Osprey tilt-rotor aircraft were deployed to Atsugi for a week to fly supplies to the USS Ronald Reagan.

== Base name ==
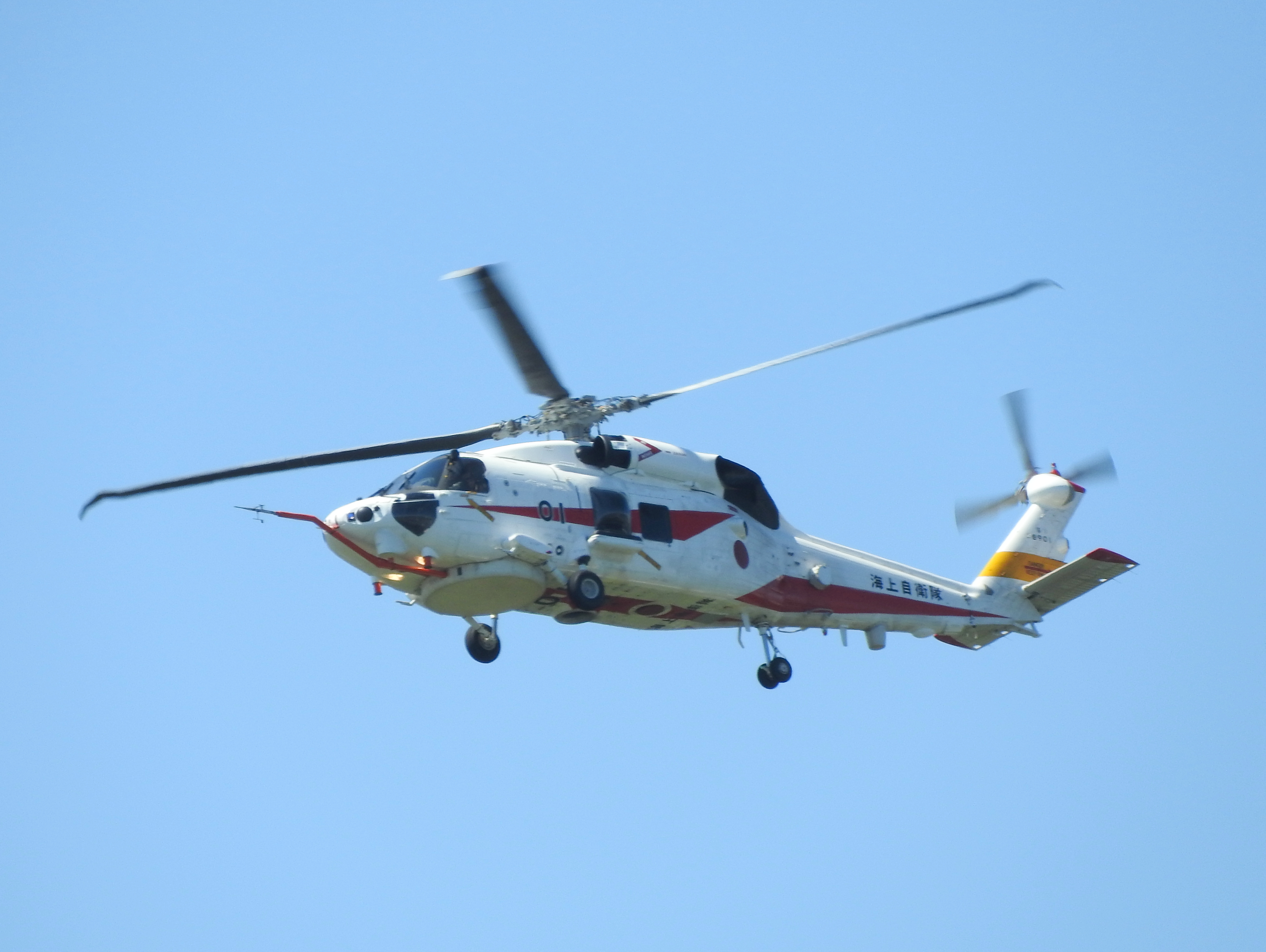
JMSDF USH-60K #8901 of Air Development Squadron 51

Atsugi is named after the nearby city of Atsugi despite not actually being in Atsugi (it is separated from Atsugi by two other cities).

The name was chosen because Atsugi was the only large town in the area as of 1950, and the three farming villages surrounding the base at that time—Yamato Village, Ayase Village, and Shibuya Village—shared names with better-known areas elsewhere in Japan. Yamato is an alternative name for the Nara region, Ayase is generally associated with the area around Ayase Station in northeast Tokyo, and Shibuya is generally associated with the ward of Shibuya in central Tokyo.

== Base issues ==
=== The Jinkanpo Incinerator ===
NAF Atsugi and the people stationed there gained notoriety in the 1990s (stemming from near-daily reports in the Pacific Stars and Stripes newspaper) due to their proximity to the Jinkanpo Atsugi Incinerator, which blew toxic, and cancerous emissions over the high-rise buildings in its immediate vicinity. The incinerator's owners, arrested and jailed for charges of tax evasion, neglected the maintenance of the facility. The pollution had become so much of a health problem for residents that if they showed signs of adverse health effects, the base allowed them to leave early (usually servicemembers are stationed at the base for a tour of three years). Many servicemembers reported sickness, and a few died from cancer shortly after moving back to the United States. For a time, the base required servicemembers to undergo medical screenings before being stationed at the base in order to ensure that their bodies could handle the poor air quality. In spite of this, servicemembers still developed health problems, such as acute cases of asthma.

The US government's Department of Justice sued the incinerator operators. In May 2001, just before the court was to hand down its decision, the Japanese government purchased the plant for nearly 40 million dollars and shut it down. Dismantling was completed by the end of that year.

=== Noise lawsuits ===
Since 1976 there have been a number of lawsuits with local residents sued the Japanese government over noise from the base, and in October 2002 the Yokohama district court ruled that the government should pay 2.75 billion yen in compensation. Both the plaintiffs, and the government appealed the case and in July 2006 the Tokyo High Court ordered the government to pay 4.04 billion yen to 4,865 people living near the base.

The fourth lawsuit over noise was filed in 2007 in the Yokohama District Court. In May 2014 the court ruled that the SDF should not operate its aircraft between 10pm to 6am and that the government should pay ¥7 billion yen in damages. It was the first lawsuit to request the grounding of US military aircraft. This request was rejected by the court.

The ruling was appealed, and in its July 2015 ruling the Tokyo High Court gave ¥9.4 billion to around 6,900 residents from eight cities, increasing the payout from the ¥7 billion yen ordered by the Yokohama district court. The Tokyo court also rejected calls to forbid night flights by US aircraft, arguing that the Japan-US security treaty is beyond the government's jurisdiction. In this it was following a Supreme Court ruling on the 1976 case, where the court ruled that the Japanese government has no power to regulate the activities of US forces in the country.

The case was appealed to the Supreme Court and in December 2016 Japan's Supreme Court overturned the ban on SDF night flights. It upheld the damages awarded by the Tokyo High Court. The plaintiffs planned to file a fifth lawsuit as soon as February 2017.

Organizing by residents continued and in July 2017 it was reported that there were plans for around 6,000 local people to launch the fifth lawsuit against the government regarding noise from the base. Shuji Onami, leader of the plaintiffs, stated "Our lives are disrupted and are even put at risk whenever we are hit with booming noise (from aircraft) overhead. We will never accept the reality of the Atsugi base-related flights." It was also reported that 2,000 to 3,000 additional residents may also join the action at a later time.

As of August 2017 6,063 nearby residents had joined the lawsuit.

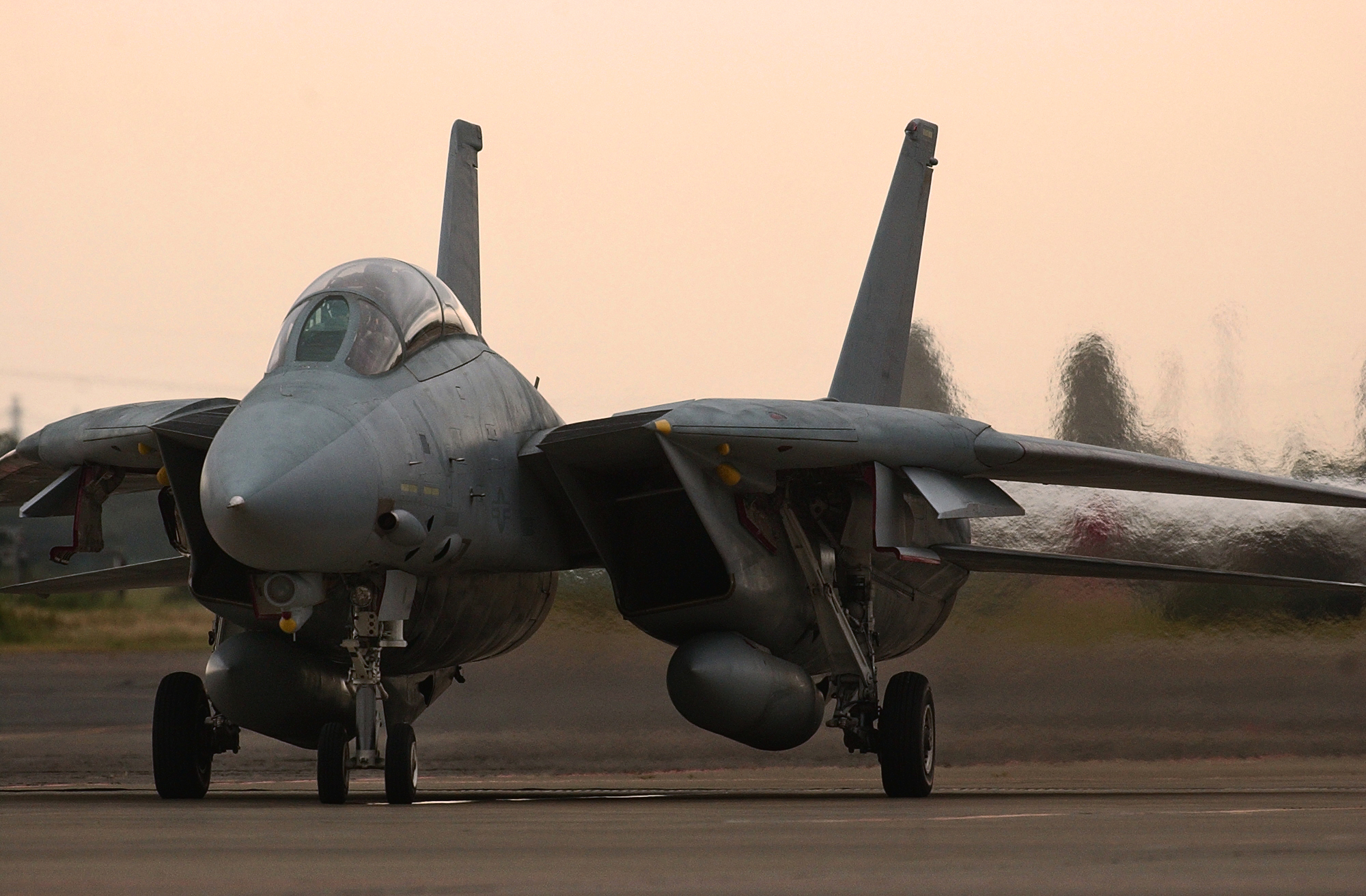
An F-14 Tomcat assigned to the "Black Knights" of Fighter Squadron VF-154 departs Naval Air Facility Atsugi on 24 September 2003.

== Protests and complaints ==
In addition to the lawsuits over noise there have been a number of protests regarding the base. In July 1988 20,000 people made a human chain around the base to protest about noisy night landings at the base.

In 2005 Yamato city officials protested over noisy night landings from F/A-18 Hornet training.

In 2007 the Japanese Communist Party (JCP) protested about F-16 and F/A-18 exercises at the base, and asked that they be stopped.

In 2013 the JCP also protested after a USN MH-60S Seahawk helicopter from Atsugi crashed in Miura city, and asked that Bell Boeing V-22 Ospreys not be deployed to Atsugi. When Ospreys were sent to the base for training this also caused local protests.

There were complaints in 2017 after children were allowed to touch machine guns on US helicopters during the May 2017 open day at Atsugi. City authorities from Ayase and Yamato cities complained, after which the machine guns were quickly removed.

== Friendship festival ==
During Spring Atsugi holds an open day. Non-Japanese visitors may be turned away from the gates for security reasons. Prospective attendees who are neither Japanese or American should bring identification and also consult the Third Country National list to see if they require special approval to enter the base.

There was an "Atsugi WINGS" air show held until the year 2000, featuring the "diamond of diamonds" display by formations of US Navy aircraft. This was last held in the year 2000. There were many complaints about aircraft noise and low-flying planes, and from 2001 onwards full-fledged flying displays were not held during the open day. Currently there is a ground display of US Navy and JMSDF aircraft, as well as take-offs and landings by various aircraft, including touch-and-go landing practice.

== Carrier Air Wing Five ==
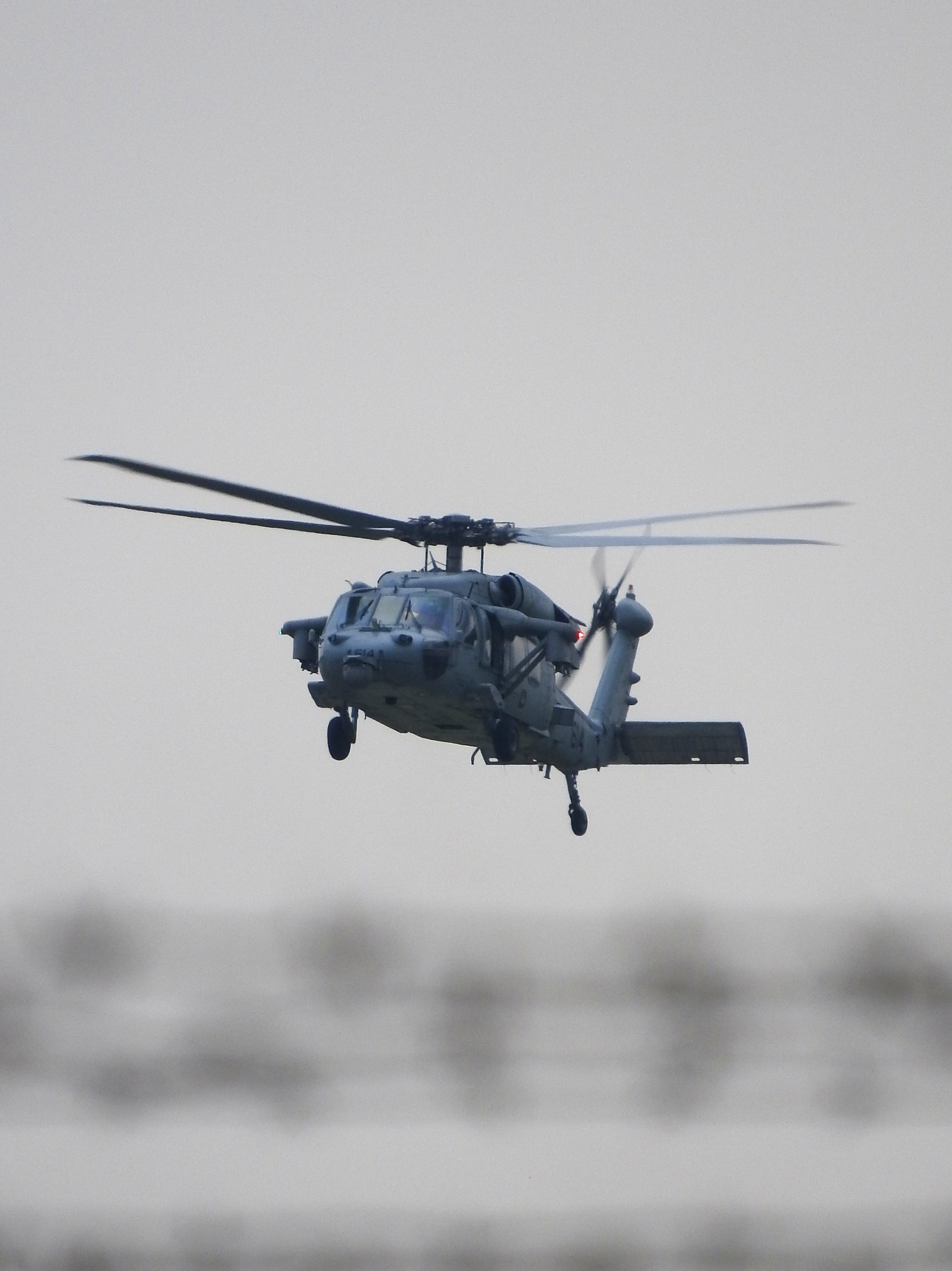
A US Navy MH-60S Seahawk training flight

Atsugi hosts the two helicopter squadrons of Carrier Air Wing Five. The wing includes about 70 aircraft and 1,500 military personnel, but the wing staff and all of its fixed wing squadrons are located at Marine Corps Air Station Iwakuni when the carrier is in port leaving only about 16 helicopters and 300 to 400 military personnel stationed at Atsugi when the carrier is in port at Yokosuka. On 9 May 2008 the wing commander, Captain Michael P. McNellis, was relieved of command by Rear Admiral Richard B. Wren, commander of Commander Task Force 70, after the admiral said he lost confidence in McNellis' ability to command. McNellis was replaced by Captain Michael S. White. In 2012 the squadrons of CVW 5 completed their transition to variants of the Super Hornet/Growler, making it the first air wing without legacy Hornets.

=== Relocation to Iwakuni ===
Until 2018 all the squadrons of Carrier Air Wing Five were forward deployed to NAF Atsugi. Since at least 2005 there had been plans to relocate the approximately 60 fixed wing aircraft of the wing from Atsugi to Marine Corps Air Station Iwakuni in Yamaguchi prefecture. Yamaguchi governor Sekinari Nii said there was "no way" Yamaguchi prefecture would accept this. In 2006 Iwakuni voters rejected the plan in a plebiscite and Iwakuni mayor Katsusuke Ihara urged Tokyo to drop the plan. In 2007 the Japanese government passed legislation to prepare for the relocation of US Forces in Japan including subsidies for local affected areas.

The move was planned to have been done in 2014, but after construction delays the move was delayed by three years, to 2017.

The plan was for the move to take place in stages and be completed in May 2018. The move did not include the wing's approximately 20 helicopters.

The move began in August 2017 with the five E-2D Hawkeye aircraft of VAW-125 relocating to Iwakuni after the USS Ronald Reagan's summer 2017 patrol. Around 3800 personnel were expected to move to Iwakuni.

By 28 November three more squadrons relocated after the Ronald Reagan's second patrol of 2017. The new squadrons were the F/A-18E Super Hornet-equipped VFA-115 and VFA-195 and the EA-18G Growler-equipped VAQ-141. Fleet Logistics Support Squadron VRC-30 also relocated to MCASI by December 2017.

In March 2018 strike fighter squadrons VFA-27 with the F/A-18E Super Hornet and VFA-102 with the F/A-18F Super Hornet arrived at MCAS Iwakuni, completing the move of CVW-5's fixed-wing aircraft squadrons.

== Tenant squadrons ==
=== Maritime Self-Defense Force ===
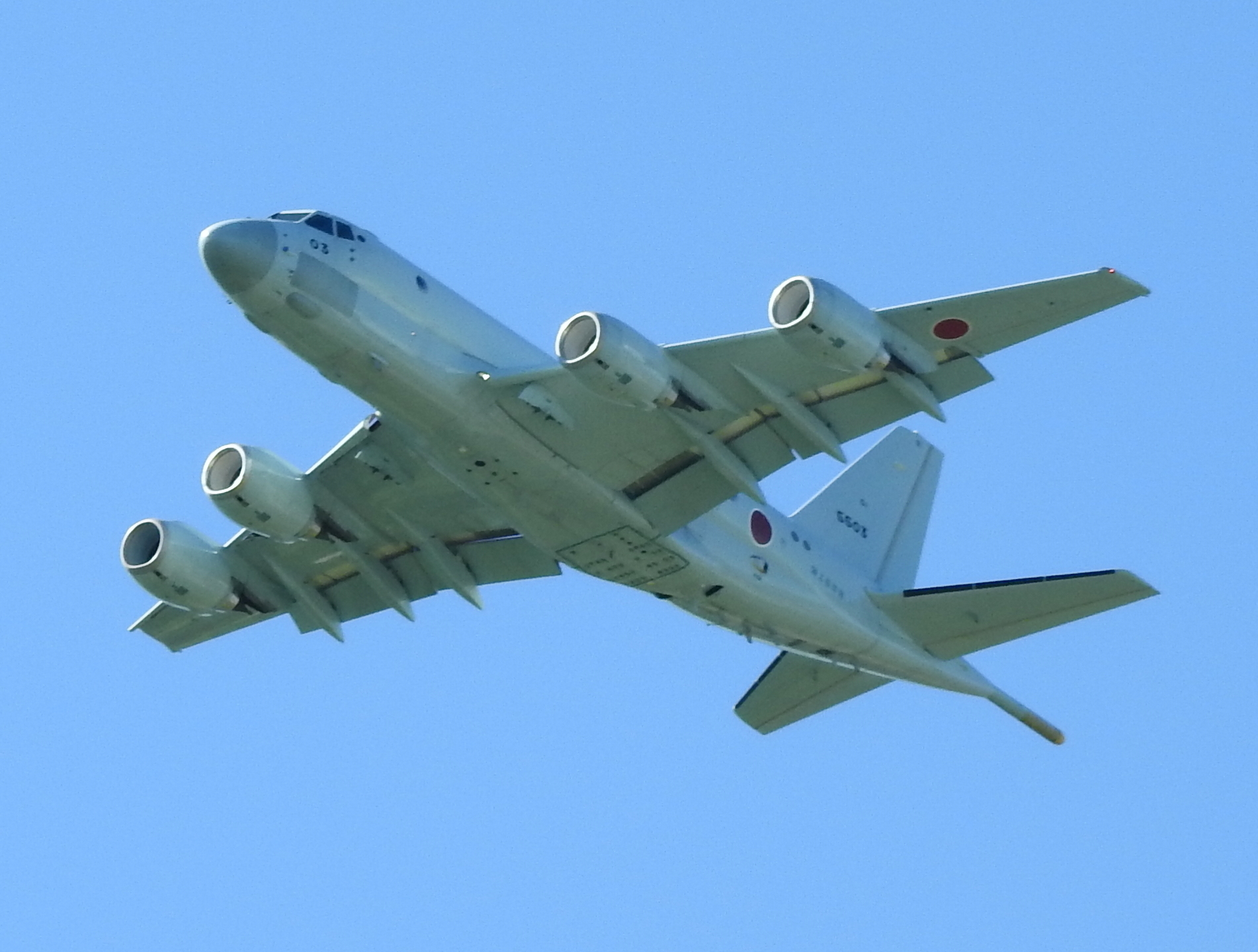
JMSDF P-1 patrol aircraft taking off from NAF Atsugi

As of 2018, the following Fleet Air Force units of the Japan Maritime Self-Defense Force units are based at NAF Atsugi:

- Fleet Air Wing 4, Air Patrol Squadron 3 (Lockheed P-3C Orion) (Kawasaki P-1)
- Air Transport Squadron 61 (Lockheed C-130R Hercules) (LC-90)
- Air Development Squadron 51 (P-1 & UP-1, P-3C & UP-3C Orion, SH-60J/K & USH-60K Seahawk)

=== US Navy ===
As of 2018, the US Navy tenant commands at NAF Atsugi are:

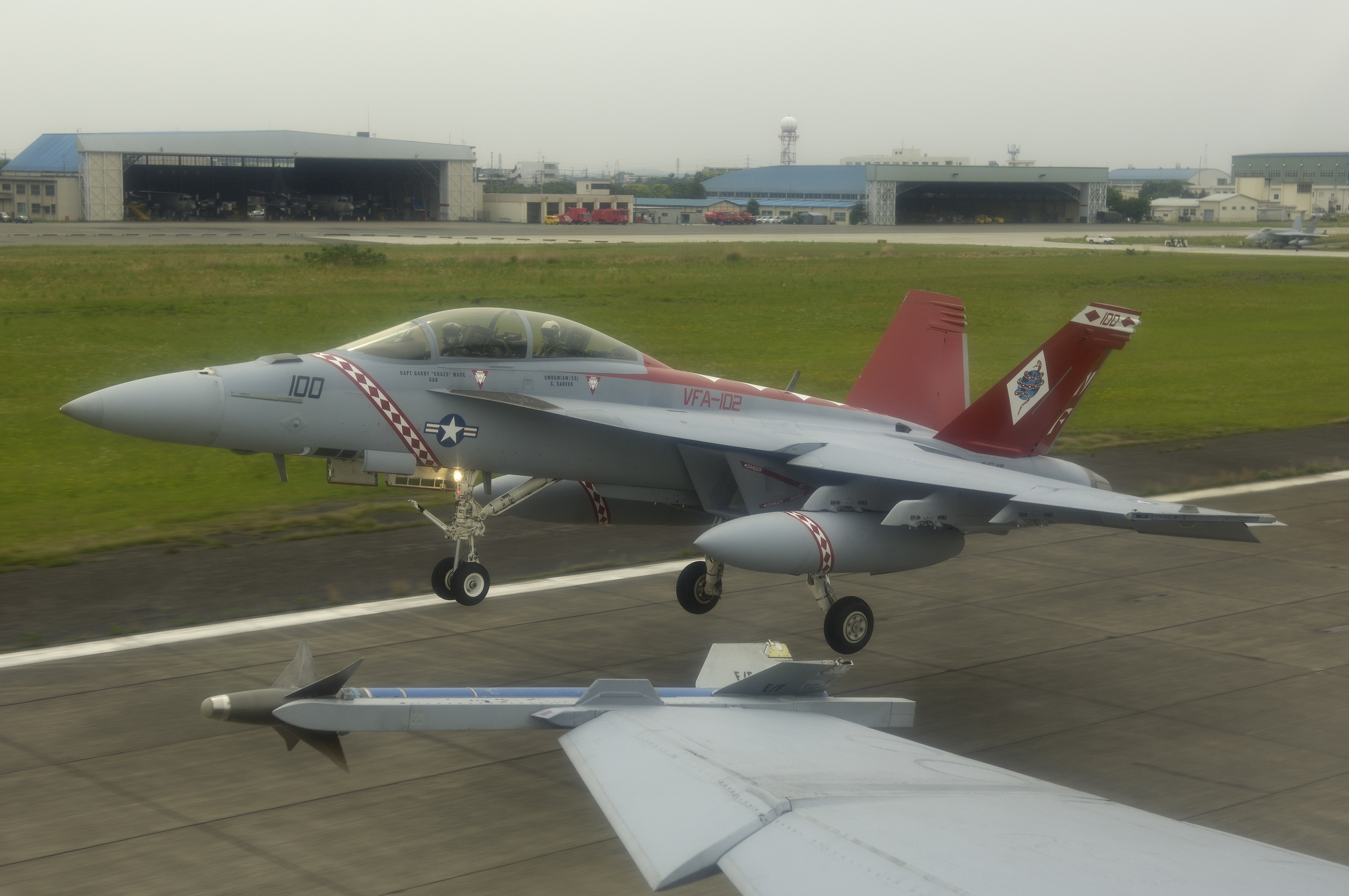
Two Super Hornets from VFA-102 at NAF Atusgi

- Helicopter Maritime Strike Squadron 51 Warlords (Sikorsky MH-60R "Seahawk")
- CVW-5 Helicopter squadrons: (The fixed-wing squadrons and the carrier air wing staff are based at Marine Corps Air Station Iwakuni)
  - Helicopter Maritime Strike Squadron 77 Saberhawks (MH-60R Seahawk)
  - Helicopter Sea Combat Squadron 12 Golden Falcons (MH-60S Seahawk)
- Fleet Readiness Center Western Pacific
- Fleet Logistics Support Wing Clipper (C-40)

== See also ==
- Izumi no Mori, a nature park operated by the city of Yamato, is located near the base.
