= Fleet Air Wing 4 (JMSDF) =

- 第3航空隊
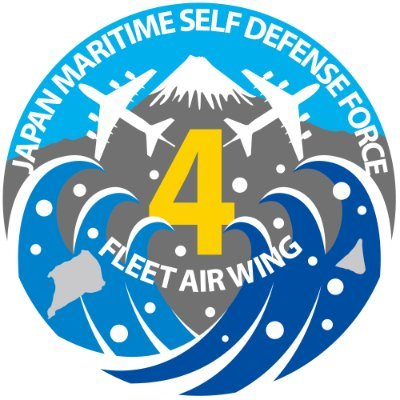
- Country: Japan
- Branch: Japan Maritime Self-Defense Force
- Part of: Fleet Air Force

Fleet Air Wing 4 (第4航空群, daiyonkoukuugun) is a unit of the Fleet Air Force of the Japan Maritime Self-Defense Force. It is based at Naval Air Facility Atsugi in Kanagawa Prefecture. It consists of Air Patrol Squadron 3, the Atsugi Base Squadron and the Iwo Jima Base Squadron (With a detachment on Minami-Tori-shima (Marcus Is.).
