= Air Transport Squadron 61 (JMSDF) =

- 第61航空隊
- Active: 20 December 1971
- Country: Japan
- Branch: Japan Maritime Self-Defense Force
- Part of: Fleet Air Force
- Garrison/HQ: Naval Air Facility Atsugi

Aircraft flown
- Transport: LC-90, C-130R

Air Transport Squadron 61 (第61航空隊, dairokujuuichikoukuutai) (also referred to as VC-61 or Fleet Air Squadron 61) is a unit in the Japanese Maritime Self-Defence Force. It is a part of the Fleet Air Force and is based at Naval Air Facility Atsugi in Kanagawa prefecture. It operates LC-90 and Lockheed C-130R Hercules aircraft.

== History ==
The squadron was founded at Atsugi Naval Air Facility on December 20, 1971 equipped with NAMC YS-11 aircraft. In 1989 it began to operate the LC-90, and in November 2014 the unit began to operate five former Lockheed Martin KC-130R tanker aircraft of the US Marine Corps. They were stripped of their refueling equipment and redesigned as C-130R aircraft. In December 2014 the squadron's YS-11s were retired. The former US C-130s came into service from 2014 to 2016.

In the past the squadron has also operated Grumman S-2F-U Tracker, Douglas C-27 Skytrain RFD-6 and Beechcraft B65 Queen Air aircraft.

== Aircraft used ==
- Douglas C-27 Skytrain RFD-6
- Grumman S-2F-U Tracker
- Beechcraft B65 Queen Air
- YS-11M/M-A (1971-2014)
- LC-90 (1989-)
- Lockheed C-130R (2014-)

== Gallery ==
Aircraft

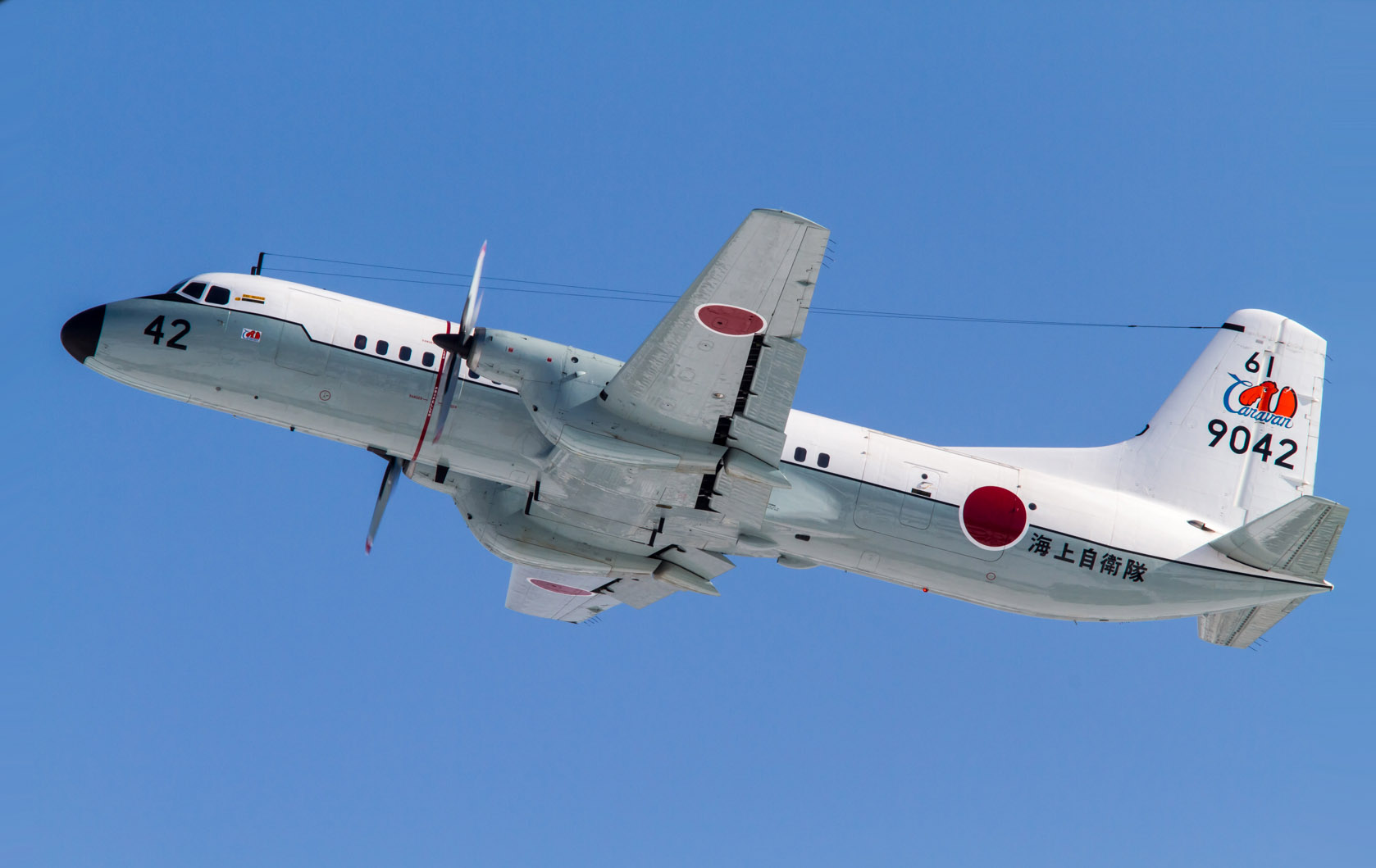
YS-11M taking off from Atsugi (2013)

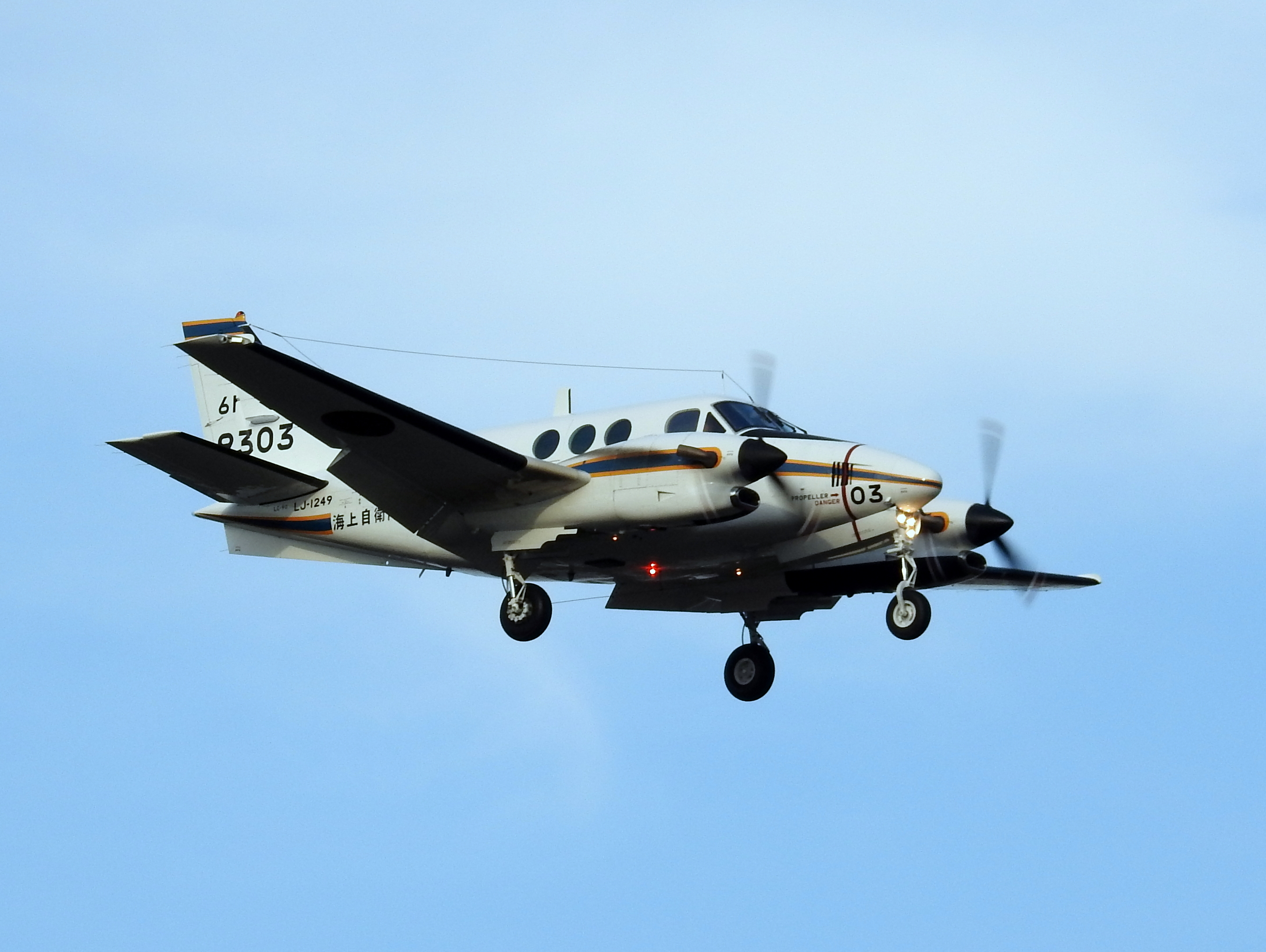
LC-90 landing at Atsugi (2017)

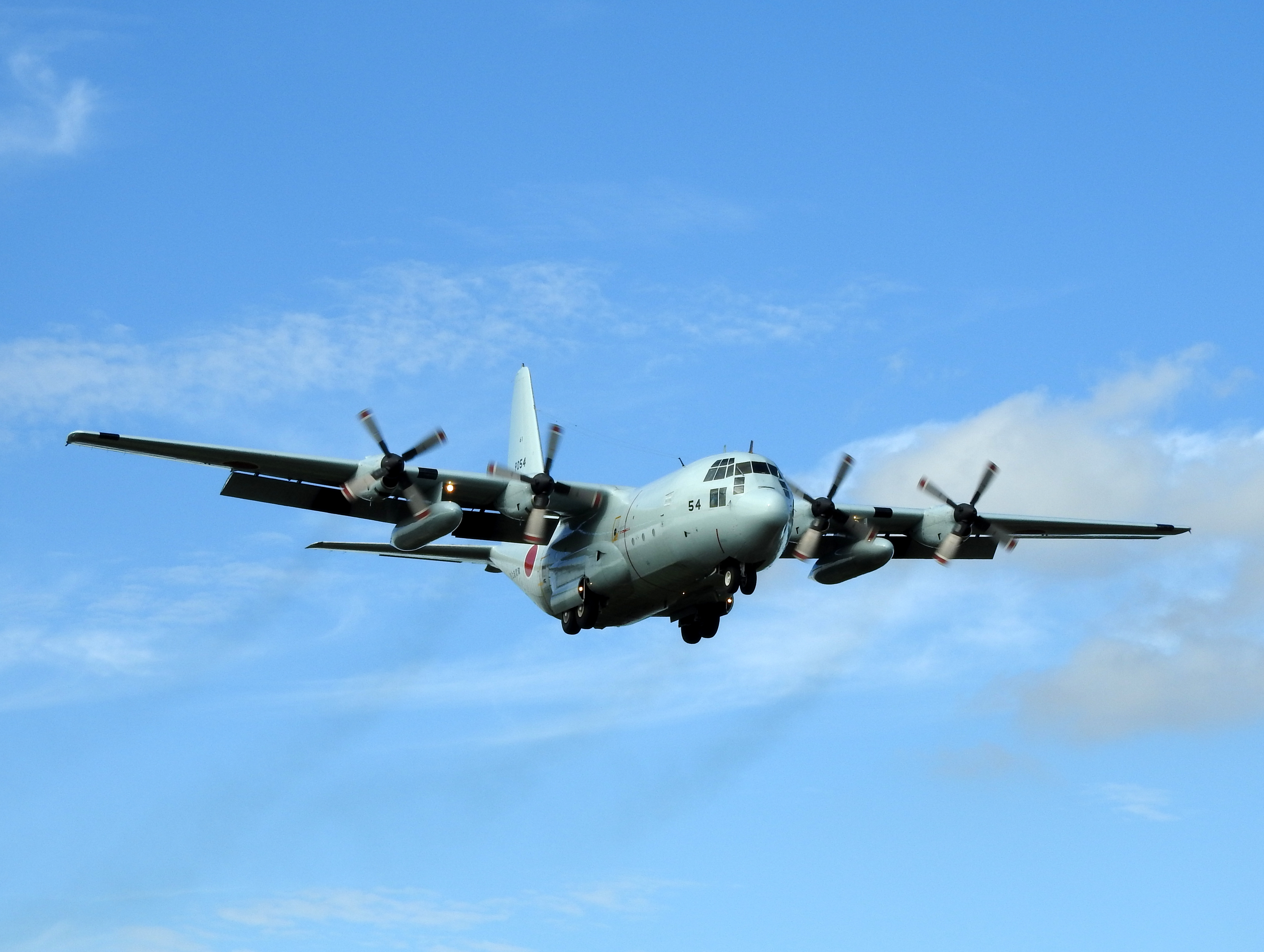
Lockheed C-130R landing at Atsugi (2016)
