= Air Patrol Squadron 3 (JMSDF) =

- 第3航空隊
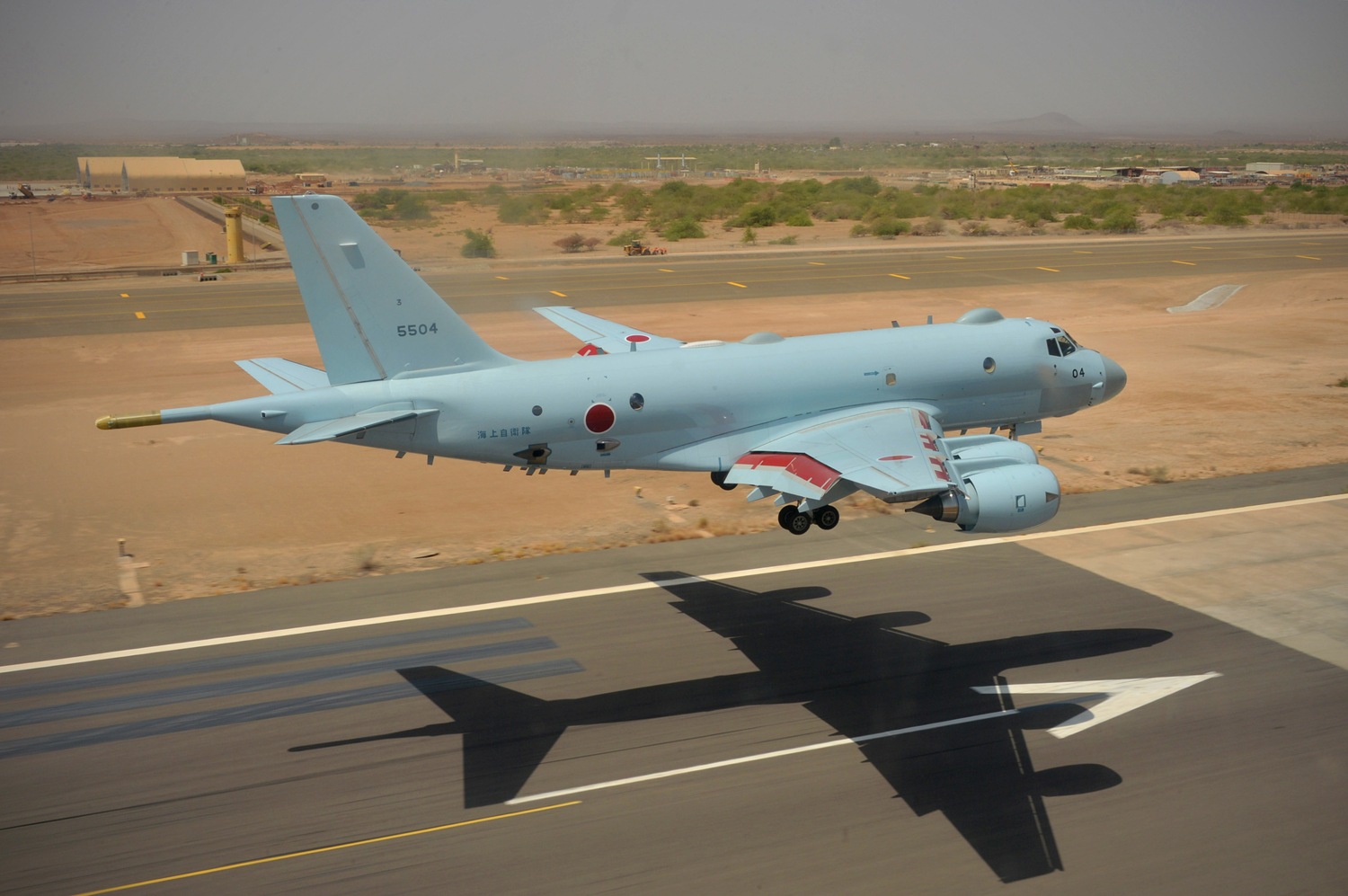
- Squadron 3 Kawasaki P-1
- Active: 1 September 1961
- Country: Japan
- Branch: Japan Maritime Self-Defense Force
- Part of: Fleet Air Wing 4
- Garrison/HQ: Naval Air Facility Atsugi
- Nickname: Sea Eagle

Aircraft flown
- Patrol: P-1

Air Patrol Squadron 3 (第3航空隊, daisankoukuutai) (also referred to as VP-3 or Fleet Air Squadron 4) is a unit in the Japan Maritime Self-Defence Force. It is a part of Fleet Air Wing 4 and is based at Naval Air Facility Atsugi in Kanagawa prefecture. It is equipped with Kawasaki P-1 aircraft.

== History ==
=== Founding and early history ===
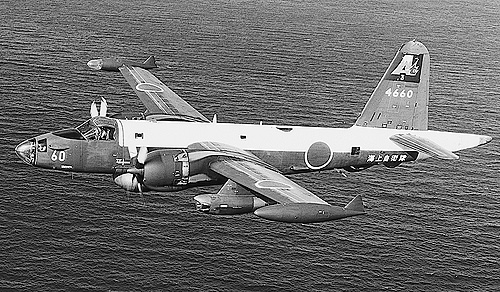
3 Sqn P2V-7

The squadron was founded on September 1, 1961, at Kanoya Air Base in Kagoshima Prefecture with the founding of the Fleet Air Force on the same date. It was equipped with nine Lockheed P2V-7 Neptune aircraft. It moved to Shimofusa Air Base in Chiba Prefecture on September 1, 1962. In 1971 part of Naval Air Facility Atsugi was returned to Japanese control by the US Navy. The squadron moved to Atsugi on December 25, 1973.

=== At Atsugi ===
In 1974 the squadron began to receive P-2J aircraft. In 1984 they started to be replaced by Lockheed P-3C Orion aircraft, with the P-2Js being retired in January 1985.

The squadron has taken part in the Hawaii-based international RIMPAC exercises.

On March 16, 2008, it merged with Air Patrol Squadron 6, which had also been based at Atsugi.

In April 2014 two P-3Cs from Atsugi deployed to RAAF Base Pearce near Perth in Western Australia to participate in the international search for the missing Malaysia Airlines Flight 370 to replace two P-3Cs from Air Patrol Squadron 5 that had deployed in March.

From March 2015 the squadron started to re-equip with Kawasaki P-1 patrol aircraft. This was completed on August 29, 2017. It was the first operational squadron to convert to the P-1.

In November 2016 two P-1s were sent to New Zealand for the 75th Anniversary of the Royal New Zealand Navy. While they were in the country the 2016 Kaikōura earthquake occurred. The aircraft conducted a number of damage assessment flights of the affected areas.

== Squadron structure ==
The squadron is composed of two flights:

- 31st flight is equipped with the P-1
- 32nd flight is equipped with the P-1. Until 2017 it was equipped with the P-3C.

== Aircraft used ==
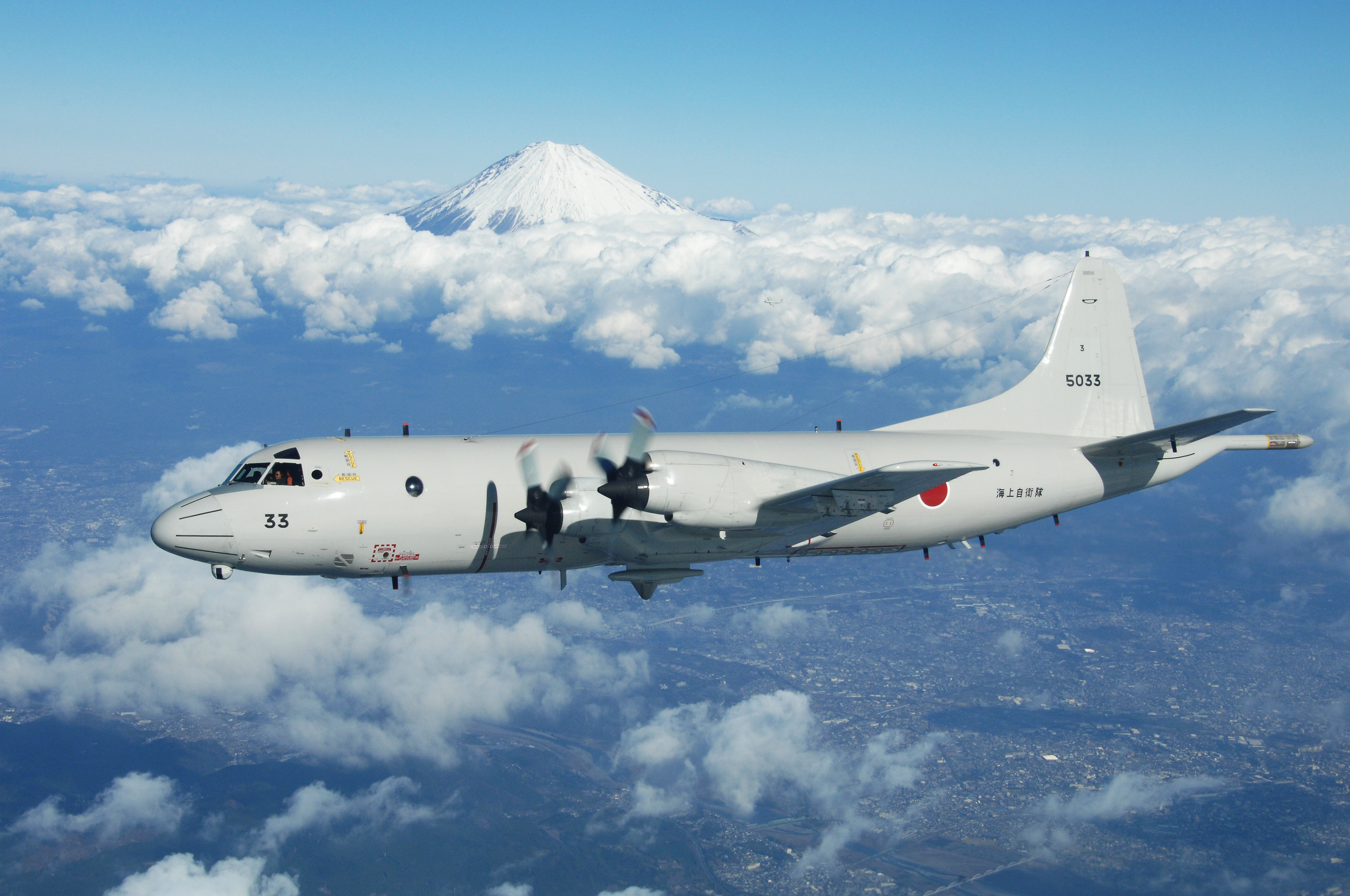
3 Sqn Lockheed P-3 Orion

- Lockheed P2V-7 Neptune (1961–1977)
- Lockheed P-2J (1974–1985)
- Lockheed P-3C Orion (1984–2017)
- Kawasaki P-1 (2015–present)
