= HSM-51 =

U.S. helicopter squadron

Helicopter Maritime Strike Squadron FIVE ONE
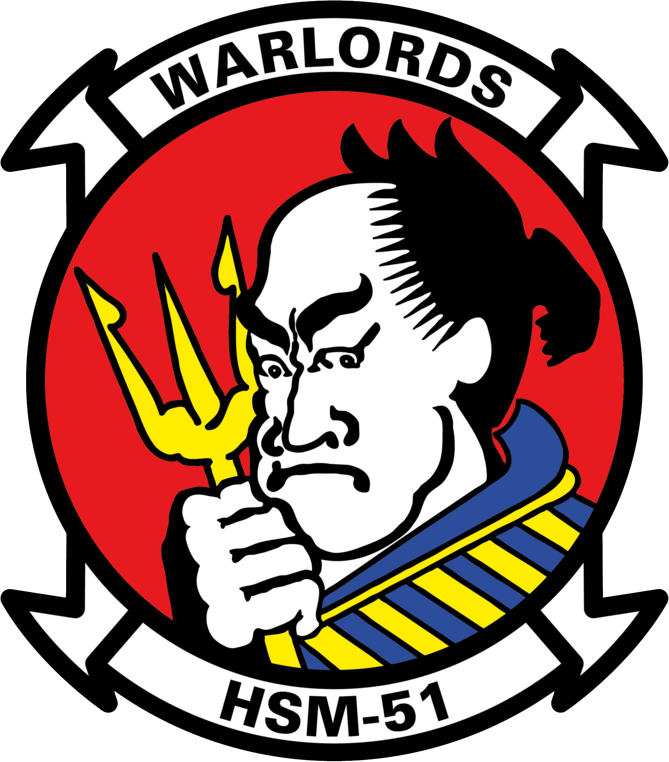
- HSM-51 squadron emblem
- Active: 1991 - present
- Country: United States of America
- Branch: United States Navy
- Type: Naval Helicopter Squadron
- Role: Anti-submarine warfare (ASW); Anti-surface warfare (ASUW); Search and rescue (SAR); Executive transport (For SEVENTH Fleet)
- Part of: Commander, Helicopter Maritime Strike Wing, Pacific Fleet
- Garrison/HQ: Naval Air Facility Atsugi
- Nickname: "Warlords"
- Colors: Red and Black
- Engagements: Operation Desert Storm; Operation Enduring Freedom; Operation Iraqi Freedom

Helicopter Maritime Strike Squadron Five One (HSM-51), also known as "Warlords," is a United States Navy helicopter squadron stationed at Naval Air Facility Atsugi, located in Ayase City, Kanagawa Prefecture, Honshu, Japan. HSM-51 is part of the Helicopter Maritime Strike Wing, Pacific Fleet, which consists of seven squadrons based in San Diego. The squadron regularly deploys on various ships within the U.S. Navy's Seventh Fleet, primarily stationed in Yokosuka, Japan.

== History ==
HSL-51 was established on October 3, 1991, and underwent a transition to become HSM-51 on March 7, 2013.

=== 2001 ===
All eight detachments of the HSL-51 Warlords deployed in response to the terrorist attacks on September 11th. While the majority of Carrier Airwing Five remained in Atsugi, the Warlords deployed in support of the Global War on Terror (GWOT) and Operation Noble Eagle to the Persian Gulf, the Strait of Malacca, and the Micronesia Subregion.

=== 2011 ===
5 detachments were deployed in response to the a 9.0-magnitude earthquake and subsequent tsunami that struck northeastern Japan on March 11, 2011. They operated both independently and as part of the George Washington Strike Group, providing direct support for Operation Tomodachi. The entire squadron relocated from NAF Atsugi to NAF Misawa with less than 18 hours' notice. Throughout the relief efforts, they flew 118 sorties, accumulating 382 hours of flight time and delivering over 100 tons of critical supplies.

=== The meaning of Musashi ===
The Warlords squadron draws inspiration from the samurai warrior depicted on their unit insignia, Miyamoto Musashi, reflecting their commitment to the principles associated with him. Miyamoto Musashi was a renowned figure in the 16th century, excelling in various disciplines such as warfare, art, sculpture, and calligraphy. As a master swordsman, he developed and refined a technique called niten'ichi ("two heavens as one"), which involved the simultaneous use of a large sword (katana) and a "companion sword" (wakazashi). Musashi's expertise extended beyond swordsmanship to include proficiency in throwing weapons. His combat style emphasized a straightforward approach devoid of unnecessary embellishments or aesthetic considerations. The approval process for the symbol and patch was conducted in conjunction with the Japanese government.

== Leadership ==
The commanding officer of HSM-51 is Commander Rachel Tarbox. The executive officer is Commander Matthew Petersen. The command master chief is Command Master Chief Paul James who holds the designations of Aviation Warfare Specialist (AW), Surface Warfare Specialist (SW), and Information Warfare Specialist (IW).

== Mission ==
HSM-51, known as the "Warlords," is a forward-deployed helicopter squadron of the U.S. Navy. They operate the Sikorsky MH-60R "Seahawk" helicopters and are based at Naval Air Facility Atsugi, Japan. The squadron provides armed anti-surface and anti-submarine helicopter detachments to ships deployed in the Korean, Western Pacific, and Persian Gulf regions. They also support executive transport for the Commander, U.S. Seventh Fleet, in Yokosuka, Japan. The HSM-51 recently transitioned from the SH-60B to the MH-60R, which offers improved capabilities.

The MH-60R is equipped with a range of sensors, including low-frequency sonar, air-launched sonobuoys, surface search radar, an electronic support measures (ESM) system, and a forward-looking infrared (FLIR) turret. It carries various weapons such as torpedoes (Mk 46, Mk 50, or Mk 54), Hellfire missiles (AGM-114), and a machine gun (M240 7.62 mm or GAU-21 0.50 in) mounted on the cabin door.

HSM-51 is recognized as an elite squadron within the HSM community and is often referred to as the "varsity squad." Their primary missions include anti-submarine warfare (ASW) and anti-surface warfare (ASUW). They also engage in secondary missions like search and rescue (SAR), medical evacuation (MEDEVAC), vertical replenishment (VERTREP), special operations support (SPECOPS), naval surface fire support (NSFS), communications relay (COMREL), and logistics support.

== Squadron aircraft ==
The UH-3H Sea King helicopter was in service from 1991 to 2006, with a specific configuration for VIP purposes. Similarly, the SH-60 Seahawk helicopter was utilized from 1991 to 2013. The SH-60B variant was employed during this period, and from 2005 to 2013, a VIP-configured SH-60F model was also utilized. Since 2013, the MH-60R variant has been in service.

== See also ==
- History of the United States Navy
- List of United States Navy aircraft squadrons
