= Mine Countermeasures Helicopter Squadron 111 (JMSDF) =

- 第111航空隊
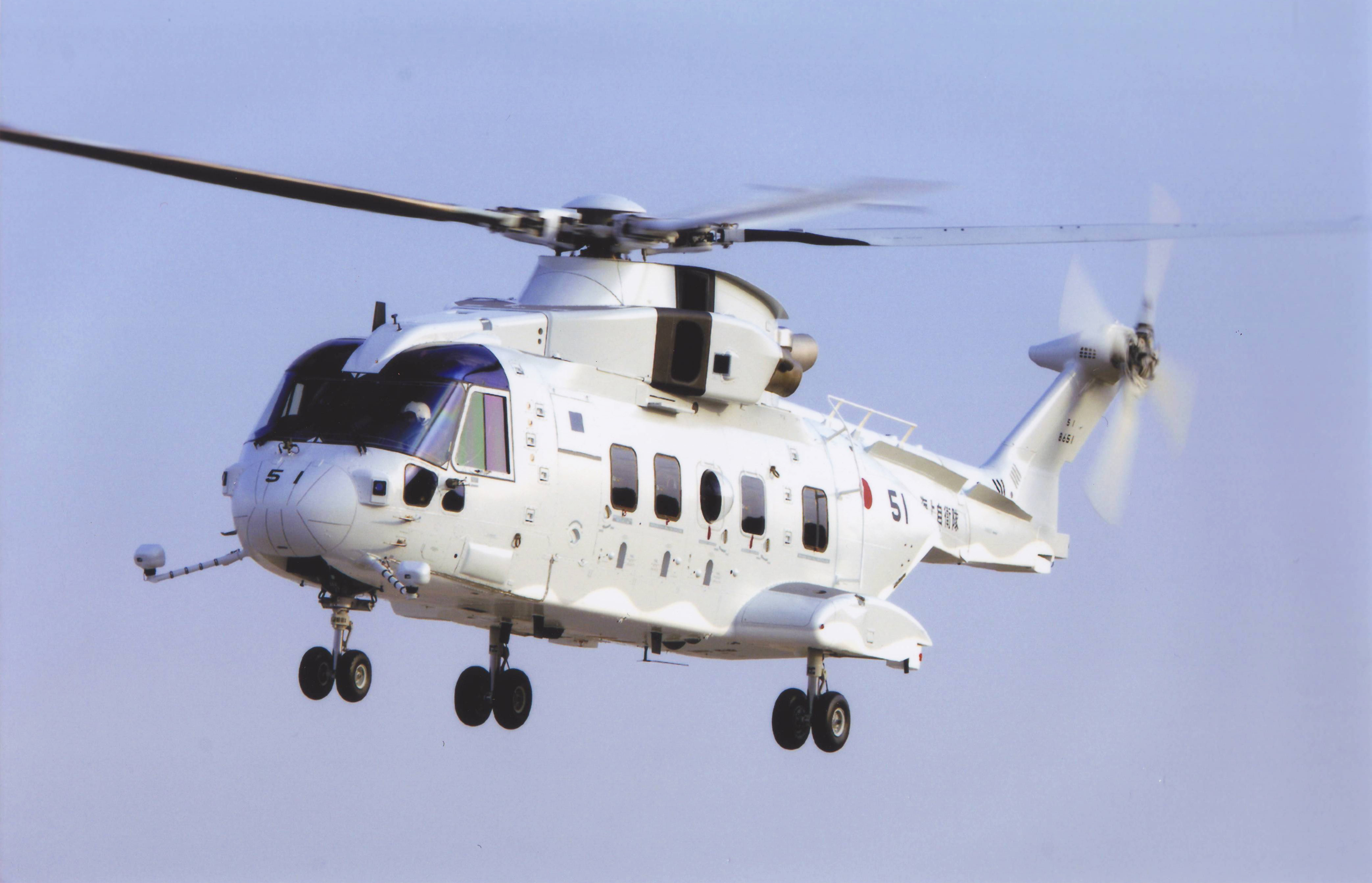
- 111 Squadron MCH-101
- Active: February 16, 1974 - present
- Country: Japan
- Allegiance: Fleet Air Force
- Branch: Japan Maritime Self-Defense Force

Aircraft flown
- Multirole helicopter: MCH-101

Mine Countermeasures Helicopter Squadron 111 (第111航空隊, dai-111-koukuutai) is a squadron of the Japan Maritime Self-Defense Force based at Marine Corps Air Station Iwakuni in Yamaguchi Prefecture, Japan. It operates MCH-101 aircraft.

As of 2016 there were seven MCH-101 aircraft in service with the squadron and plans for a total of 11. There were also discussions for the purchase for over a dozen additional aircraft.

== History ==
Two retired MH-53E helicopters of the squadron were sold to the US in 2015 for their components. The US was running short of parts for its own fleet of the aging aircraft.

== Current aircraft ==
- 10 AgustaWestland MCH-101 helicopters (2008–present)

== Aircraft operated ==
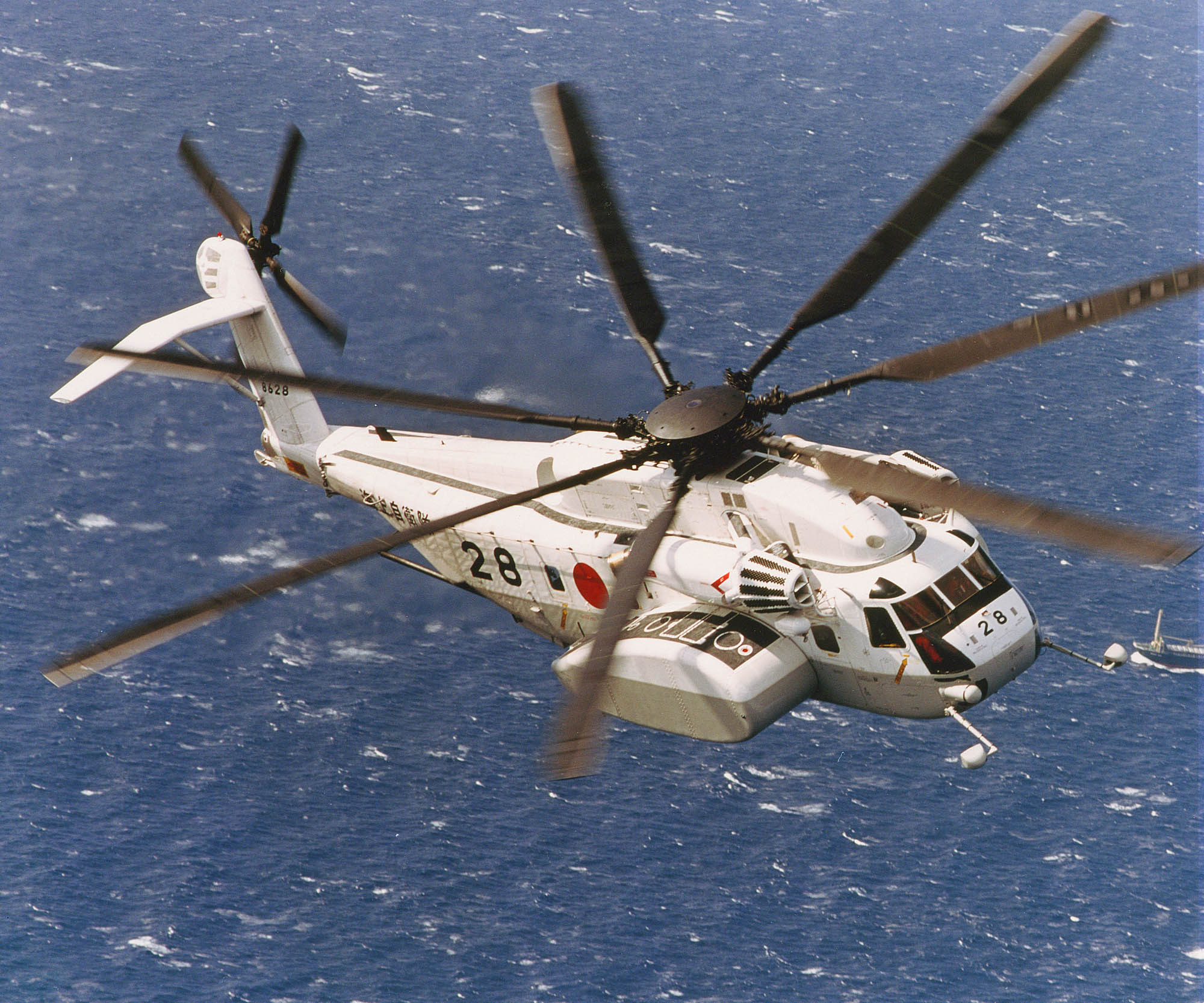
Sikorsky MH-53E Sea Dragon of 111 Squadron

- KV-107II-3/KV-107IIA-3 (1974-1990)
- Sikorsky MH-53E Sea Dragon (1990-2017)
