= Fleet Air Force (JMSDF) =

- 航空集団
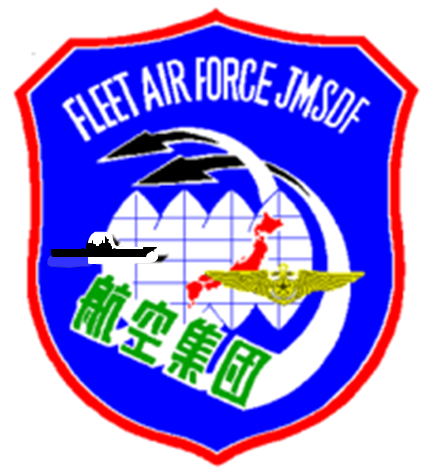
- Fleet Air Force emblem
- Active: 1 September 1961
- Country: Japan
- Branch: Japan Maritime Self-Defense Force
- Type: Naval aviation
- Size: 11,000
- Garrison/HQ: Naval Air Facility Atsugi
- Anniversaries: 1 September

Insignia
- Roundel

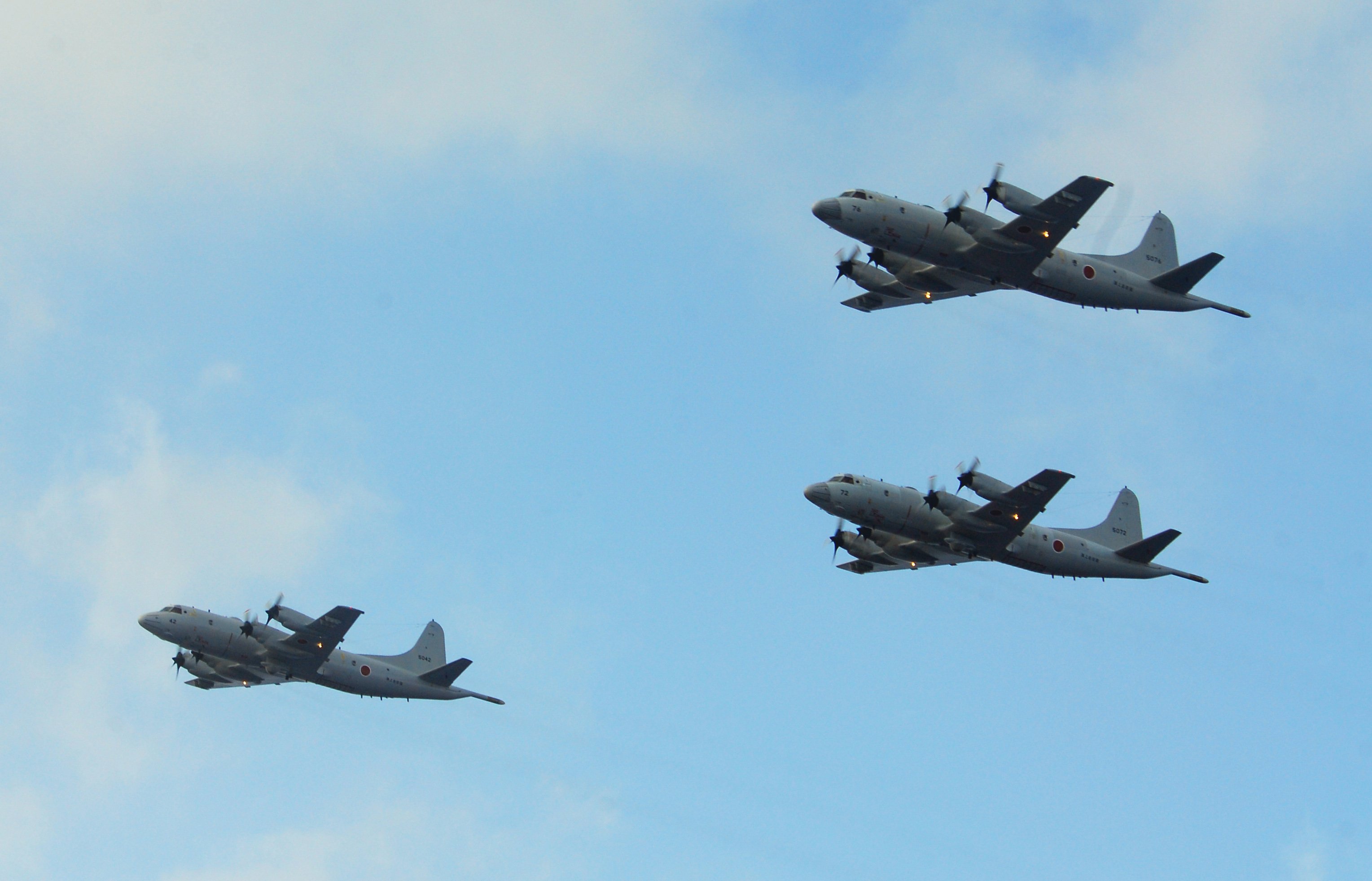
Three JMSDF P-3C Orions flying in formation during 2011

In the Japan Maritime Self-Defense Force (JMSDF), the Fleet Air Force (Japanese: 航空集団, romanized: kōkū shūdan) is its naval aviation branch, responsible for both fixed-wing and rotary aircraft and headquartered in Naval Air Facility Atsugi. As of 2012, it was equipped with over 200 fixed-wing aircraft and 150 helicopters. These aircraft operate from bases throughout Japan, as well as from the JMSDF's ships.

== History ==
The JMSDF's first aircraft were 16 Lockheed P2V Neptune maritime patrol aircraft, which were provided to the force by the United States Navy in 1956. The US Navy also provided Japan with 60 Grumman S-2 Trackers from 1957. During the 1980s, the JMSDF's force of 82 Neptunes (most of which were the locally built Kawasaki P-2J variant) was replaced by about 100 Lockheed P-3 Orions. The JMSDF's first combat helicopters were the Mitsubishi HSS-2 (the Japanese variant of the Sikorsky SH-3 Sea King). These helicopters were replaced by SH-60Js during the 1990s.

The JMSDF is the only force to operate minesweeping helicopters other than the US Navy. The first helicopters used for this purpose were eight V-107As. These helicopters were replaced by eleven MH-53Es during the 1990s. Seven MCH-101 helicopters have been ordered to replace the MH-53Es, of which five had been delivered by mid-2012.

The Diet of Japan approved the modification of the ships of the Izumo-class to operate STOVL aircraft and in 2019 ordered 42 STOVL Lockheed Martin F-35 Lightning IIs. The US Marine Corps will at first operate in cooperation their own F-35Bs to build up a Japanese capability to operate this type. The Asahi Shimbun quotes Japan's Defense Minister Takeshi Iwaya "The Izumo-class aircraft carrier role is to strengthen the air defense in the Pacific Ocean and to ensure the safety of the Self-Defense Force pilots." He also states, "There may be no runway available for the US aircraft in an emergency. I cannot say that the US F-35B should never be placed on an [JMSDF] escort vessel." The current plan is for the Japan Air Self-Defense Force to operate the aircraft once delivered.

== Equipment ==
The Japan Maritime Self-Defense Force aviation maintains a large naval air force, including 201 fixed-wing aircraft and 145 helicopters. Most of these aircraft are used in anti-submarine warfare operations.

Aircraft	Origin	Type	Variant	In service	Notes
Maritime patrol
Kawasaki P-1	Japan	ASW / Maritime patrol		33	3 on order Successor to the P-3 Orion
Lockheed P-3 Orion	United States	ASW / Maritime patrol	P-3C	42	Being replaced by Kawasaki P-1
Lockheed EP-3	United States	ELINT	EP-3 ELINT	5	
Lockheed OP-3	United States	Surveillance	OP-3C	4	
Learjet 35	United States	Surveillance	36	4	C-36A - JMSDF designation
Transport
Lockheed C-130 Hercules	United States	Transport	C-130R	6	
ShinMaywa US-2	Japan	SAR / Transport		6	
Super King Air	United States	Utility	90	5	
Helicopters
AgustaWestland AW101	Italy / United Kingdom	Minesweeper / Transport	MCH-101	12	1 on order, more will be produced
Mitsubishi H-60	Japan / United States	SAR	SH-60J	10	
Mitsubishi H-60	Japan / United States	ASW	SH-60K	73	
Mitsubishi H-60	Japan / United States	ASW	SH-60L		12 on order Improved version of SH-60K
Trainer aircraft
Fuji T-5	Japan	Trainer	—	32	
Super King Air	United States	Utility	90	12	
P-3 Orion	United States	Conversion trainer	UP-3D	3	
Airbus H135	Germany	Helicopter trainer	TH-135	15	

== Current organization ==
The organization of the JMSDF's aviation units is based on that of the US Navy. The main organizational units are Koku Shudan (air groups), Kokugun (air wings), Kōkūtai (air squadrons) and Hikōtai (flights).

As at mid-2012, the structure of the JMSDF's aviation units was as follows:

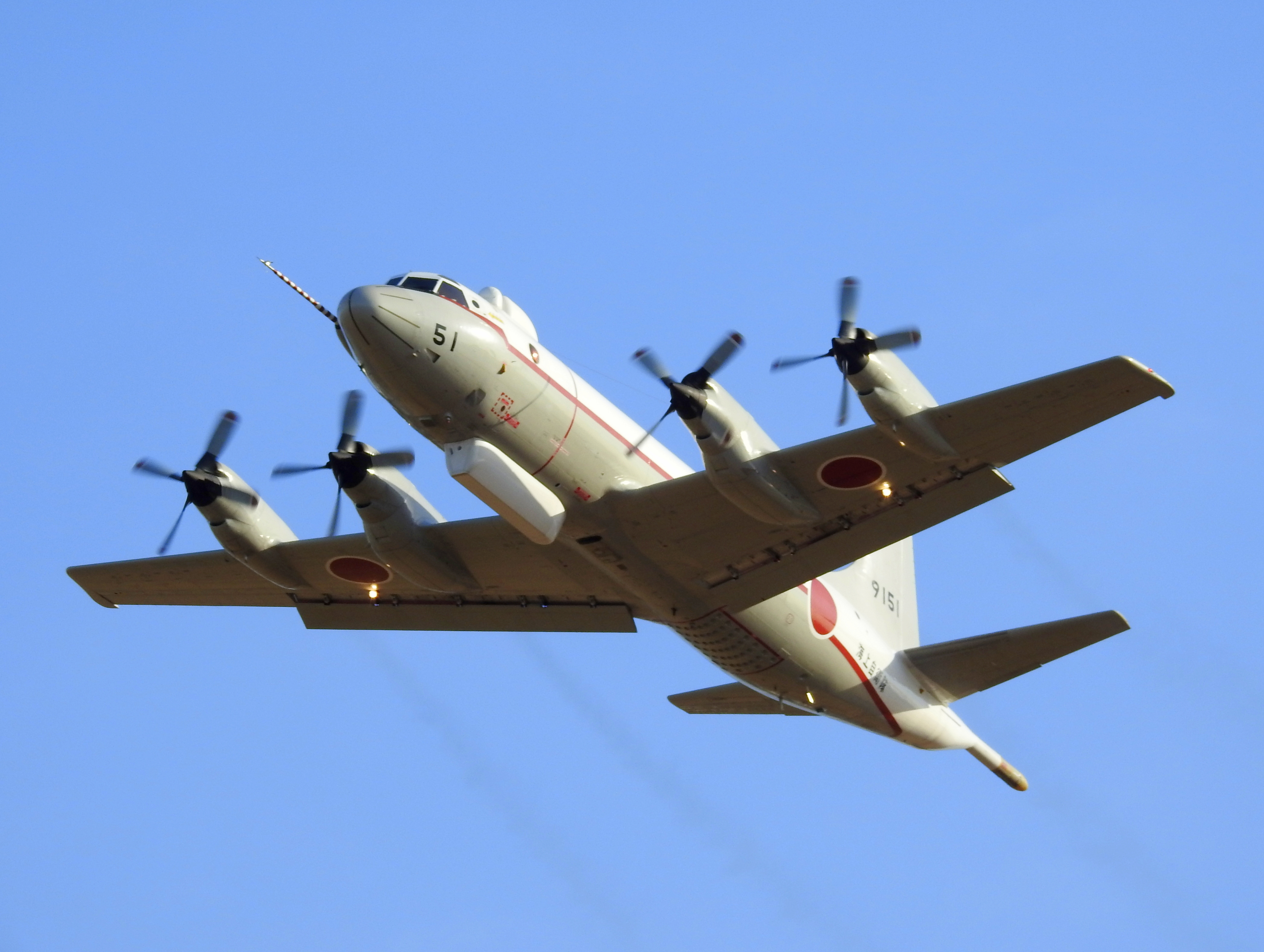
Japan Maritime Self-Defense Force Lockheed UP-3C Orion #9151

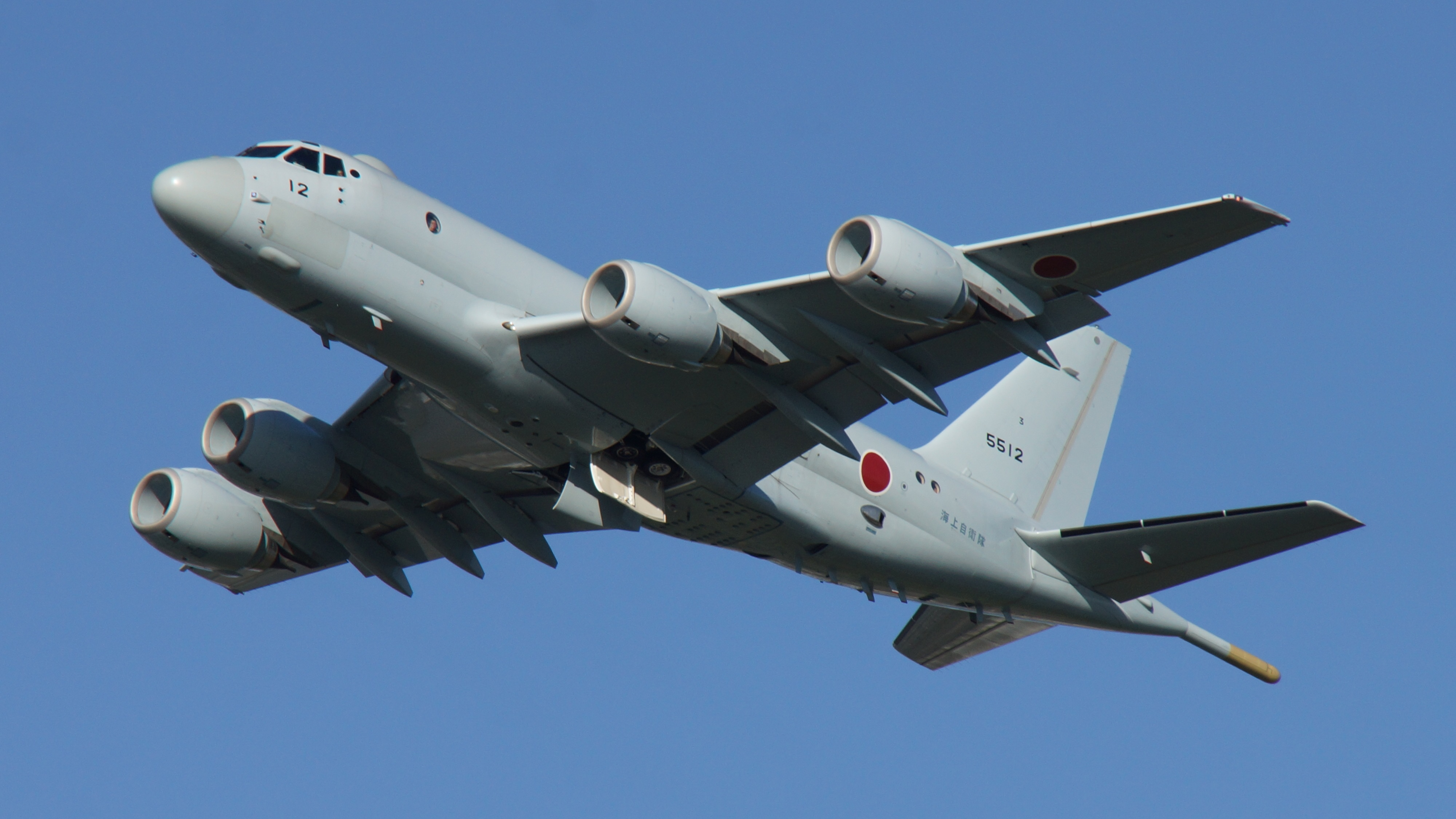
Kawasaki P-1

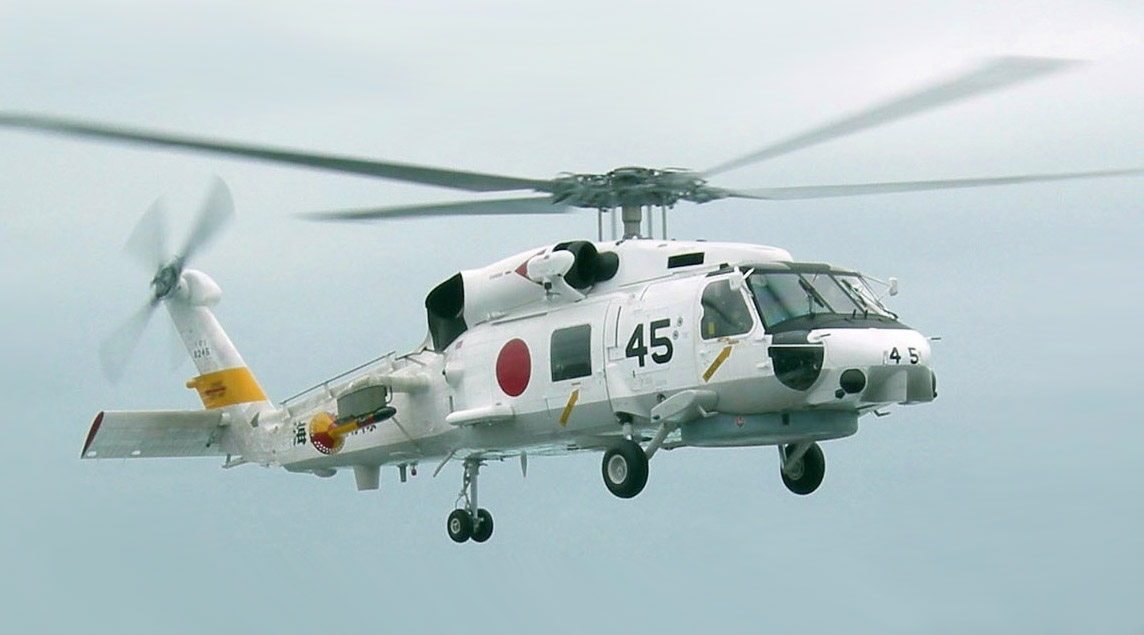
A JMSDF SH-60J Seahawk helicopter from JDS Haruna lands on board USS Russell in 2007.

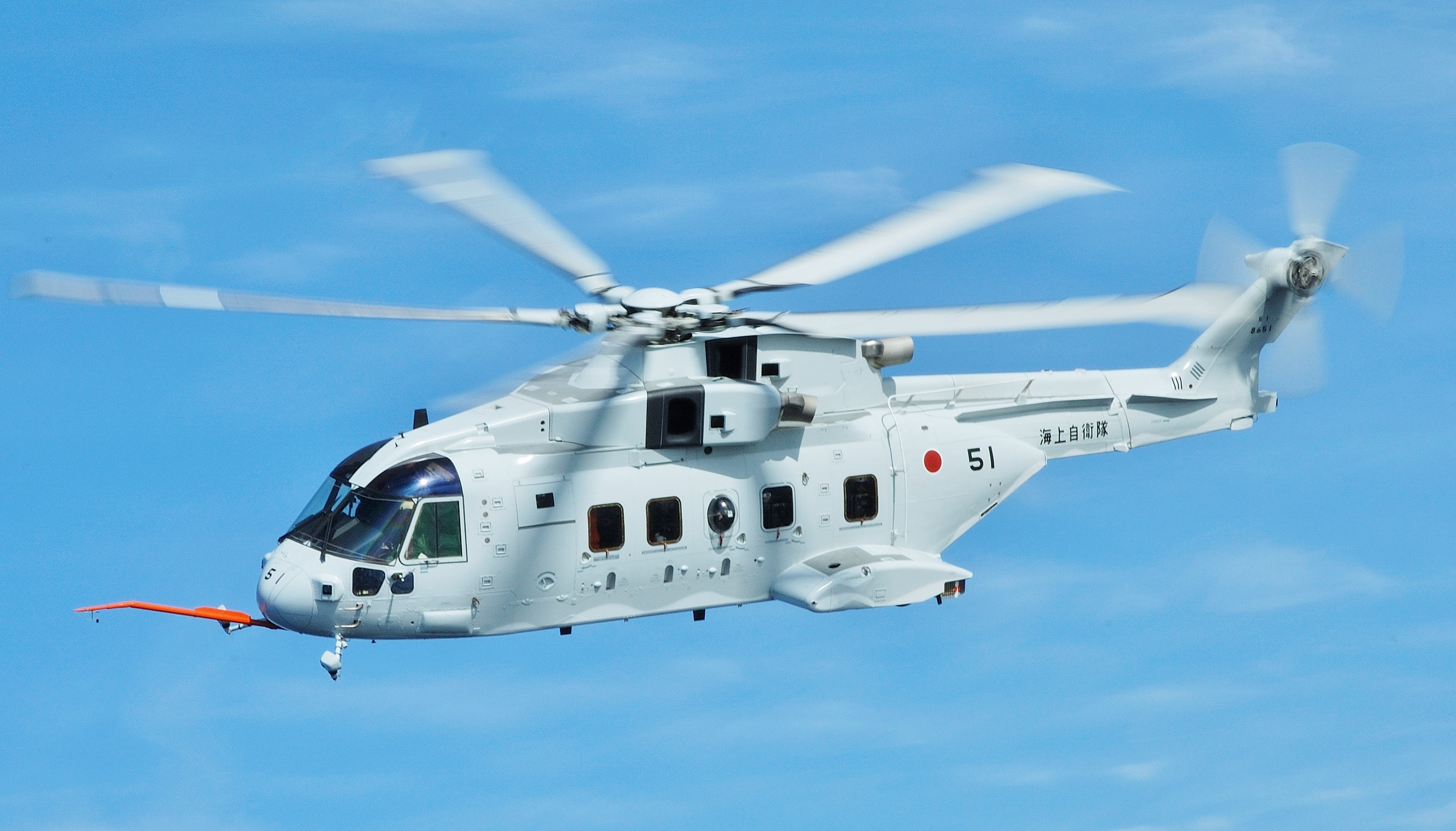
Japanese MCH-101

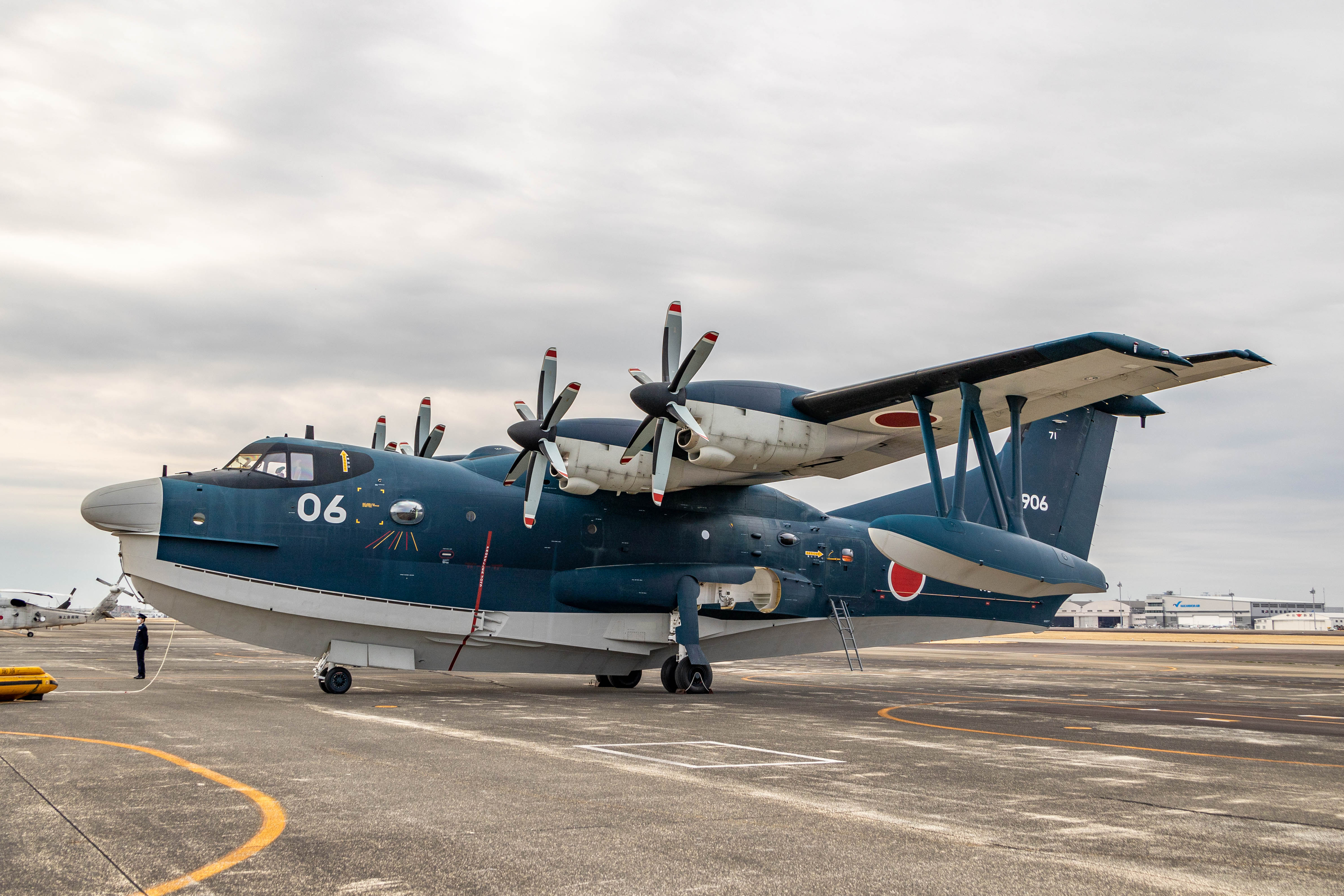
ShinMaywa US-2

Fleet Air Force (Atsugi Air Base)

- Fleet Air Wing 1 (Kanoya Air Field)
  - Air Patrol Squadron 1 (P-3C Orion, Kawasaki P-1)
  - Maintenance and Supply Squadron 1
  - Air Station Squadron Kanoya
- Fleet Air Wing 2 (Hachinohe Air Base)
  - Air Patrol Squadron 2 (P-3C Orion)
  - Maintenance and Supply Squadron 2
  - Air Station Squadron Hachinohe
- Fleet Air Wing 4 (Atsugi Air Base)
  - Air Patrol Squadron 3 (Kawasaki P-1)
  - Maintenance and Supply Squadron 4
  - Air Station Squadron Atsugi
  - Air Station Iwoto
    - Auxiliary Air Facility Minamitorishima
- Fleet Air Wing 5 (Naha Air Base)
  - Air Patrol Squadron 5 (P-3C Orion/Kawasaki P-1)
  - Maintenance and Supply Squadron 5
  - Air Station Squadron Naha
- Fleet Air Wing 21 (Tateyama Air Base)
  - Air ASW Helicopter Squadron 21 (JMSDF Tateyama Air Base SH-60J/K)
  - Air ASW Helicopter Squadron 23 (JMSDF Maizuru Helipoat SH-60J/K)
  - Air ASW Helicopter Squadron 25 (JMSDF Ōminato Base SH-60J/K)
  - Helicopter Rescue Squadron 73 (Tateyama Air Base UH-60J)
    - Helicopter Rescue Detachment Ominato
    - Helicopter Rescue Detachment Iwoto
  - Maintenance and Supply Squadron 21
  - Air Station Squadron Tateyama
- Fleet Air Wing 22 (Omura Air Base)
  - Air ASW Helicopter Squadron 22 (Omura Air Base SH-60J/K)
  - Air ASW Helicopter Squadron 24 (Komatsushima Air Base SH-60J/K)
  - Air Rescue Helicopter Squadron 72 (Omura Air Base UH-60J)
    - Helicopter Rescue Detachment Kanoya
    - Helicopter Rescue Detachment Tokushima
  - Maintenance and Supply Squadron 22
  - Air Station Squadron Omura
- Fleet Air Wing 31 (Iwakuni Air Base)
  - Air Rescue Squadron 71 (Atsugi Air Base US-1A, US-2)
  - Air Reconnaissance Squadron 81 (Iwakuni Air Base EP-3, OP-3C)
  - Air Training Support Squadron 91 (Iwakuni Air Base UP-3D, U-36A)
  - Maintenance and Supply Squadron 31
  - Drone Maintenance Squadron
  - Air Station Squadron Iwakuni
- Air Development Squadron 51 (Atsugi Air Base)
- Air Transport Squadron 61 (Atsugi Air Base C-130R, LC-90)
- Mine Countermeasures Helicopter Squadron 111 (Iwakuni Air Base MCH-101)
- Air Repair Squadron 1 (Kanoya Air Field)
- Air Repair Squadron 2 (Hachinohe Air Base)
- Air Control Service Group (Atsugi Air Base)
- Mobile Construction Group (Hachinohe Air Base)

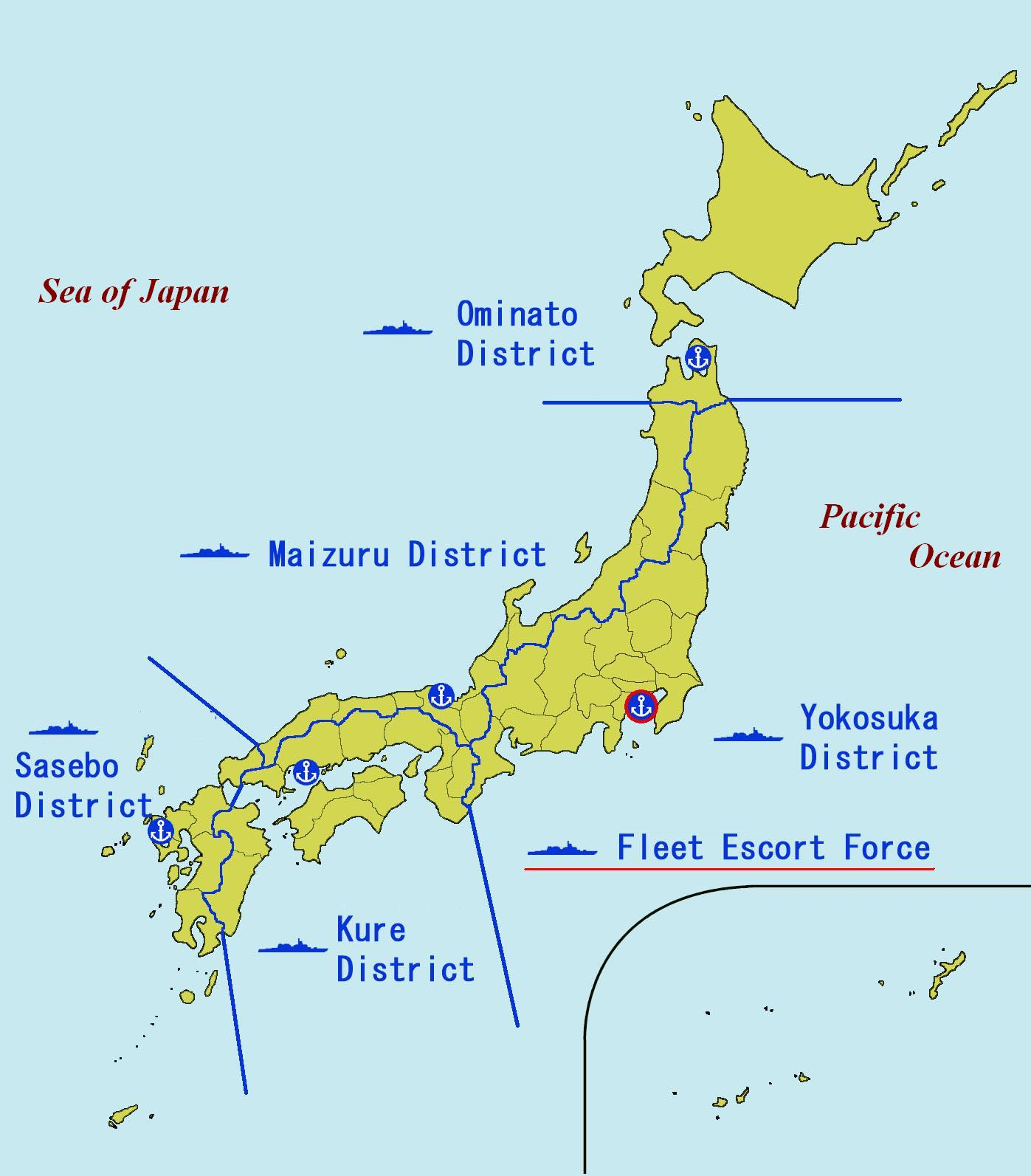
JMSDF District Forces

Units attached to Naval District destroyer fleets

- Kure District Fleet
  - Komatsushima Air Squadron (SH-60J, Komatsushima Heliport)
- Ōminato District Fleet
  - Ōminato Air Squadron (SH-60J, Ōminato Air Field)
  - Ōminato Flight (UH-60J)
- Sasebo District Fleet
  - Ōmura Air Squadron (SH-60J, Ōmura Air Base)
- Yokosuka District Fleet
  - Shirase Flight (SH-60J, Tateyama Air Base)

Air Training Command

- Shimofusa Air Training Group (Shimofusa Air Base)
  - 203 Air Training Squadron (P-3C)
  - 205 Air Training Squadron (no aircraft)
- Tokushima Air Training Group (Tokushima Airport)
  - 202 Air Training Squadron (Beechcraft TC-90 King Air, Beechcraft UC-90 King Air)
- Ozuki Air Training Group (Ozuki Air Field)
  - 201 Air Training Squadron (Fuji T-5)
    - 211 Air Training Squadron (OH-6D, OH-6DA, SH-60J, Eurocopter TH-135)

== See also ==
- Imperial Japanese Navy Air Service
