= 1989 United States Navy order of battle =

In 1989, the United States Navy was on the verge of massive cuts to military spending including ship and aircraft procurement. These forces were expected to fight the Soviet Union, Warsaw Pact and other potential adversaries in case of a war breaking out. At this time, the USS Kitty Hawk (CV-63) of the Pacific Fleet was out of commission for Service Life Extension Program (SLEP) modernization, leaving the Pacific Fleet with fewer carriers.

== United States Atlantic Fleet ==
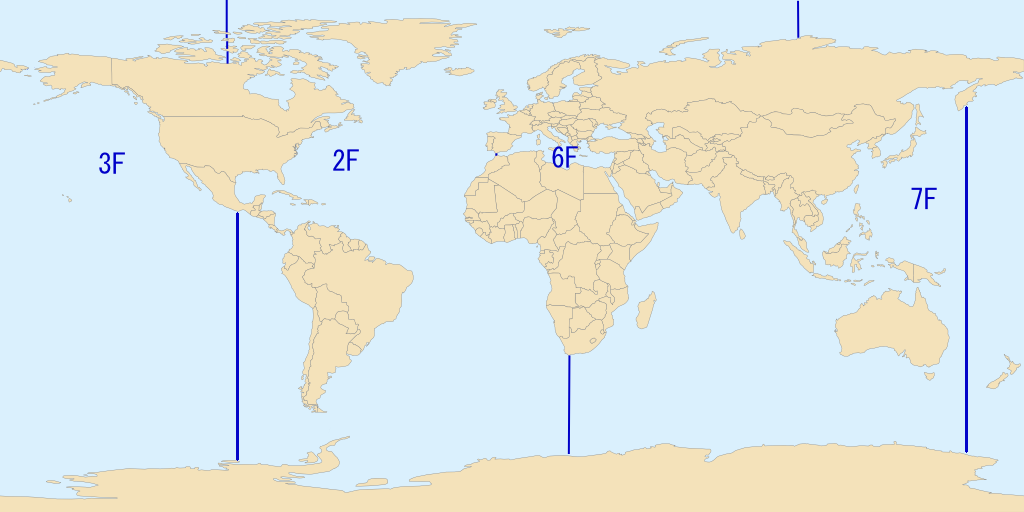
United States Navy Fleet sections in the 1980s.

=== United States 2nd Fleet ===
==== Carrier Group 2 - (Naval Station Norfolk, Virginia, US) ====
- Carrier Group 2
  - USS Coral Sea CV-43 - Midway Class Aircraft Carrier (Flagship)
    - Carrier Air Wing 13 - Tail Code: AK
      - VFA-132 Privateers - 12x F/A-18A Hornet - (NAS Cecil Field, Florida, US)
      - VFA-137 Kestrels - 12x F/A-18A Hornet - (NAS Cecil Field, Florida, US)
      - VMFA-451 Warlords (US Marine Corps) - F/A-18A Hornet - (MCAS Beaufort, South Carolina, US)
      - VA-55 Warhorses - A-6E TRAM Intruder - (NAS Oceania, Virginia, US)
      - VA-65 Tigers - A-6E TRAM Intruder/KA-6D Intruder - (NAS Oceania, Virginia, US)
      - VAQ-133 Wizards - EA-6B Prowler
      - VAW-127 Seabats - E-2C Hawkeye
      - HS-17 Neptune's Riders - SH-3H Sea King

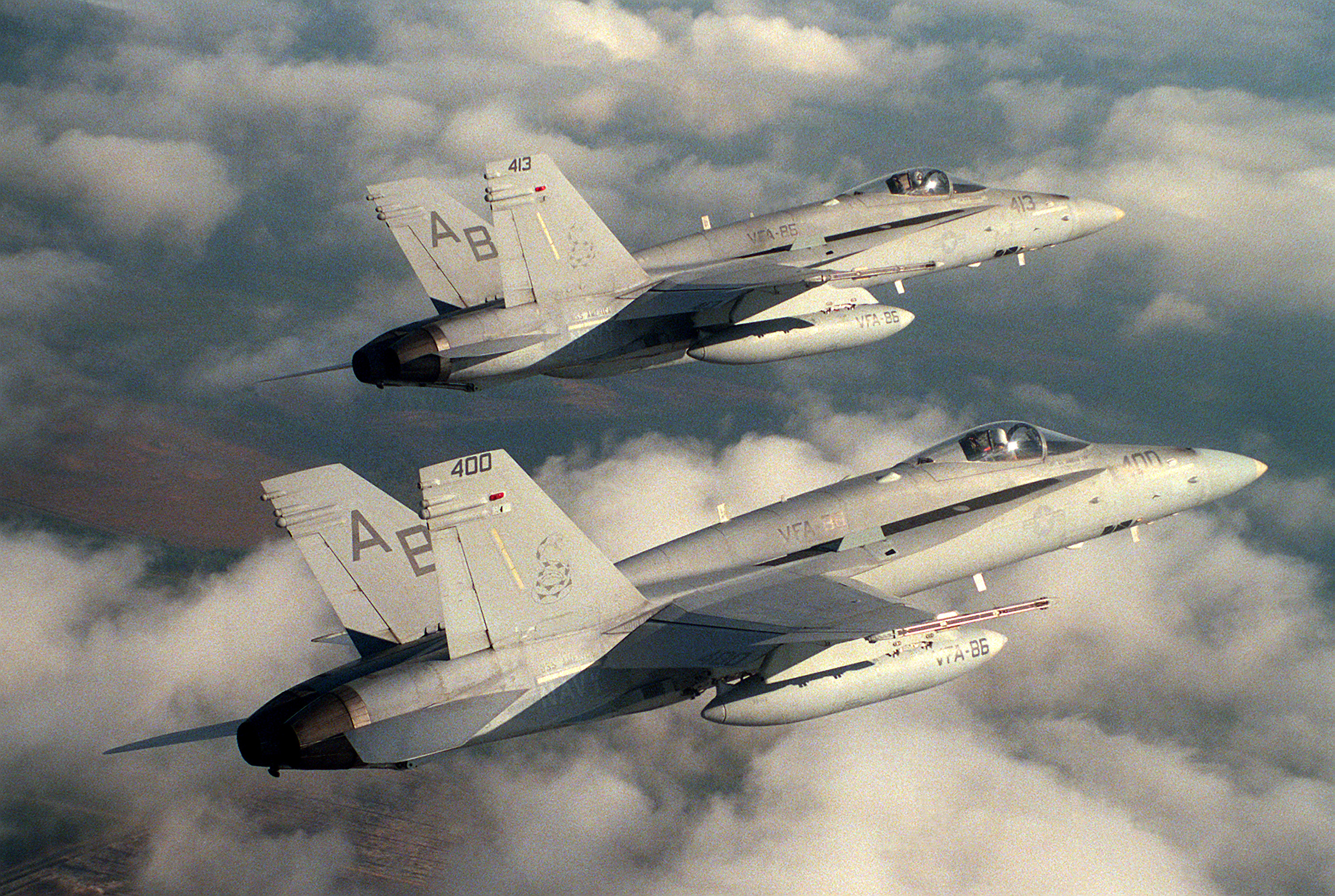
F/A-18C Hornets from VFA-86 Sidewinders over Townsend Bombing Range January 26, 1989.

Cruiser-Destroyer Group 2 - (Naval Station Norfolk, Virginia, US)

- USS America CV-66 - Kitty Hawk Class Aircraft Carrier (America Sub-Class) - (Flagship)
  - Carrier Air Wing 1 - Tail Code: AB
    - VF-33 Starfighters - F-14A Tomcat
    - VF-102 Diamondbacks - F-14A Tomcat
    - VFA-82 Marauders - 10x F/A-18C Hornet - (NAS Cecil Field, Florida, US)
    - VFA-86 Sidewinders - 10x F/A-18C Hornet - (NAS Cecil Field, Florida, US)
    - VA-85 Black Falcons - A-6E TRAM Intruder/KA-6D Intruder - (NAS Oceania, Virginia, US)
    - VAQ-137 Rooks - EA-6B Prowler - (NAS Whidbey Island, Washington State, US)
    - VAW-123 Screwtops - 4x E-2C Hawkeye
    - VS-32 Maulers - 10x S-3A Viking
    - HS-11 Dragon Slayers - 6x SH-3H Sea King

Carrier Group 6 - (Naval Station Mayport, Florida, US)

- USS Forrestal CV-59 - Forrestal Class Aircraft Carrier
  - Carrier Air Wing 6 - Tail Code: AE
    - VF-11 Red Rippers - F-14A Tomcat
    - VF-31 Tomcatters - F-14A Tomcat
    - VA-37 Bulls - A-7E Corsair II
    - VA-105 Gunslingers - A-7E Corsair II
    - VA-176 Thunderbolts - A-6E TRAM Intruder/KA-6D Intruder
    - VAQ-142 Grim Watchdogs - EA-6B Prowler
    - VS-28 Gamblers - S-3A Viking
    - VAW-122 Steeljaws - E-2C Hawkeye
    - HS-15 Red Lions - SH-3H Sea King
- USS Saratoga CV-60 - Forrestal Class Aircraft Carrier
  - Carrier Air Wing 17 - Tail Code: AA
    - VF-74 Be-Devilers - 6x F-14A Tomcat/6x F-14A+ Tomcat
    - VF-103 Sluggers - 8x F-14A Tomcat/7x F-14A+ Tomcat
    - VFA-81 Sunliners - 14x F/A-18C Hornet
    - VFA-83 Rampagers - 14x F/A-18C Hornet
    - VA-35 Black Panthers - 10x A-6E TRAM Intruder/KA-6D Intruder
    - VAQ-132 Scorpions - EA-6B Prowler
    - VS-30 Diamondcutters - 8x S-3B Viking
    - VAW-125 Torchbearers/Tigertails - E-2C Hawkeye
    - HS-9 Sea Griffins - SH-3H Sea Kings

Carrier Group 8 - (Naval Station Norfolk, Virginia, US)

- USS Dwight D. Eisenhower CVN-69 - Nimitz Class Aircraft Carrier - (Naval Station Norfolk, Virginia, US)
  - Carrier Air Wing 7 - Tail Code: AG
    - VF-142 Ghostriders - F-14A Tomcat
    - VF-143 Pukin' Dogs - F-14A Tomcat
    - VFA-131 Wildcats - F/A-18A Hornet
    - VFA-136 Knight Hawks - F/A-18A Hornet
    - VA-34 Blue Blasters - A-6E TRAM Intruder/KA-6D Intruder
    - VAQ-140 Patriots - EA-6B Prowler
    - VAW-121 Bluetails - E-2C Hawkeye
    - VS-31 Topcats - S-3B Viking
    - HS-5 Night Dippers - SH-3H Sea King

==== Destroyer Squadron 6 (Charleston Naval Shipyard, South Carolina, US) ====
- USS Carr FFG-52 - Oliver Hazard Perry Class Frigate

==== Commander, Submarine Force, U.S. Atlantic Fleet (COMSUBLANT) ====
- USS Baton Rouge SSN-689 - Los Angeles Class Attack Submarine
- Submarine Squadron 8 (Naval Station Norfolk, Virginia, US)
  - USS Memphis SSN-691 - Los Angeles Class Attack Submarine
  - USS Jacksonville SSN-699 - Los Angeles Class Attack Submarine
- Submarine Development Squadron 12 (Naval Submarine Base New London, Groton, Connecticut, US)
  - USS Augusta SSN-710 - Los Angeles Class Attack Submarine

=== United States 6th Fleet ===
==== Task Force 60 ====
- Theodore Roosevelt Carrier Battlegroup *(Part of 6th Fleet Jan 11 to June 20)
  - USS Theodore Roosevelt CVN-71 - Nimitz Class Aircraft Carrier
    - Carrier Air Wing 8 - Tail Code: AJ
      - VF-41 Black Aces - F-14A Tomcat
      - VF-84 Jolly Rogers - F-14A Tomcat
      - VFA-15 Valions - F/A-18A Hornet
      - VFA-87 Golden Warriors - F/A-18A Hornet
      - VA-35 Black Panthers - A-6E TRAM Intruder
      - VA-36 Roadrunners - A-6E TRAM Intruder
      - VAQ-141 Shadowhawks - EA-6B Prowler
      - VAW-124 Bear Aces - E-2C Hawkeye
      - VS-24 Scouts - S-3A Viking
      - HS-9 Griffins - SH-3H Sea King
- USS South Carolina CGN-37 - California Class Cruiser - (Naval Station Norfolk, Virginia, US)
- USS Leyte Gulf CG-55 - Ticonderoga Class VLS Cruiser - (Naval Station Mayport, Florida, US)
- USS Charles F. Adams DDG-2 - Charles F. Adams Class Destroyer (Naval Station Mayport, Florida, US)
- USS Sellers DDG-11 - Charles F. Adams Class Destroyer (Charleston Naval Shipyard, South Carolina, US)
- USS Conyngham DDG-17 - Charles F. Adams Class Destroyer
- USS Farragut DDG-37 - Farragut Class Destroyer - (Naval Station Norfolk, Virginia, US)
- USS William V. Pratt DDG-44 - Farragut Class Destroyer - (Charleston Naval Shipyard, South Carolina, US)
  - Submarine Squadron 8 (Naval Station Norfolk, Virginia, US)
    - USS Hyman G. Rickover SSN-709 - Los Angeles Class Attack Submarine

== Commander in Chief, United States Pacific Fleet ==
=== United States 3rd Fleet ===
==== Commander, Naval Air Forces, Pacific Fleet ====
- Battle Group Bravo
  - Carrier Group 7
    - USS Nimitz CVN-68 - Nimitz Class Aircraft Carrier (Puget Sound, Washington State, US)
      - Carrier Air Wing 9 - Tail Code: NG
        - VF-24 Fighting Renegades - F-14A Tomcat --> F-14A+ Tomcat
        - VF-211 Checkmates - F-14A Tomcat --> F-14A+ Tomcat
        - VA-146 Blue Diamonds - A-7E Corsair II --> VFA-146 Blue Diamonds - F/A-18C (N) Hornet
        - VA-147 Argonauts - A-7E Corsair II --> VFA-147 Argonauts - F/A-18C (N) Hornet
        - VA-165 Boomers - 10x A-6E TRAM Intruder/4x KA-6D Intruder - (NAS Whidbey Island, Washington State, U.S.)
        - VAQ-138 Yellow Jackets - 4x EA-6B Prowler
        - VAW-112 Golden Hawks - E-2C Hawkeye
        - VS-33 Screwbirds - S-3A Viking
        - HS-2 Golden Falcons - SH-3H Sea King
    - USS Antietam CG-54 - Ticonderoga Class VLS Class Cruiser

==== Commander, Carrier Group 1 ====
- Battle Group Echo
  - Cruiser-Destroyer Group 5
    - USS Ranger CV-61 - Forrestal Class Aircraft Carrier
      - Carrier Air Wing 2 - Tail Code: NE
        - VF-1 Wolfpack - 8x F-14A Tomcat - (NAS Miramar, California, US)
        - VF-2 Bounty Hunters - 6x F-14A Tomcat - (NAS Miramar, California, US)
        - VA-145 Swordsmen - 12x A-6E TRAM Intruder - (NAS Whidbey Island, Washington State, US)
        - VMA(AW)-121 Green Knights (US Marine Corps) - 14x A-6E TRAM Intruder - (MCAS El Toro, California, US)
        - VAQ-131 Lancers - 4x EA-6B Prowler
        - VAW-116 Sun Kings - 4x E-2C Hawkeye - (NAS Miramar, California, US)
        - VS-38 Red Griffins - 9x S-3A Viking
        - HS-14 Chargers - 6x SH-3H Sea King
- Carrier Group 3 (NAS Alameda, California, US)
  - USS Carl Vinson CVN-70 - Nimitz Class Aircraft Carrier
    - Carrier Air Wing 15 - Tail Code: NL
      - VF-51 Screaming Eagles - F-14A Tomcat
      - VF-111 Sundowners - F-14A Tomcat
      - VA-27 Royal Maces - A-7E Corsair II
      - VA-97 Warhawks - A-7E Corsair II
      - VA-52 Knightriders - A-6E SWIP Intruder/KA-6D Intruder
      - VAQ-134 Garudas - EA-6B Prowler ICAP II
      - VAW-114 Hormel Hogs - E-2C Hawkeye
      - VS-29 Dragonfires - S-3A Viking
      - HS-4 Black Knights - SH-3H Sea King
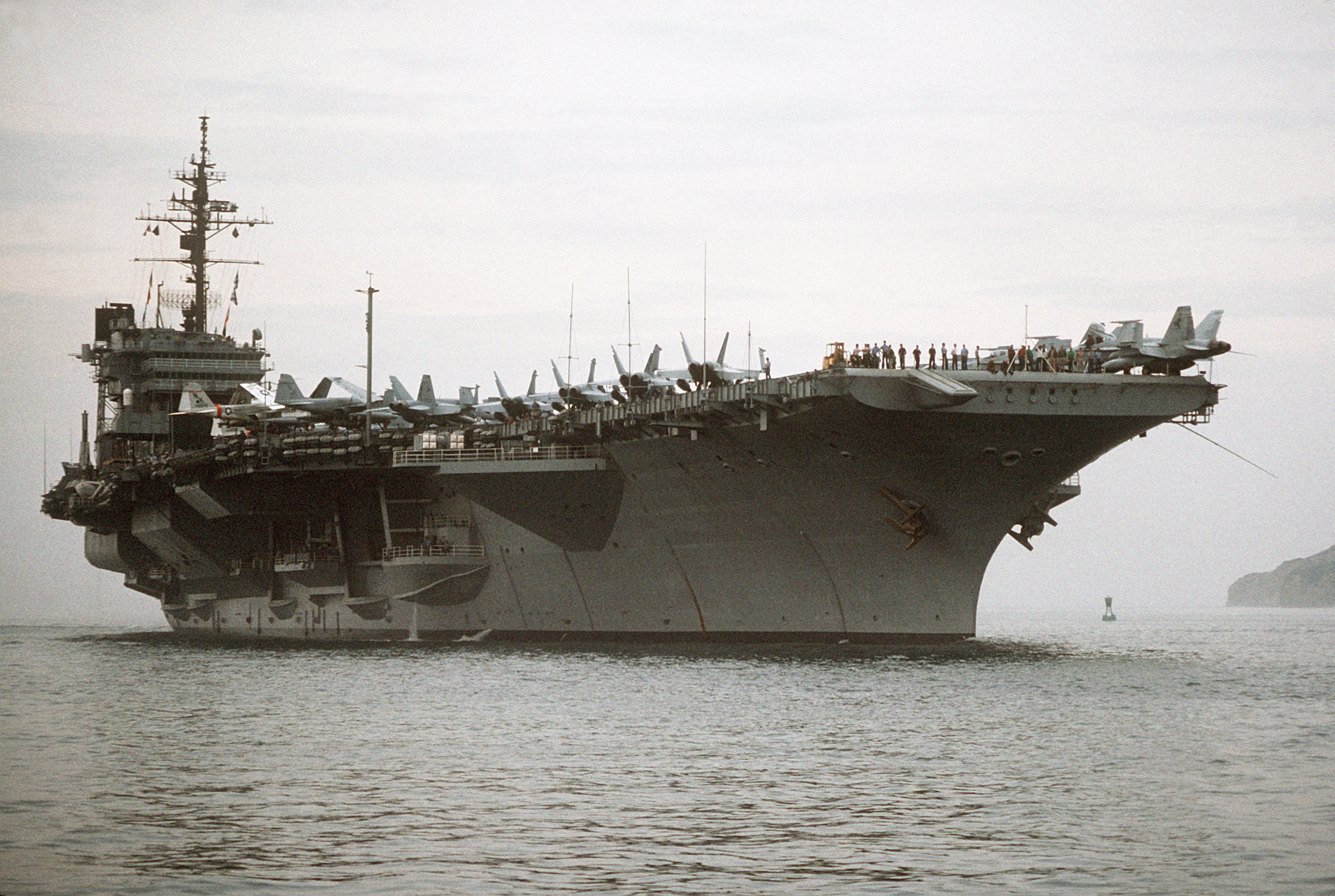
        USS Constellation CV-64 passing by Point Loma in 1989. Onboard is Carrier Air Wing 14.
- Battle Group Delta
  - USS Constellation CV-64 - Kitty Hawk Class Aircraft Carrier (NAS North Island, San Diego, California, US)
    - Carrier Air Wing 14 - Tail Code: NK
      - VF-21 Freelancers - 8x F-14A Tomcat - (NAS Miramar, California, US)
      - VF-154 Black Knights - 8x F-14A Tomcat - (NAS Miramar, California, US)
      - VFA-25 Fist of the Fleet - 10x F/A-18A Hornet - (NAS Lemoore, California, US)
      - VFA-113 Stingers - 11x F/A-18A Hornet - (NAS Lemoore, California, US)
      - VA-196 Main Battery - 10x A-6E TRAM Intruder/4x KA-6D Intruder - (NAS Whidbey Island, Washington State, US)
      - VAQ-139 Cougars - 4x EA-6B Prowler - (NAS Whidbey Island, Washington State, US)
      - VAW-113 Black Eagles - E-2C Hawkeye - (NAS Miramar, California, US)
      - VS-37 Sawbucks - S-3A Viking - (NAS North Island, San Diego, California, US)
      - HS-8 Eightballers - SH-3H Sea King - (NAS North Island, San Diego, California, US)
- USS Buchanan DDG-14 - Charles F. Adams Class Destroyer
- USS Harold E. Holt FF-1074 - Knox Class Frigate

==== Cruiser-Destroyer Group 3 (NAS Alameda, California, US) ====
- USS Enterprise CVN-65 - Enterprise Class Aircraft Carrier - (NAS Alameda, California)
  - Carrier Air Wing 11 - Tail Code: NH
    - VF-114 Aardvarks - 8x F-14A Tomcat - (NAS Miramar, California, US)
    - VF-213 Black Lions - 8x F-14A Tomcat - (NAS Miramar, California, US)
    - VA-22 Fighting Redcocks - 10x A-7E Corsair II - (NAS Lemoore, California, US)
    - VA-94 Shrikes - 10x A-7E Corsair II - (NAS Lemoore, California, US)
    - VA-95 Green Lizards - 10x A-6E TRAM Intruder/4x KA-6D Intruder - (NAS Whidbey Island, Washington State, US)
    - VAQ-135 Black Ravens - 4x EA-6B Prowler - (NAS Whidbey Island, Washington State, US)
    - VAW-117 Wallbangers - 4x E-2C Hawkeye - (NAS Miramar, California, US)
    - VS-21 Redtails - 11x S-3A Viking - (NAS North Island, San Diego, California, US)
    - HS-6 Indians - 6x SH-3H Sea King - (NAS North Island, San Diego, California, US)
- USS Valley Forge CG-50 - Ticonderoga Class Cruiser - (Naval Base San Diego, California)
- USS Fox CG-33 - Belknap Class Cruiser - (Naval Base San Diego, California)

==== Destroyer Squadron 23 ====
- USS Herny B. Wilson DDG-7 - Charles F. Adams Class Destroyer
- USS Marvin Shields FF-1066 - Knox Class Frigate

==== Commander, Submarine Force, U.S. Pacific Fleet (COMSUBPAC) ====
- Submarine Squadron 7 (Naval Station Pearl Harbor, Hawaii, US)
  - USS Los Angeles SSN-688 - Los Angeles Class Attack Submarine
- Submarine Group 5
  - Submarine Squadron 11 (Naval Base Point Loma, San Diego, California, US)
    - USS Louisville SSN-724 - Los Angeles Class Attack Submarine
- Submarine Squadron 17 (Naval Submarine Base Bangor, Kitsap, Washington State, US)
  - USS Alabama SSBN-731 - Ohio Class Ballistic Missile Submarine
  - USS Alaska SSBN-732 - Ohio Class Ballistic Missile Submarine
U.S 7th Fleet Installations in Japan

=== United States 7th Fleet ===
- USS Blue Ridge LCC-19 - Blue Ridge Class Command Ship - Flagship of the 7th Fleet (U.S. Fleet Activities Yokosuka, Japan)

==== Commander, Battle Force 7th Fleet (CTF-70) - Battle Group Alfa - (U.S. Fleet Activities Yokosuka, Japan) ====
- USS Midway CV-41 - Midway Class Aircraft Carrier
  - Carrier Air Wing 5 - Tail Code: NF (NAF Atsugi)
    - VFA-151 Vigilantes - 11x F/A-18A Hornet (1 loss on June 22, 1989)
    - VFA-192 Golden Dragons - 12x F/A-18A Hornet
    - VFA-195 Dambusters - 12x F/A-18A Hornet
    - VA-115 Eagles - 7x A-6E TRAM Intruder/ 2x KA-6D Intruder
    - VA-185 Nighthawks - 7x A-6E TRAM Intruder/ 2x KA-6D Intruder
    - VAQ-136 Gauntlets - 4x EA-6B Prowler ICAP II
    - VAW-115 Liberty Bells - 5x E-2C Group 0 Hawkeye
    - HS-12 Wyverns - 6x SH-3H Sea King
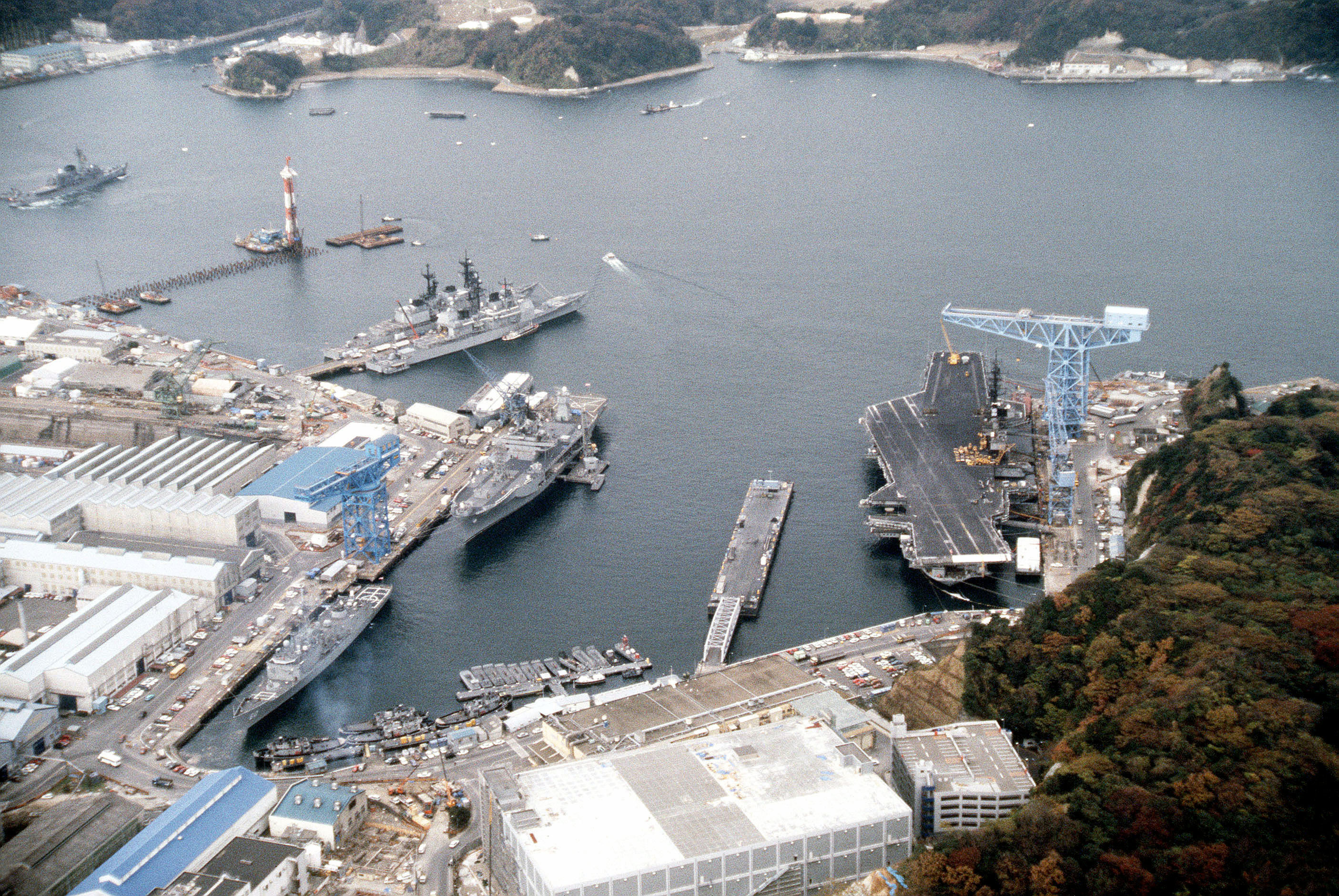
      USS Midway CV-41, USS Blue Ridge LCC-19, USS Rodney M. Davis FFG-60, USS Bunker Hill CG-52 and other vessels of the 7th Fleet at Yokosuka in December 1989.

==== Destroyer Squadron 15 - (U.S. Fleet Activities Yokosuka, Japan) ====
- USS Bunker Hill CG-52 - Ticonderoga Class VLS Class Cruiser
- USS Oldendorf DD-972 - Spruance Class Destroyer
- USS Fife DD-991 - Spruance Class Destroyer
- USS Towers DDG-9 - Charles F. Adams Class Destroyer
- USS Cochrane DDG-21 - Charles F. Adams Class Destroyer
- USS Curts FFG-38 - Oliver Hazard Perry Class Frigate
- USS Rodney M. Davis FFG-60 - Oliver Hazard Perry Class Frigate

==== U.S. Fleet Activities Sasebo, Japan ====
- USS Dubuque LPD-8 - Austin Class Amphibious transport dock
- USS Darter SS-576 - Darter Class Submarine (Sailed to Pearl Harbor on August 18)
- USS Barbel SS-580 - Barbel Class Submarine (Sailed to Pearl Harbor on September 18)
