= CVW2 =

CVW2 may refer to:

- Carrier Air Wing Two, (CVW-2) a United States Navy aircraft carrier air wing at Naval Air Station Lemoore
- Vernon/Wildlife Water Aerodrome, the ICAO code for the airport in Canada
