= SNDL =

SNDL could refer to:

- "Store now, decrypt later", variation of Harvest now, decrypt later
- Finnish Democratic Youth League, now known as Left Youth (Finland)
- Democratic Women's League of Finland, resulting in the Women's Democratic Action Centre
- Standard Naval Distribution List; see 1989 United States Navy order of battle
