= VS-29 =

Sea Control Squadron 29
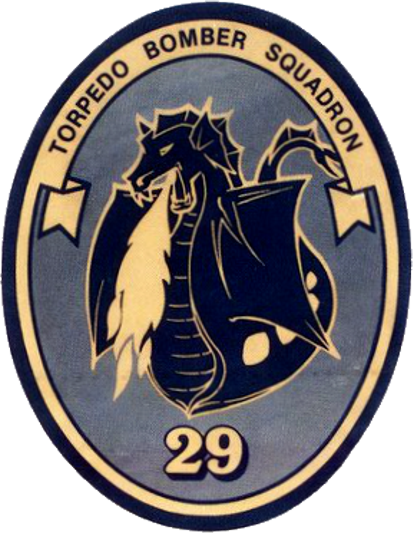
- Active: 1 April 1960 – 30 April 2004
- Country: United States of America
- Branch: United States Navy
- Garrison/HQ: NAS North Island
- Nickname(s): Dragonfires
- Equipment: Grumman S-2 Tracker; Lockheed S-3A/B Viking
- Engagements: Cold War; Vietnam War; Operation Southern Watch; Operation Desert Fox; Operation Enduring Freedom; Operation Iraqi Freedom

Sea Control Squadron 29 (VS-29) or the "Dragonfires" was a former Sea Control and anti-submarine warfare (ASW) squadron of the US Navy that existed between 1960 and 2004.

== History ==
=== As the Tromboners (1960–1975) ===
VS-29 was originally commissioned on 1 April 1960 as the Tromboners by splitting VS-21 in two, the squadron making 12 small deployments in the East Pacific between July 1960 and May 1964 aboard the aircraft carrier USS Kearsarge as part of CVSG-53 which included the recovery of the NASA Mercury capsules. From 19 June 1964 to 16 December 1964, they made their first Vietnam War cruise on Kearsarge with Grumman S-2F Trackers followed by three more Vietnam cruises on the carrier in 1966, 1968 and 1969. VS-29 made their first Atlantic deployment which was short-lived between September and November 1971 on USS Wasp. In September 1972, VS-29 made their last deployment with the Grumman Tracker (S-2E) on USS Ticonderoga as part of CVSG-53.

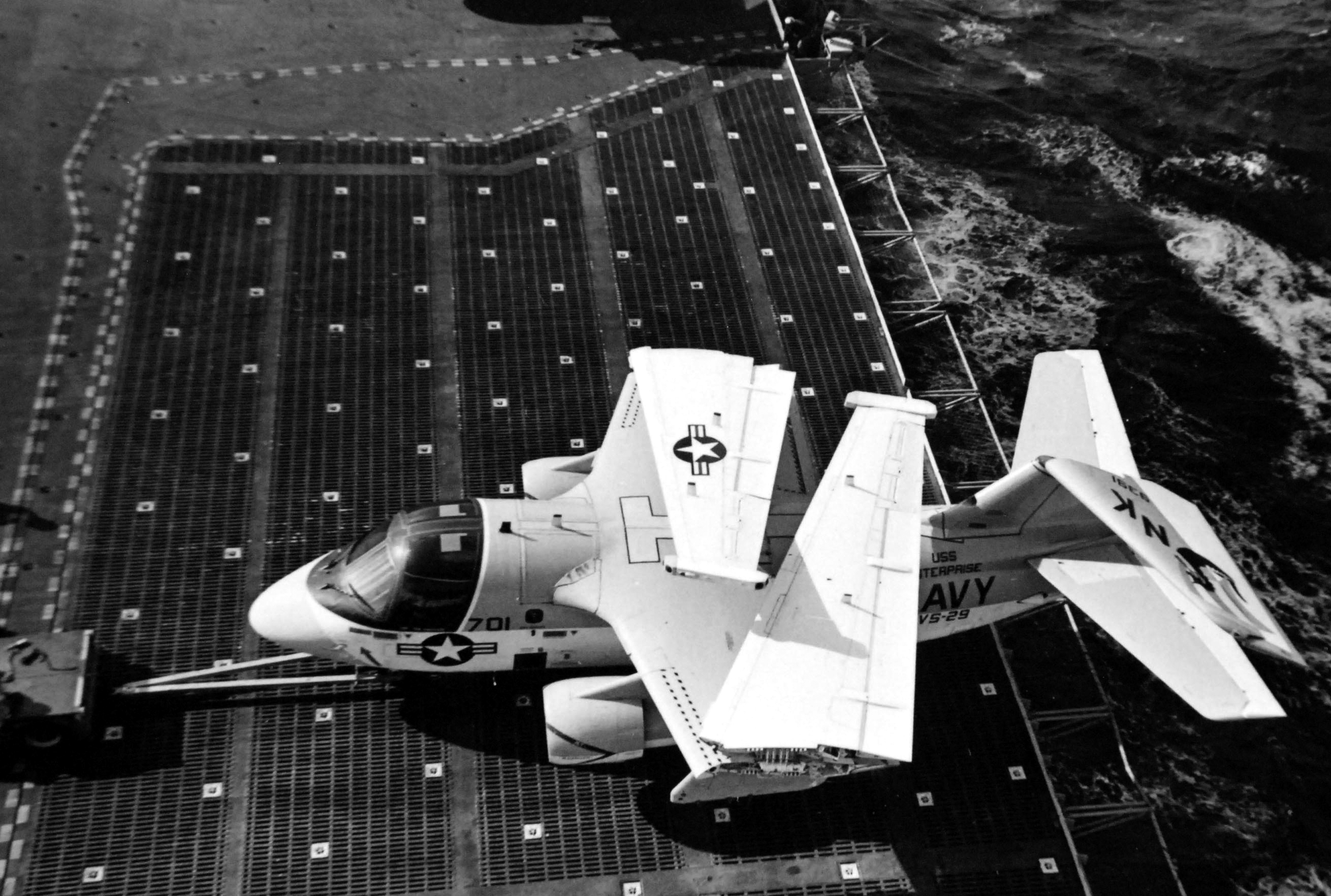
VS-29 on the maiden deployment of the S-3 Viking in 1976.

=== First years of using the S-3 Viking (1975–1982) ===
In 1975, the squadron transitioned to the Lockheed S-3A Viking before making the first West Pacific S-3 Viking deployment as part of CVW-14 on USS Enterprise between 30 July 1976 and 28 March 1977. Two more deployments (including one Westpac deployment) followed on USS Ranger as part of CVW-2. This was followed in 1981 by the first deployment of many that VS-29 would make with CVW-15, this time on USS Kitty Hawk.

=== USS Carl Vinson and CVW-15 (1983–1990) ===
After a shakedown cruise in 1982, VS-29 made history by joining the nuclear-powered carrier USS Carl Vinson on her maiden deployment, a round the world cruise from Norfolk, Virginia to NAS Alameda, California. Seven more deployments followed which included taking part in the RIMPAC 1984 and RIMPAC 1986 naval exercises. On 31 July 1990, the squadron returned from their last cruise with CVW-15 and the S-3A Viking.

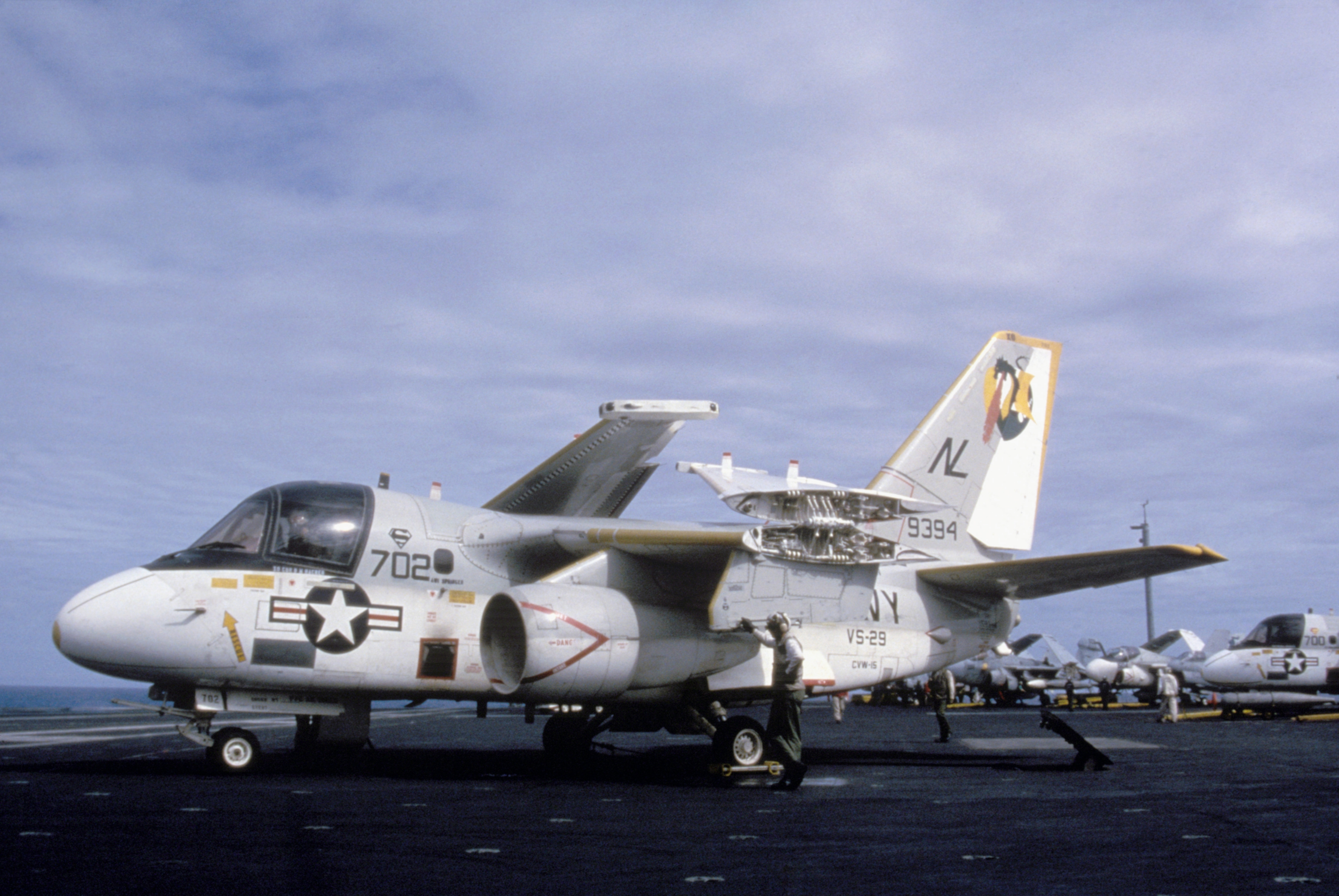
An S-3A Viking from VS-29 on USS Carl Vinson in 1985.

=== CVW-11 and final years (1991–2004) ===
VS-29 joined CVW-11 on USS Abraham Lincoln in September 1990 on its transit to the West Coast before taking part in the ship's maiden cruise on 28 May 1991 taking part in Operation Fiery Vigil in the Philippines before arriving in the Persian Gulf just after the Gulf War ended. This was the first deployment that VS-29 deployed with the S-3B Viking.

Three more deployments to the Persian Gulf followed for VS-29 between 1992 and 1995 aboard Abraham Lincoln followed by one Persian Gulf deployment between 1996 and 1997 on Kitty Hawk. After moving with CVW-11 back to Carl Vinson, VS-29 took part in RIMPAC '98 before deploying to the Persian Gulf in November 1998. During this deployment, Operation Desert Fox took place with VS-29 delivering 51,000 lb (23,000 kg) of fuel to CVW-11 twenty aircraft strike force from Carl Vinson.

During Operation Enduring Freedom in 2001, they became the first Viking squadron to be used in combat during the conflict. After completing their last deployment on USS Nimitz on 5 November 2003 which included taking part in Operation Iraqi Freedom, VS-29 held a decommissioning ceremony on 17 April 2004, before being finally decommissioned on 30 April 2004.
