= VS-38 =

United States Navy Anti-Submarine Warfare

Sea Control Squadron 38
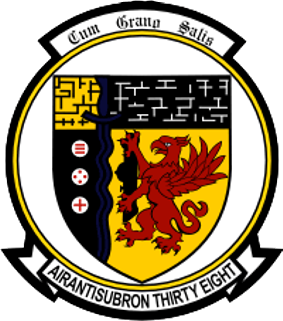
- Active: 20 July 1950 (as VS-892) - 30 April 2004
- Country: United States of America
- Branch: United States Navy
- Role: Anti-Submarine Warfare
- Garrison/HQ: NAS North Island
- Equipment: TBM-3S/W Avenger S-2 Tracker S-3A/B Viking
- Engagements: Cold War; Korean War; Vietnam War; Gulf War; Iraq War

Sea Control Squadron 38 or VS-38, nicknamed the "Red Griffins" was a former United States Navy Anti-Submarine Warfare and later Sea-Control squadron between 1950 and 2004. During its service life, they took part in the Korean War, Vietnam War, the 1991 Gulf War and the 2003 Invasion of Iraq.

== History ==
=== VS-892 (1950 - 1953) ===
VS-38 was originally VS-892, a Naval Reserve ASW squadron flying the Grumman TBM-3S and 3W Avenger that was commissioned on 20 July 1950, less than a month after the Invasion of South Korea by North Korea, starting the Korean War. The squadron was soon deployed to the war in 1951, flying from the Escort carriers, USS Sicily (CVE-118), USS Rendova (CVE-114), as well as USS Badoeng Strait (CVE-116). In 1952, the squadron moved to their current and last home at Naval Air Station North Island in San Diego.

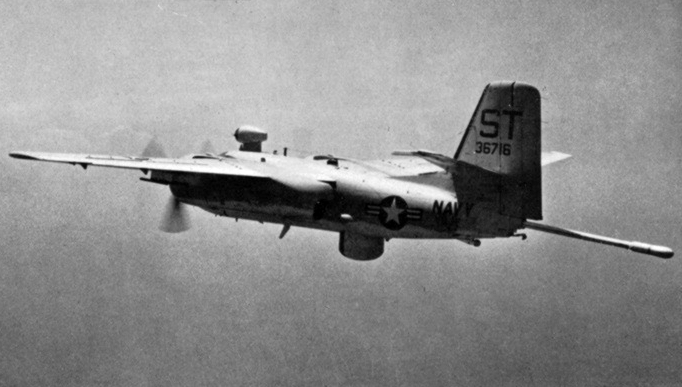
A Grumman S2F-1 Tracker (BuNo 136716) from VS-38 in flight in 1959.

=== Early years as VS-38 (1953 - 1963) ===
VS-892 was eventually renamed VS-38 Red Griffins on 4 February 1953 and deployed that year on the USS Point Cruz (CVE-119) on their last Korean War cruise. The Squadron then transitioned to Grumman S2F-1 Tracker in 1954 before making a West Pacific deployment the following year on the Badoeng Strait. In 1956, VS-38 became a larger squadron when it absorbed VS-25.

=== Vietnam War and Apollo Program (1964-1973) ===
On 20 February 1964, VS-38 deployed on board the USS Bennington (CVS-20) as part of CVSG-59. During this deployment which was made with the S-2E Tracker, the Vietnam War broke out and the squadron took part in operations ranging from flying shipping surveillance to Naval gunfire support missions. Between February 1965 and June 1969, they deployed eight more times on Bennington which included three more Vietnam War cruises and the recovery of Apollo 4 in 1967.

Between September 1969 and February 1970, VS-38 was reassigned to USS Hornet (CVS-12), making one East Pacific deployment. After this, they were reassigned to the USS Ticonderoga (CVS-14). In 1971, they made a deployment to the Indian Ocean before taking part in the Vietnam War in 1972, both times as embarked on Ticonderoga. Later that year, they received the final upgrade of the Tracker, the S-2G Tracker.

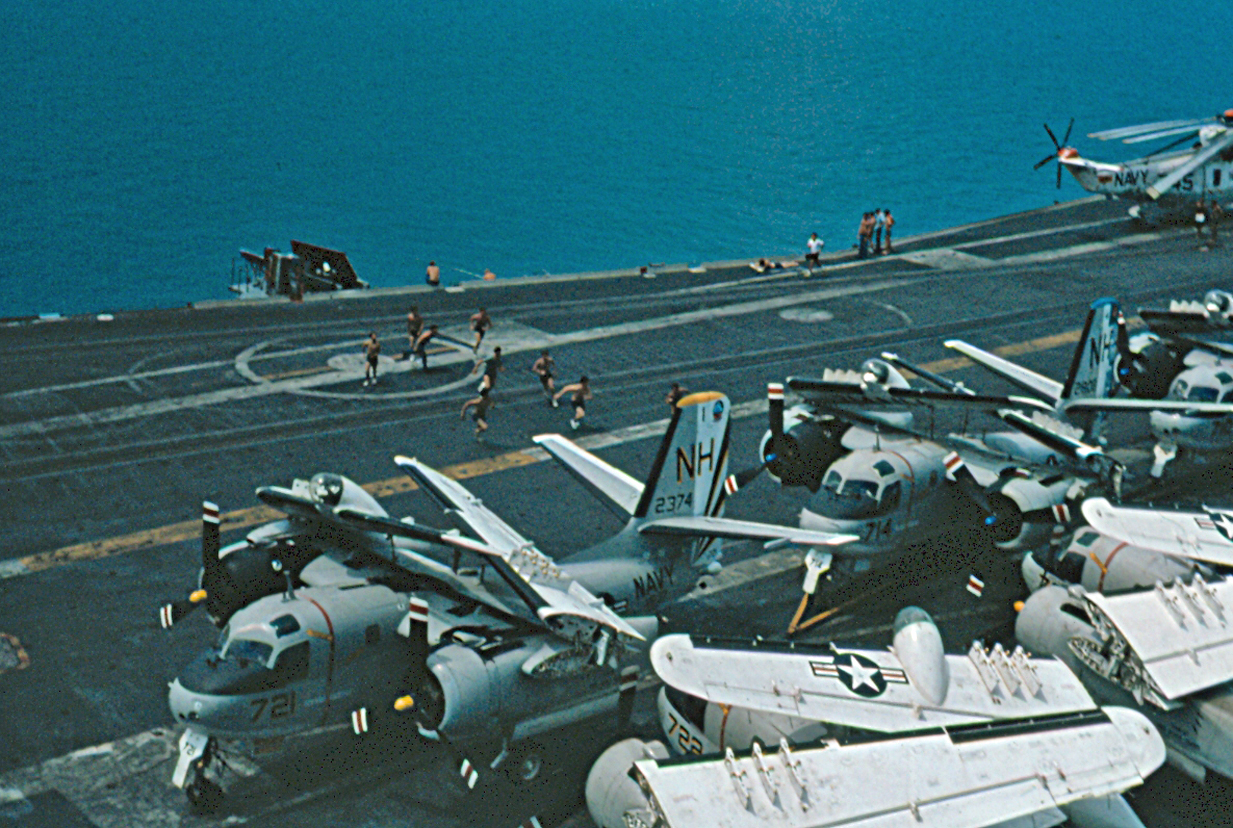
The USS Kitty Hawk CV-63 in Singapore harbour circa 1973/74. The S-2G to the left (NH-721) was assigned to anti-submarine squadron VS-37, the aircraft on the right (NH-714) to VS-38.

=== Integration into Attack Carrier Air Wings (1974 - 1985) ===
In 1973, VS-38 became Carrier Air Wing 11 (CVW-11)'s ASW asset after the CV concept was introduced integrating ASW units into Attack CVWs. On 23 November 1973, VS-38 and another ASW tracker squadron, VS-37 left as part of CVW-11 on the USS Kitty Hawk (CV-63) to the West Pacific on VS-38 and CVW-11's last Vietnam War cruise. Because of space restrictions, not all of CVW-11's assigned 116 aircraft could deploy, leaving VS-33 which also the S-2G and HS-8 which flew the SH-3D Sea King to stay behind. The 1,000th landing conducted during the cruise on 31 December 1973 was also made by VS-38. During the next two cruises, VS-38 was nicknamed 'Clan Clan', a title that would stick until the squadron transitioned to the Viking, changing back to the Red Griffins.

After another deployment in the West Pacific on the Kitty Hawk in 1975, the squadron retired the S-2G Tracker and beginning the transition to the newer jet powered Lockheed S-3A Viking. Between 4 April and 30 October 1978, VS-38 made a deployment on USS Enterprise (CVN-65) as part of CVW-14 which included operating the US-3A COD (Carrier On-board Delivery) Viking. This followed by two cruises on the USS Constellation (CV-64) as part of CVW-9 in 1980 and between late 1981 and early 1982.

Between 13 January and 1 August 1984, VS-38 deployed again on the Kitty Hawk as part of CVW-2 on a West Pacific and Indian Ocean deployment. During this cruise however, Kitty Hawk would collide with the Soviet Victor I Class Submarine K-314 during Exercise Team-Spirit 84-1. On 13 July, NE-703, an S-3A from VS-38 took part in a Search and Rescue mission which ended in the rescue of a crew member from the USS Berkeley (DDG-15).

=== The Grumman Air Wing and 1991 Gulf War (1986 - 1993) ===
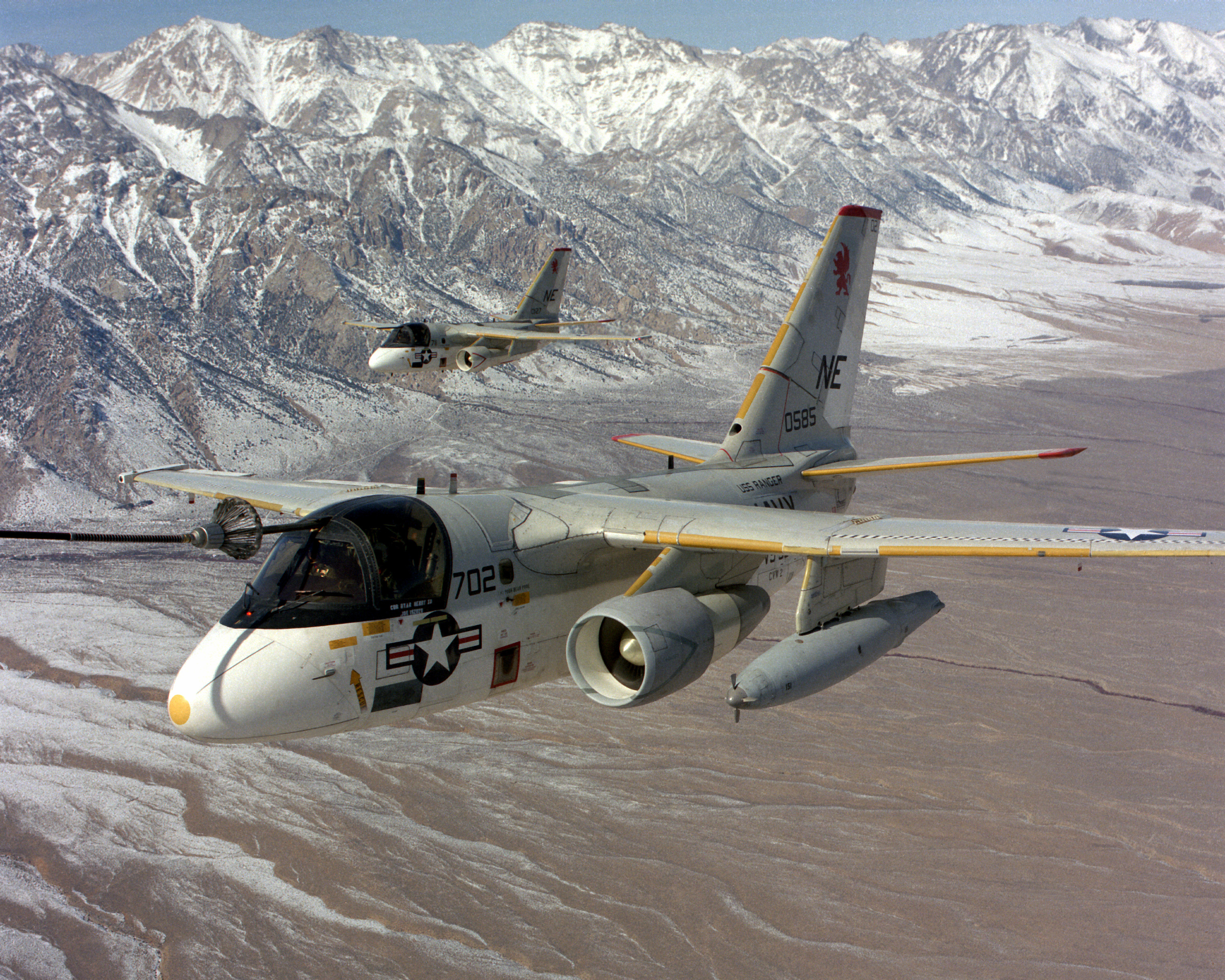
VS-38 S-3A refueling over the Sierra Nevada mountains in 1989

In 1986, VS-38 and CVW-2 deployed on what would be the first of many deployments on the USS Ranger (CV-61). During these deployments, CVW-2 became dubbed 'The Grumman Air Wing' due to absence of other non-Grumman aircraft besides the S-3 Viking and the Sea King ASW Helicopter (the LTV A-7E Corsair II and the McDonnell Douglas F/A-18A Hornet), instead having another Grumman A-6E TRAM Intruder squadron. During these years, VS-38 deployed in the late 80s as part of Operation Earnest Will (the protection of US Shipping during the Iran-Iraq War).

After Kuwait was invaded on 2 August 1990, Ranger, CVW-2 and VS-38 deployed to the Persian Gulf before taking part in Operation Desert Storm between 17 January and 28 February 1991. During this time, they became the first S-3 Viking squadron to fire the ADM-141 TALD decoy in combat on 18 January 1991. After the end of the war, they returned to the United States on 8 June 1991. In 1993, VS-38 became the last US Navy squadron to retire the S-3A Viking after 17 years of service since 1976 in the US Navy. This came after the last deployment for the Grumman Air Wing structure and the USS Ranger which ended on 31 January 1993. During the cruise, they were also the first ASW carrier based squadron to conduct ASW operations in the Persian Gulf as well as becoming the first to track and locate Iran's first Kilo Class Submarine. After this cruise, the squadron transitioned to the S-3B Viking with CVW-2 for the USS Constellation's transit from the Atlantic and around Cape Horn to the Pacific Fleet between May and July 1993. In October 1993, the Navy renamed the squadron from Anti-Submarine Warfare Squadron 38 to Sea Control Squadron 38 in light of the expanded mission of the S-3B Viking in the 1990s.

=== Final Years (1994 - 2004) ===
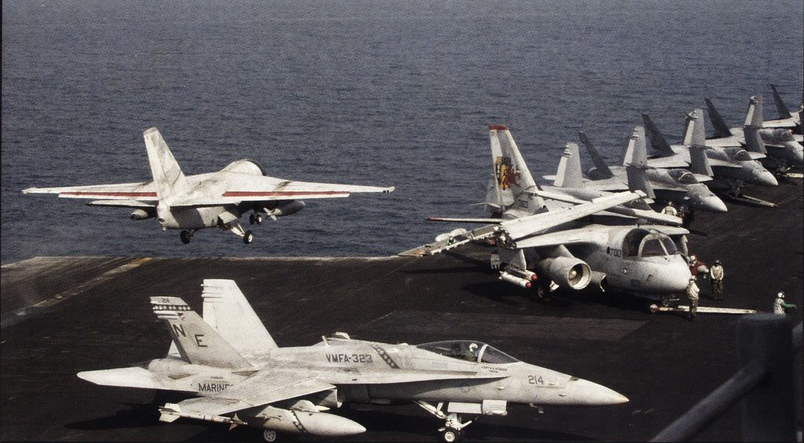
An S-3B Viking from VS-38 taking off in 2001 off the USS Constellation CV-64.

VS-38 conducted another deployment on the Constellation in mid 1994, taking part in the RIMPAC '94 exercise which also included the forward deployed carrier USS Independence (CV-62). On 10 November 1994, the squadron deployed with Constellation on their first proper deployment in two years, heading through the West Pacific, Indian Ocean and the Persian Gulf. Two more deployments to the Persian Gulf followed in 1997 and 1999. At the end of the 1999 cruise in December while in Hawaii, 6 of their S-3Bs were handed over to VS-21 which was part of CVW-5 on the Kitty Hawk.

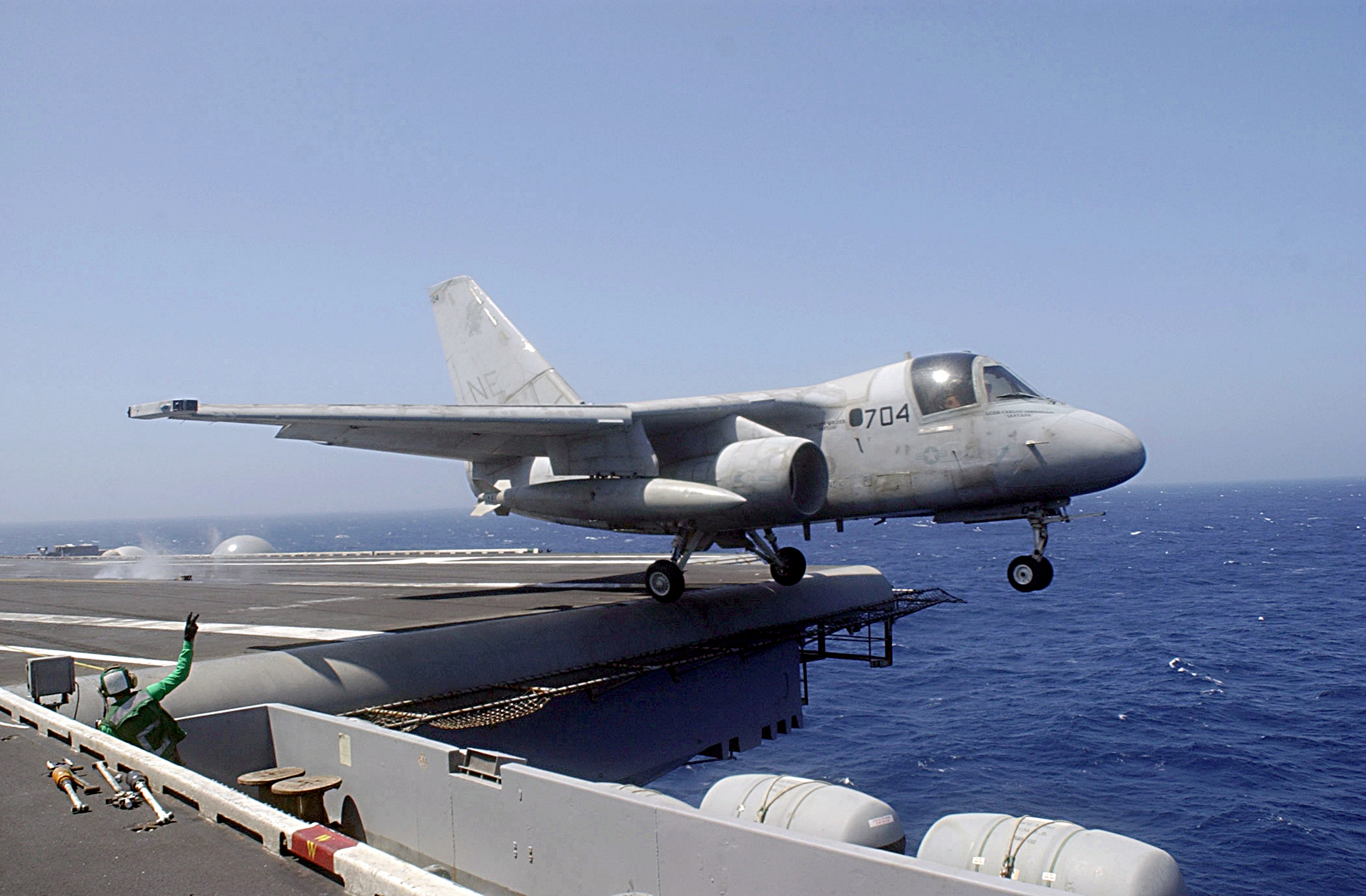
The last take off from the USS Constellation performed by NE-704 of VS-38.

As VS-38 was returning from another deployment in 2001, the September 11 terrorist attacks occurred in New York. The decision was however made to allow Constellation, CVW-2 and VS-38 to finish their deployment as expected. In November 2002, VS-38 set off on another deployment to Persian Gulf. During this cruise however, peace would soon become war as Operation Iraqi Freedom started in March 2003 with VS-38 and the rest of CVW-2 on the Constellation playing an active role. This included VS-38 attacking a naval target in Iraqi territory using an AGM-65 Maverick. Before arriving back to the States, VS-38 became the last squadron to perform a landing and a take off on the Constellation as the ship was to be retired. This would however be VS-38's last carrier landing and take off as this was their final deployment. Due to CVW-2 receiving the F/A-18F Super Hornet (which was capable of doing the aerial tanker role of the S-3 Viking) for VFA-2 Bounty Hunters, the decision was made to disestablish the squadron. Finally on 30 April 2004, VS-38 was decommissioned at NAS North Island.
