= VS-21 =

Sea Control Squadron 21 (VS-21)
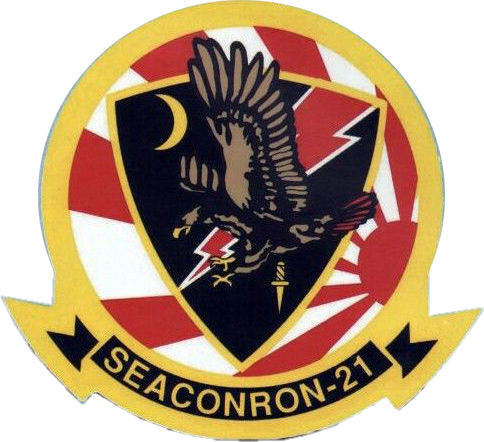
- Active: 26 March 1945 – 28 February 2005
- Country: United States
- Branch: United States Navy
- Role: Anti-submarine warfare
- Size: squadron
- Nickname: Fighting Red Tails
- Equipment: TBM-3 Avenger; S-2 Tracker; S-3 Viking
- Engagements: Korean War; Vietnam War; Operation Earnest Will; Operation Praying Mantis; Operation Southern Watch; 1996 Taiwan Strait Crisis; Operation Enduring Freedom; Operation Iraqi Freedom

Insignia
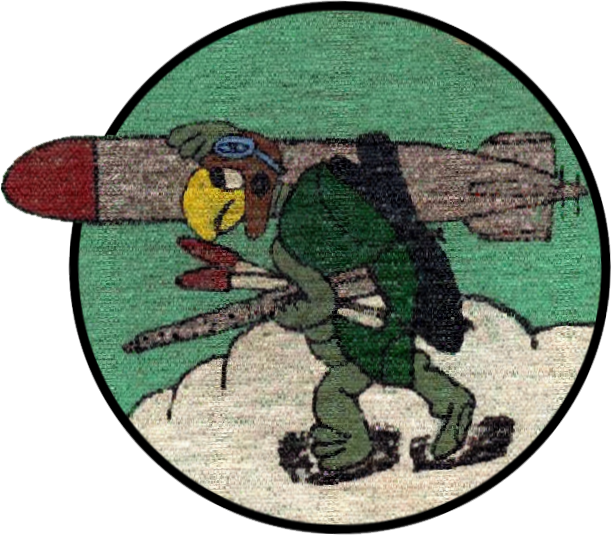
- VT-41

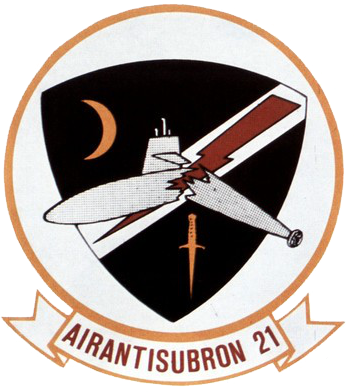
- VS-21 (1955)

Sea Control Squadron 21 (VS-21) was an aviation unit of the United States Navy. It served from 1945 to 2005 and was mainly tasked with anti-submarine warfare while operating from aircraft carriers. It was the only squadron to receive the designations VA-1E, VC-21, or VS-21.

== History ==
=== World War II ===
The squadron originally as VT-41 established in the final year of World War II, and served after the war aboard USS Badoeng Strait CVE-116 helping to develop hunter-killer ASW tactics for the U.S. Navy, and ultimately operated from full-size aircraft carriers in the sea control role, capable of anti-submarine and anti-surface warfare.

=== Late 1940s ===
The squadron was established as VT-41 at Naval Air Station Seattle, Washington (USA), under the command of LT. Joseph P. Keigher, with the General Motors-built TBM-1, TBM-1C, and TBM-3 Avenger torpedo bomber as part of CVEG-41. Commander Air Force Pacific Fleet had designated the squadron upon formation as having anti-submarine warfare as its primary mission.

On 15 November 1946, as part of a service-wide reorganization, VT-41 was redesignated VA-1E, while CVEG-41 was simultaneously redesignated CVEG-1. The group, which consisted of VA-1E and fighter squadron VF-1E, was assigned on 4 December 1946, on the Badoeng Strait. VA-1E was identified by the tail code "BS" (call sign "Beef Steak").

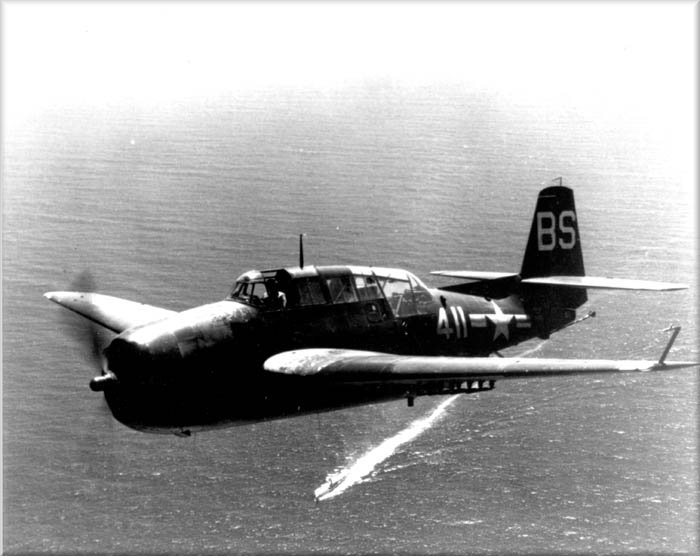
A TBM-3S in VA-1E colors

In 1947–1948, VA-1E conducted regular ASW exercises aboard Badoeng Strait between the U.S. West Coast and the Western Pacific. The squadron saw extensive service in ASW trials and tactics development aboard Badoeng Strait.

When the US Navy turned back to the designation system used before November 1946, both CVEG-1 squadrons VA-1E and VF-1E were merged into Composite Squadron 21 (VC-21) on 1 September 1948, creating one of six new anti-submarine squadrons.

=== 1950s ===
VC-21 was redesignated VS-21 (Air Anti-Submarine Squadron 21) on 23 April 1950. The squadron became the first US Navy ASW Squadron to depart from the US on a deployment in response to the Korean War on 4 July that year on board the USS Sicily CVE-118. During the cruise, they were responsible for the evacuation of wounded US Marine service members from Koto-ri Airfield during the Battle of Chosin Reservoir.

On 3 December, the squadron transferred during the deployment to the USS Bairoko CVE-115, moving from the TBM-3E to the TBM-3S ASW aircraft before returning on 16 February 1951. Another Korean War deployment with the Bairoko took place between 3 February and 8 May 1953. This was VS-21's first deployment the Grumman AF-2S/2W Guardian.

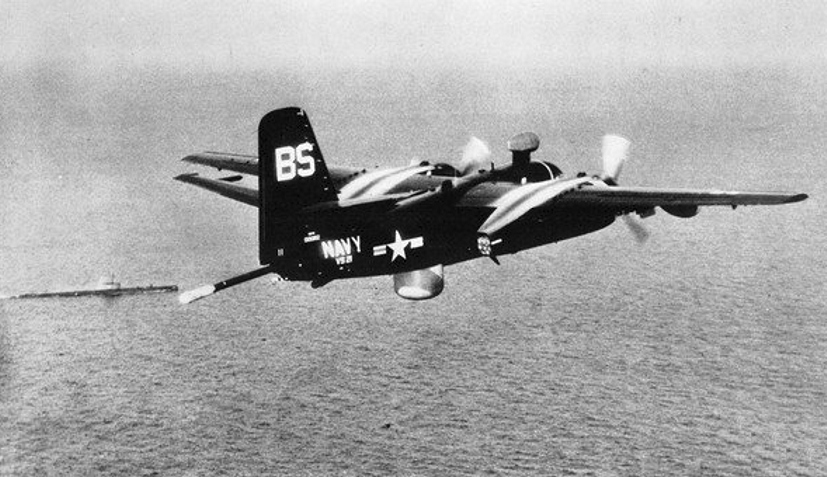
A squadron S2F-2 in flight

In December 1954, VS-21 began to operate the Grumman S2F-1 Tracker. In 1955, the squadron began to display the red lightning bolt on their engine and later tailfins of their aircraft. The following year, the squadron made deployment to the West Pacific and Indian Ocean on board the USS Princeton CV-37, becoming the first Pacific Fleet VS squadron to win the Battle E award. This was followed by deployment in 1958 on board the Philippine Sea and in late 1959 to early 1960 on the Kearsarge, both of these with addition of the S2F-2 variant for the first time.

=== 1960s ===
After returning from its 1959 deployment, in April 1960, the squadron was split in two, with one half continuing as VS-21 while the other half became VS-29. Both VS-21 and VS-29 along with the Helicopter ASW squadron HS-6 were assigned to CVSG-53, embarking on the air group's first cruise in 1961 with the Kearsarge. Another deployment in 1962 took the squadron to the Pacific Missile Range, deploying the S2F-1 and 1S and 1S1 aircraft. During this cruise, the squadron supported the recovery of Mercury-Atlas 8 on 3 October 1962.

After another deployment in 1963, VS-21 and the Kearsarge left what was to become a major Westpac deployment on 19 June 1964. On 5 August 1964, while carrier was inport at Yokosuka, Japan; the ship was ordered to provide ASW protection for US Navy Attack Carriers in the South China Sea near North Vietnam, as a result of the Gulf of Tonkin Incident. By that afternoon, VS-21 and the rest of CVSG-53, which had been temporarily based at NAF Atsugi; had returned to the carrier. In 1965, the squadron transferred to the S-2E Tracker and became the first VS squadron to operationally employ the AGM-12 Bullpup. Three more deployments to the Vietnam War in 1966, 1968 and 1969 also took place, all as part of CVSG-53, operating on board the Kearsage.

=== 1970s ===
In 1971, VS-21 was reassigned to the USS Saratoga CV-60 to validate the ability to operate ASW units with an Attack Carrier (the CV Concept). This test was deemed successful and as a result, the Attack Carriers (CVA) became Carriers (CV). VS-21 made its last deployment with CVSG-53 and its last Vietnam War deployment between 17 May and 29 July 1972.

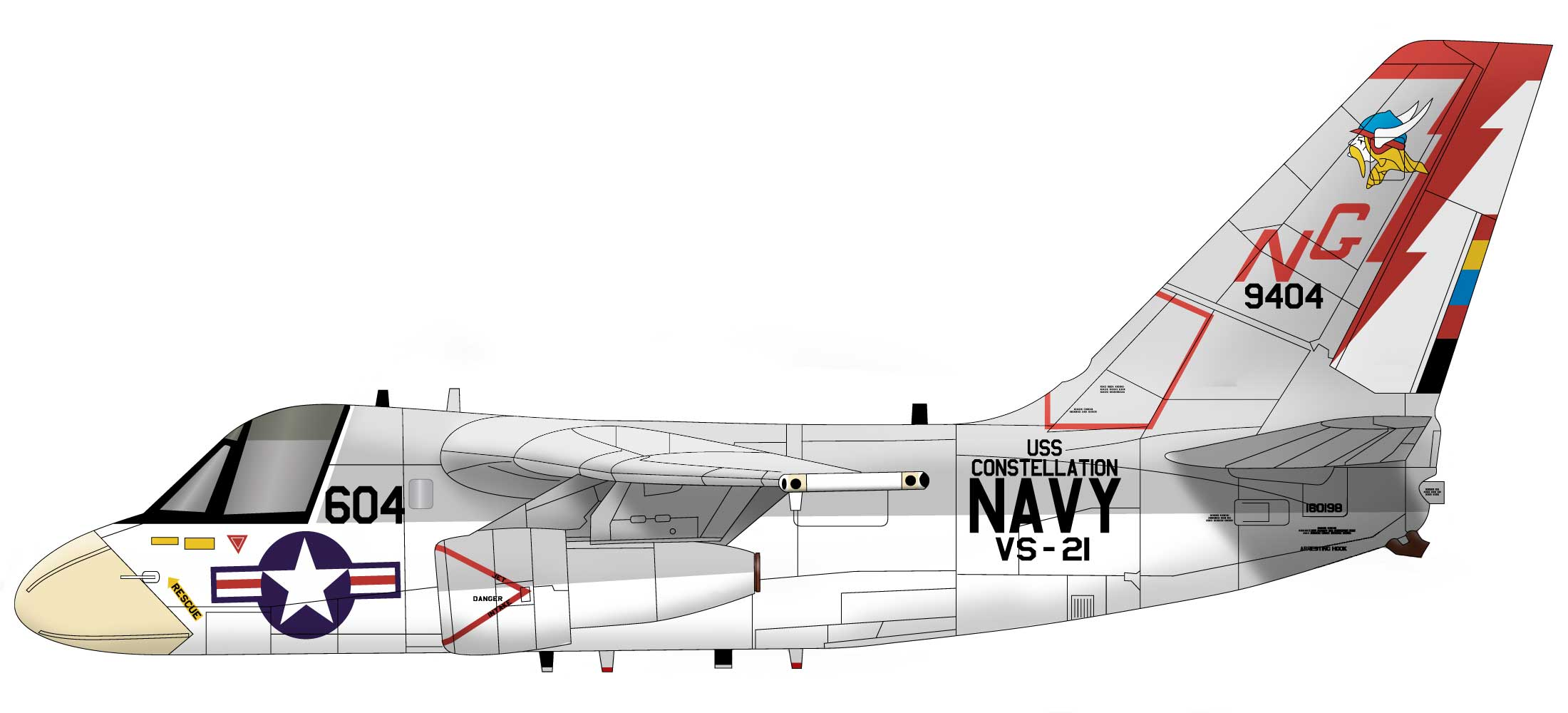
Profile of an S-3A during the squadron's service aboard the USS Constellation

1974 saw the squadron being selected to become the first squadron in the US Navy to operate the Lockheed S-3A Viking. That same year, the squadron changed its name from the Lightning Bolts to the Fighting Red Tails. Between 28 June 1975 and 27 January 1976, VS-21 made the first S-3 Viking deployment as part of CVW-1 assigned to the USS John F Kennedy CV-67, sailing to the Mediterranean Sea. The squadron also won a Battle E award as well as a CNO Safety Award CAPT. Arnold J. Isbell Trophy for ASW excellence in 1975.

After being reassigned to CVW-9 and the USS Constellation CV-64, the squadron deployed on 12 April 1977 to the West Pacific, returning on 21 November. On 30 May 1979, VS-21 deployed with CVW-15 aboard the USS Kitty Hawk CV-63 with the addition of the US-3A Viking COD aircraft, returning on 25 February 1980.

=== 1980s ===
VS-21 made one operational deployment with the USS Ranger CV-61 between 7 April and 18 October 1982 before being reassigned to CVW-11. Beginning in May 1984, VS-21 made five operation cruises with CVW-11 between 1984 and 1990 on board the USS Enterprise CVN-65, including a 1986 World Cruise through the Suez Canal and taking part in Operation Earnest Will.

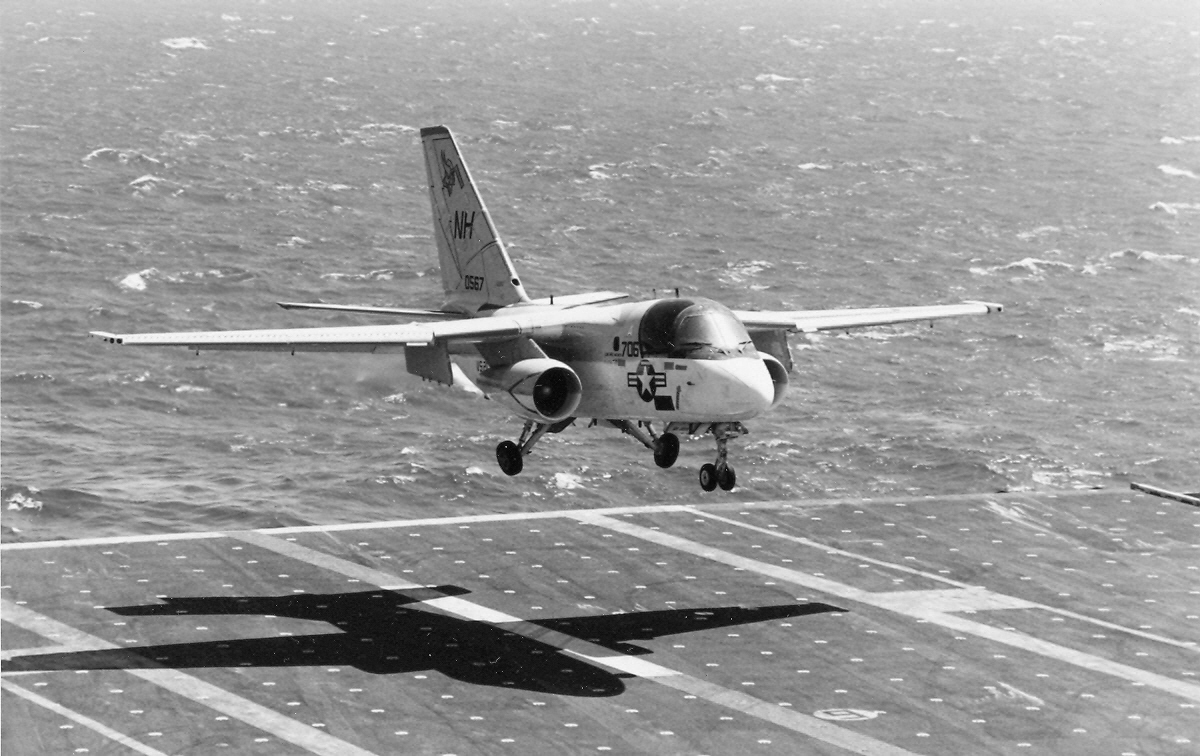
NH706, an S-3A Viking assigned to VS-21 landing on board the Enterprise in August 1988.

After leaving for another cruise on 5 January 1988, VS-21 and her air wing replaced the USS Midway and her air wing on 14–15 February before arriving in the Persian Gulf for Earnest Will on 18 February. Between 18 February and 10 March and then from 19 March and 22 May, VS-21 and CVW-11 conducted operations in the Persian Gulf which included taking part in a supporting role during Operation Praying Mantis on 18 April. During their transit to British Hong Kong, on 5–6 June, one of their S-3A Vikings during takeoff rolled to left and crashed into the sea. Despite ejecting, three of the four crew on board perished, including VS-21's CO. VS-21 returned to the States on 1 July 1988.

VS-21, CVW-11 and the Enterprise left NAS Alameda for a World Cruise on 25 July 1989. After taking part in PACEX '89 with the Carl Vinson and Constellation Battlegroups, VS-21 took part in several war games in the Sea of Japan, Western Pacific and off Okinawa with 48 vessels including the Carl Vinson, the Battleships USS New Jersey BB-62 and USS Missouri BB-64 as well as several vessels of the JMSDF.

More exercises with the Carl Vinson and her air wing occurred with VS-21 and CVW-11 while in coordination with the ROK Armed Forces off South Korea between 18 and 28 October. After making port calls in British Hong Kong and Subic Bay as well as avoiding Typhoon Hunt in late November, VS-21 and Enterprise's Battlegroup conducted operations with Midway Battlegroup as part of Operation Classic Resolve during the 1989 Philippines coup attempt. The final operations for VS-21 in 1989 brought them to Singapore as well taking part in war games with the Royal Malaysian Navy

=== 1990s ===
On 27 January 1990, NH704, one of VS-21's S-3As; had to divert to RAFO Masirah due to partial loss of flight control movement. The aircraft later returned to Enterprise on 31 January. After conducting anti-drug interdiction operations with the air wing's E-2Cs on 2 March, Enterprise and arrived at Norfolk, Virginia, on 17 May 1990 before VS-21 and CVW-11 returned to bases between 24 and 29 May. Around December 1990, VS-21 began receiving the S-3B Viking with the tailcode of CVW-5, the air wing they would move to 1991.

Temporarily assigned to CVW-14, VS-21 departed with the USS Independence CV-62 on 5 August 1991 from NAS North Island. Arriving at Pearl Harbor on 22 August, most of CVW-14's squadrons including VS-21 were officially reassigned to CVW-5, while some of CVW-14 and CVW-5 moved to the older Midway as it got replaced. VS-21, CVW-5 and the Independence then departed Pearl Harbor for US Fleet Activities Yokosuka on 28 August 1991, arriving in Japan on 11 September. VS-21's first operation deployment with CVW-5 occurred between 15 and 24 October November 1991, largely occurring in the Western Pacific and the Sea of Japan.

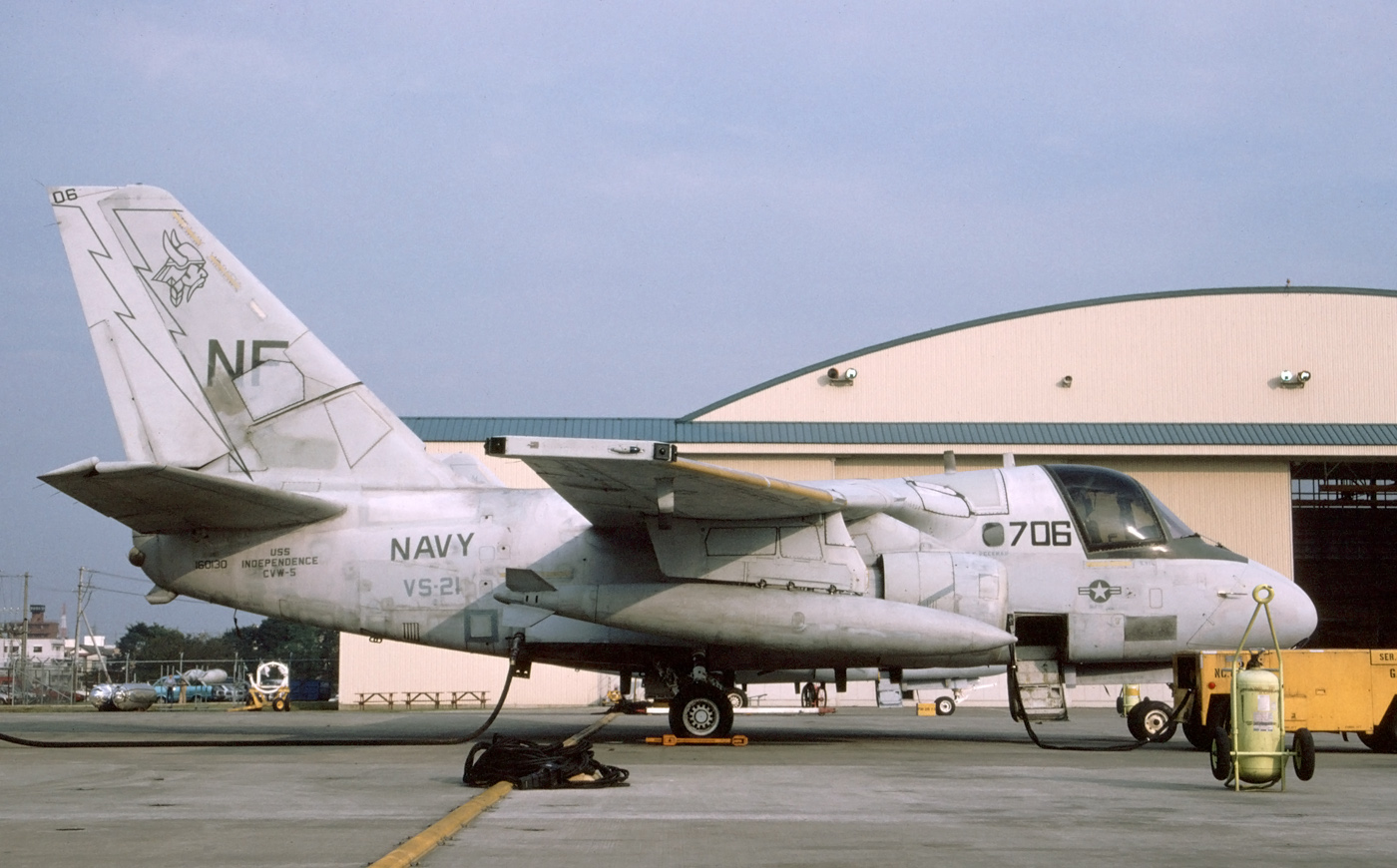
An S-3B Viking of VS-21 at NAF Atsugi in November 1994.

VS-21's first Persian Gulf deployment since 1990 began on 15 April 1992, arriving in the region on 10 August. They became the first US Navy VS squadron to take part in Operation Southern Watch when the Independence and her air wing were assigned to begin the No-Fly Zone over Southern Iraq on 26 August 1992. VS-21 and the Independence were relieved by the Ranger Battlegroup on 14 September 1992, before returning to Japan on 13 October 1992.

Between February and July 1993, VS-21 conducted two short deployments in the Western Pacific and the Sea of Japan. On 1 October 1993, the squadron was redesignated Sea Control Squadron 21 (retaining the abbreviated form VS-21). VS-21 made another deployment to Persian Gulf as part of Southern Watch between 17 November 1993 and 17 March 1994, followed by taking part in RIMPAC 1994 during June to July 1994.

During March 1996, VS-21 along with CVW-5 and the Independence took part in contingency operations as the Republic of China (Taiwan) held its first democratic elections during the 1996 Taiwan Strait Crisis.

After two more deployments (including one to the Persian Gulf in 1998), in July 1998; VS-21 and the Independence transited to Pearl Harbor to conduct another Carrier swap, arriving on 17 July 1998. VS-21 and CVW-5 moved to the USS Kitty Hawk CV-63 and departed on 24 July from Hawaii before arriving back in Japan on 11 August. VS-21 and the Kitty Hawk deployed to the Persian Gulf between March and August 1999 as well as taking part in a Westpac deployment between October and November that same year. That same year, VS-21 received newer Vikings from several squadrons including one from VS-29 (April 1999), two from VS-41 (September 1999) and 5 from VS-38 (which VS-21 swapped all of its older aircraft with in Hawaii during November 1999).

=== 2000s ===
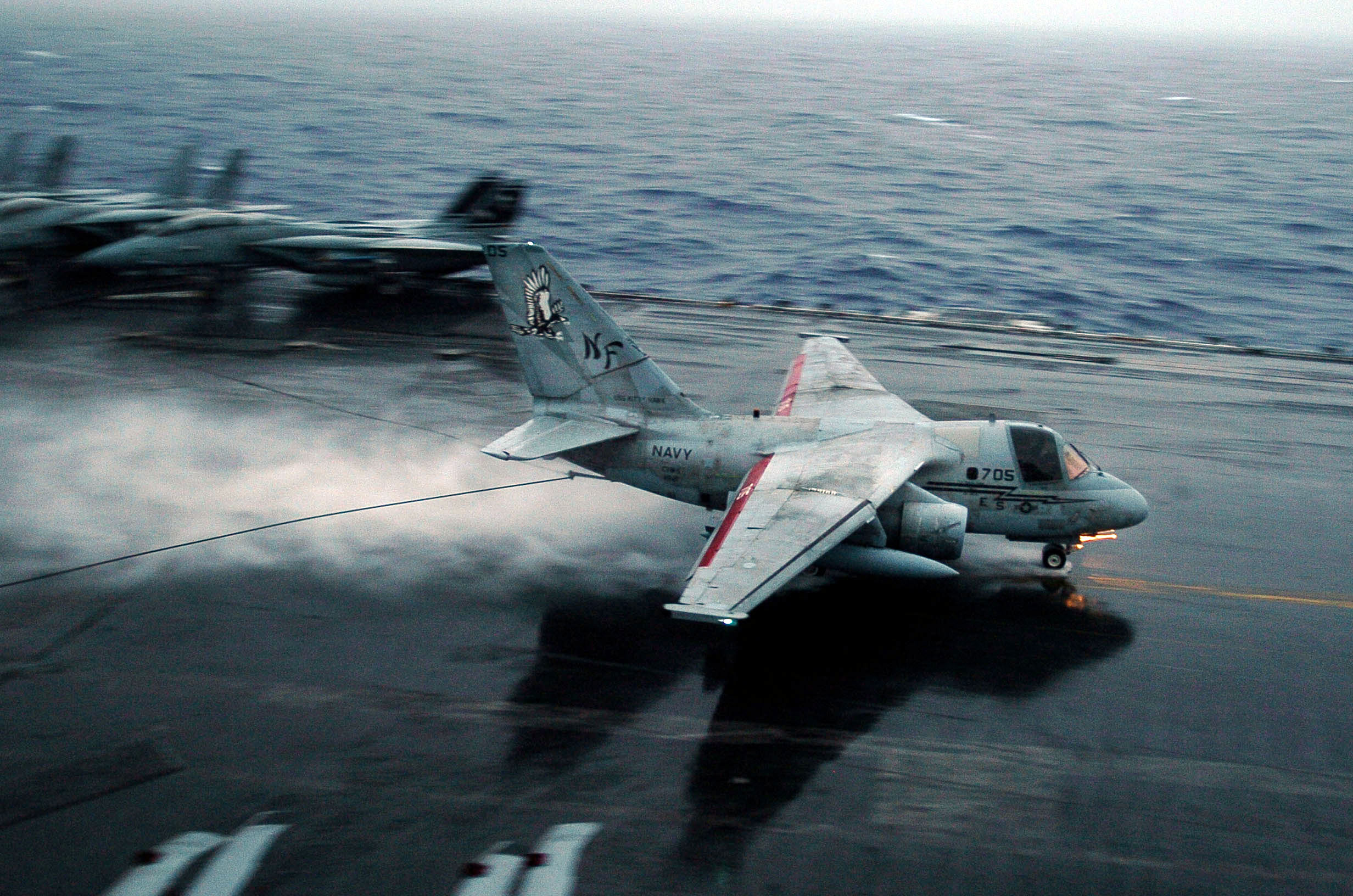
An S-3B from VS-21 lands on board the USS John C. Stennis CVN-74 on October 14, 2004, during the latter's transit through the Western Pacific.

VS-21 conducted its first two deployments of the 2000s between April and November 2000 in the Western Pacific and the Sea of Japan. Another Westpac deployment also took place between March and June 2001. VS-21 also assigned several of three of their aircraft to CVW-5 Detachment A as part of Operation Enduring Freedom between 1 October and 23 December 2001. VS-21 made two more deployments in 2002.

On 23 January 2003, VS-21 and the Kitty Hawk Battlegroup deployed to take part in Operations of the coast of North Korea due to the latter's nuclear and military developments in light of the positioning of US forces near Iraq. VS-21 and the carrier then transited to the Persian Gulf for their last Southern Watch deployment. Starting on 19 March, the squadron took part in Operation Iraqi Freedom, before finishing operations in the Gulf on 23 April, arriving back in Japan on 6 May 2003.

VS-21 made three more deployments during 2003 and 2004 which included its last deployment with the Kitty Hawk's Air Wing as it took part in Summer Pulse 2004 between 19 July and 7 September 2004. The squadron was finally disestablished on 28 February 2005.

== Aircraft assignment ==
- TBM-1 Avenger from March 1945
- TBM-1C Avenger from March 1945
- TBM-3 Avenger from March 1945
- TBF-1 Avenger from April 1945
- TBM-3E Avenger from May 1945
- TBM-3S Avenger from 1948
- AF-2 Guardian
- S2F-1 Tracker
- S2F-2 Tracker
- S-2E Tracker
- S-3A Viking
- S-3B Viking

== See also ==
- History of the United States Navy
- List of inactive United States Navy aircraft squadrons
- List of United States Navy aircraft squadrons
