= VAQ-136 =

Electronic Attack Squadron 136
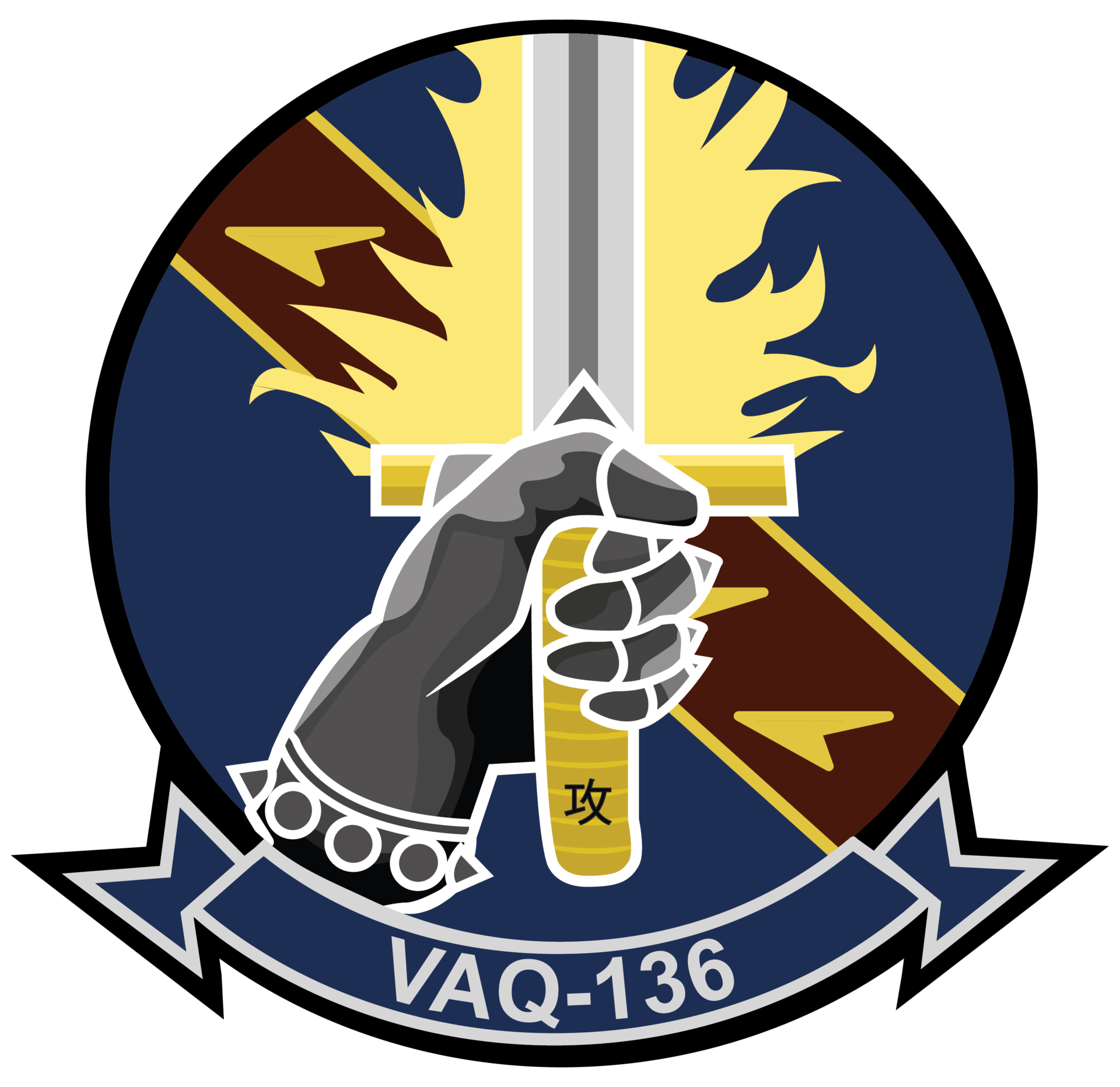
- Active: 6 April 1973 - Present (52 years, 5 months)
- Country: United States
- Branch: United States Navy
- Type: Electronic Attack
- Role: Electronic Warfare
- Part of: Carrier Air Wing Two
- Garrison/HQ: NAS Whidbey Island
- Nickname(s): Gauntlets
- Motto(s): "Lac Pecuniam"
- Colors: #192e54 #e1c437 #461b12
- Engagements: Operation Desert Shield; Operation Desert Storm; Operation Provide Promise; Operation Southern Watch; Operation Deny Flight; Operation Deliberate Force; Operation Deliberate Guard; Operation Desert Fox; Operation Iraqi Freedom; Operation Majestic Eagle; Operation Enduring Freedom; Operation New Dawn; Operation Inherent Resolve; Operation Prosperity Guardian; Operation Poseidon Archer
- Decorations: Safety "S" (3); Battle "E" (5); Admiral Arthur W. Radford Award (2); Prowler Squadron of the Year Award (3); Association of Old Crows- Outstanding Unit Award
- Website: https://www.airpac.navy.mil/Organization/Electronic-Attack-Squadron-VAQ-136/

Commanders
- Commanding Officer: CDR. Paul C. Ritter
- Executive Officer: CDR. William Bogdanowicz
- Command Master Chief: CMDCM. Jason P. Degraaf

Insignia
- Callsign: IRONCLAW
- Modex: 5XX
- Tail Code: NE

Aircraft flown
- Electronic warfare: EA-6B Prowler(1973-2013); EA-18G Growler(2013-Present)

Electronic Attack Squadron 136 (VAQ-136) "Gauntlets" is a United States Navy Electronic attack squadron flying the EA-18G Growler and is currently attached to Carrier Air Wing Two, deploy aboard the aircraft carrier USS Carl Vinson a composite unit made up of a wide array of aircraft performing a variety of combat and support missions including F2T2EA. The squadron is currently stationed at Naval Air Station Whidbey Island.

== History ==
=== 1970s ===
Since establishment in 1969, VAQ-136 has been associated with several Carrier Air Wings. The squadron's first two deployments were with CVW-11 aboard USS Kitty Hawk. In 1977 the squadron joined CVW-7 aboard USS Independence for a cruise to the Mediterranean, after which the squadron changed to the Improved Capability (ICAP) version of the EA-6B. After the transition to their new aircraft, the squadron deployed to the Mediterranean again, this time with CVW-7 on USS Independence.

=== 1980s ===
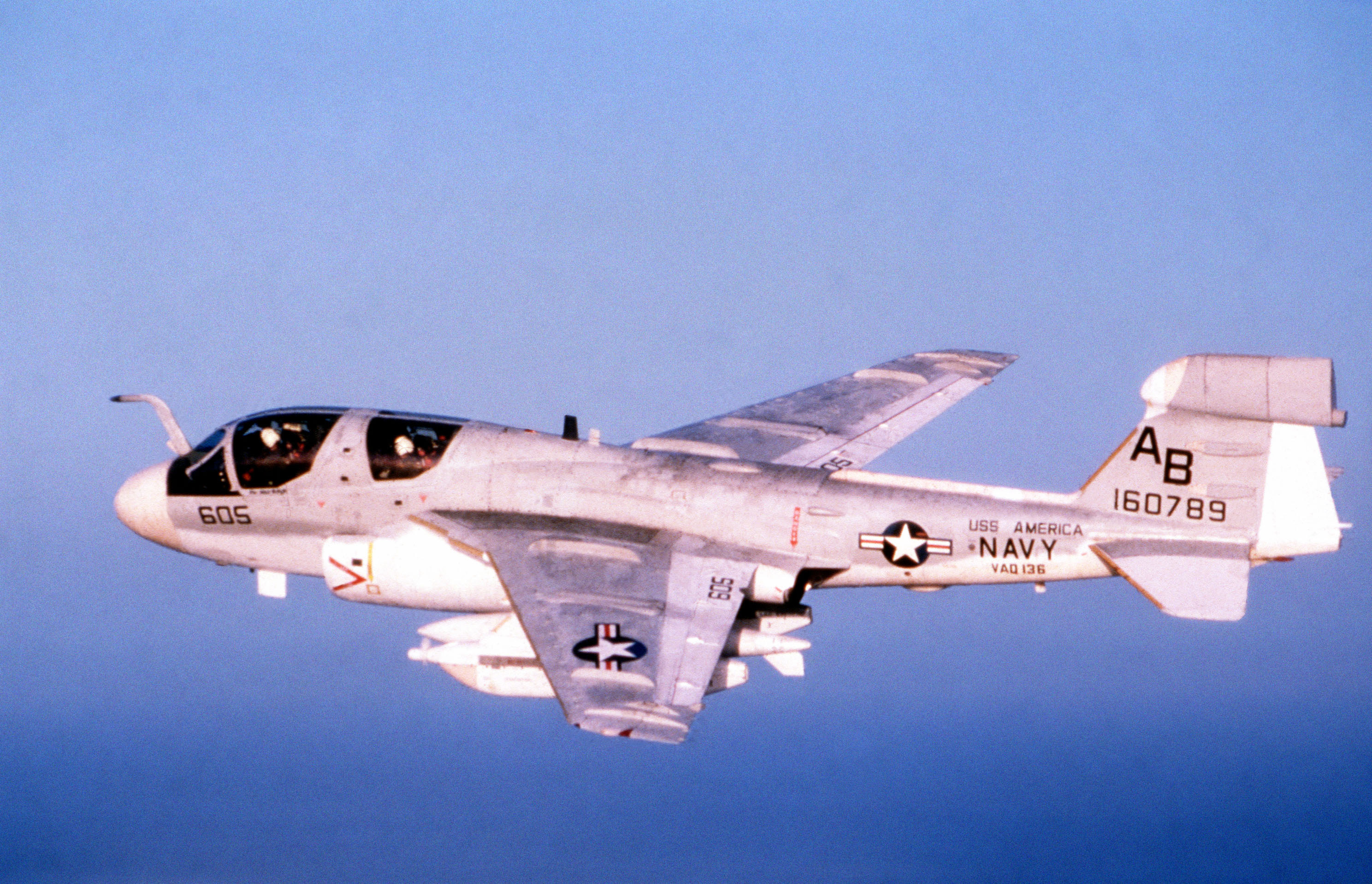
VAQ-136 Northrop Grumman EA-6B Prowler in 1982

In 1980 the squadron flew across the Pacific Ocean to their new home in NAF Atsugi, Japan with Carrier Air Wing Five and USS Midway, based at Yokosuka. The squadron conducted an 8300 mile cross-deck deployment to USS America in support of Indian Ocean operations in 1983, and a record-setting 111 day Indian Ocean at sea period (101 days out of sight of land) in 1984. In 1987 the Commanding Officer of 136 and his three junior officers Lt John Carter (pilot), LT Doug Hora and LT Dave Gibson went missing during a routine night EMCON flight in the Indian Ocean. Commander Justin Greene was on the verge of completing his 1,000th carrier arrestment, his celebration cake was given a respectful deposit at sea uneaten. The plane and officers have never been found. The eulogy during USS Midway's memorial service was delivered by Navy Lieutenant Daniel Shanower who later died (Captain US Navy) on 11 September 2001 at the Pentagon. In 1986, the squadron transitioned to ICAP II aircraft and deployed to support the 1988 Summer Olympics in Seoul, Korea. The squadron was awarded the COMNAVAIRPAC Battle Efficiency "E", and the Safety "S" in 1989.

=== 1990s ===
On 16 April 1990, as part of the Cope Thunder exercise, the squadron successfully fired a live AGM-88 HARM missile at a U.S. Air Force target radar off the coast of the Philippines. It was the first AGM-88 fired in WESTPAC and the missile completely destroyed its target.

On 17 January 1991 the squadron flew strikes against Iraq in support of Operation Desert Storm. During the 43-day war, the squadron fired 28 AGM-88s against Iraqi air defenses, ensuring that CVW-5 did not lose any aircraft to enemy fire.

On 22 August 1991, the squadron cross-decked from USS Midway with CVW-5 to USS Independence at Naval Base Pearl Harbor, Hawaii. During this transfer it received several new EA-6Bs, including BuNo 163045 which would be later on be involved in a cable car accident in 1998. In early 1992, the squadron deployed with USS Independence in support of Operation Southern Watch. The squadron received the Pacific Fleet Battle Efficiency "E" award for 1992, the Radford Award for being the best EA-6B squadron in the Navy, the Association of Old Crows Outstanding Unit Award, and a Meritorious Unit Commendation.

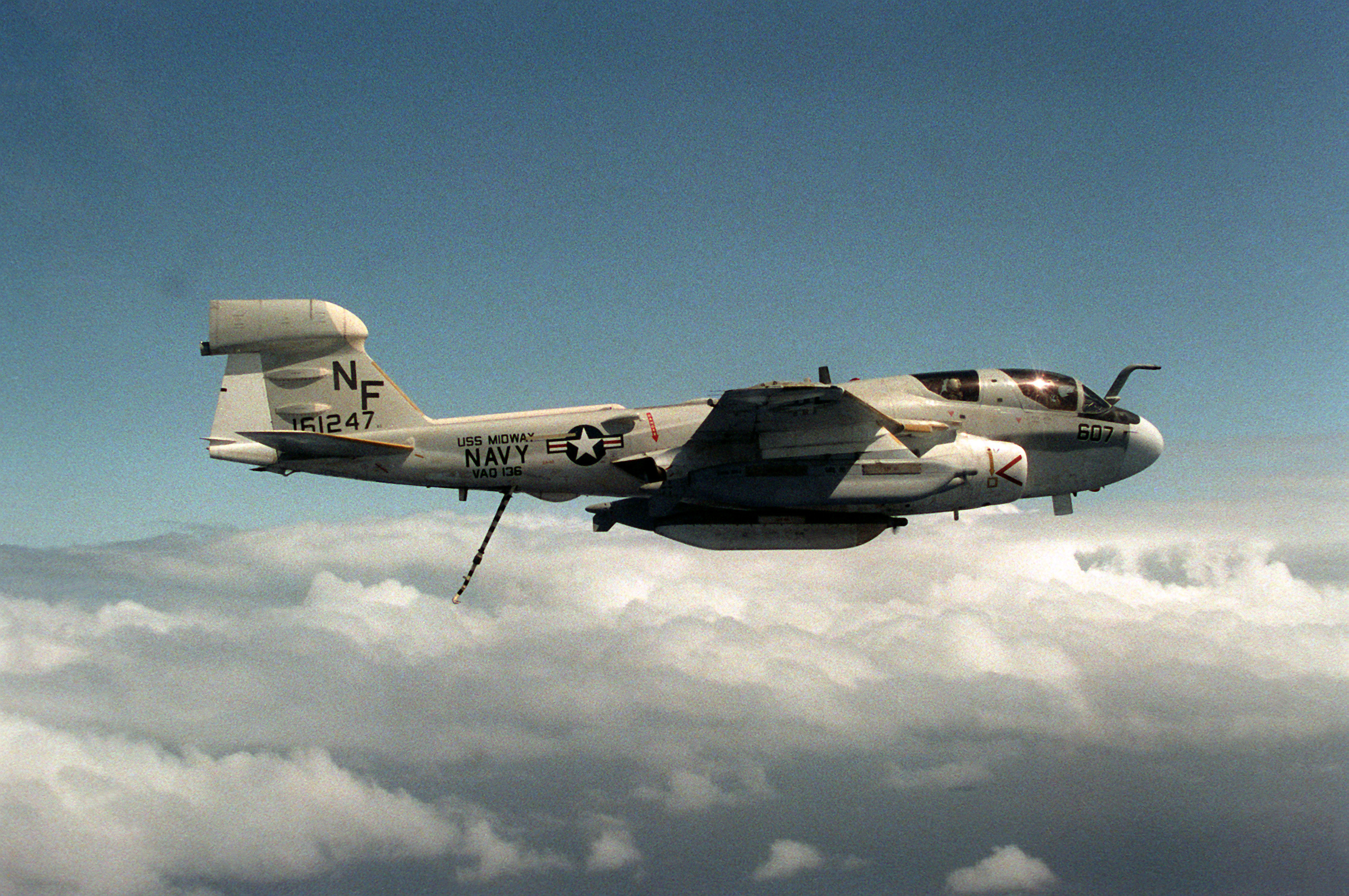
VAQ-136 EA-6B in 1993

In 1993 the squadron sailed to the Persian Gulf in support of Operation Southern Watch. That summer saw the squadron supporting U.S. policy during intense North Korean Contingency Operations. VAQ-136 was named the "Prowler Squadron of the Year for Tactical Excellence" for 1994.

The squadron began 1995 with operations in the Yellow Sea before proceeding south to participate in Exercise Cobra Gold off the coast of Thailand. They then moved to the Middle East yet again participating in Operation Southern Watch. The squadron were awarded the COMNAVAIRPAC Battle Efficiency "E", and Safety "S" for 1995.

In 1996 VAQ-136 operated in the Yellow Sea, near the Philippines, and around Taiwan to deter Chinese aggression. Early in 1997 USS Independence commenced a four month cruise, transiting to Guam, Australia, Malaysia, Singapore, Thailand, and then Hong Kong, the last U.S. carrier to port there before its reversion to Chinese control.

In January 1998 the squadron made an emergency, no-notice deployment to the Persian Gulf in support of Operation Southern Watch. The squadron returned home for a brief respite before getting underway again in July, this time to Hawaii to cross-deck onto their new home, USS Kitty Hawk. The squadron received the Safety "S" for the first half of 1998.

In January 1999, VAQ-136 was awarded the 1998 COMNAVAIRPAC Battle Efficiency "E". On 2 March 1999, VAQ-136 and the Kitty Hawk Battle group departed Yokosuka, Japan for three months of routine operations and exercises in the Western Pacific. The squadron participated in the multi-national and multi-service exercise Tandem Thrust off Guam before USS Kitty Hawk was ordered to the Persian Gulf in support of Operation Southern Watch. Over the following eleven weeks, the squadron flew 115 combat sorties over the skies of Iraq. When Kitty Hawk pulled into Dubai, UAE, for several days of liberty, the squadron was tasked to provide uninterrupted Electronic Warfare support for coalition aircraft flying from Prince Sultan Air Base (PSAB), Saudi Arabia.

=== 2000-2020 ===
In 2010, VAQ-136 was awarded the "Battle E" for combat efficiency and the "Golden Wrench" Award for maintenance excellence by Commander, Naval Air Forces.

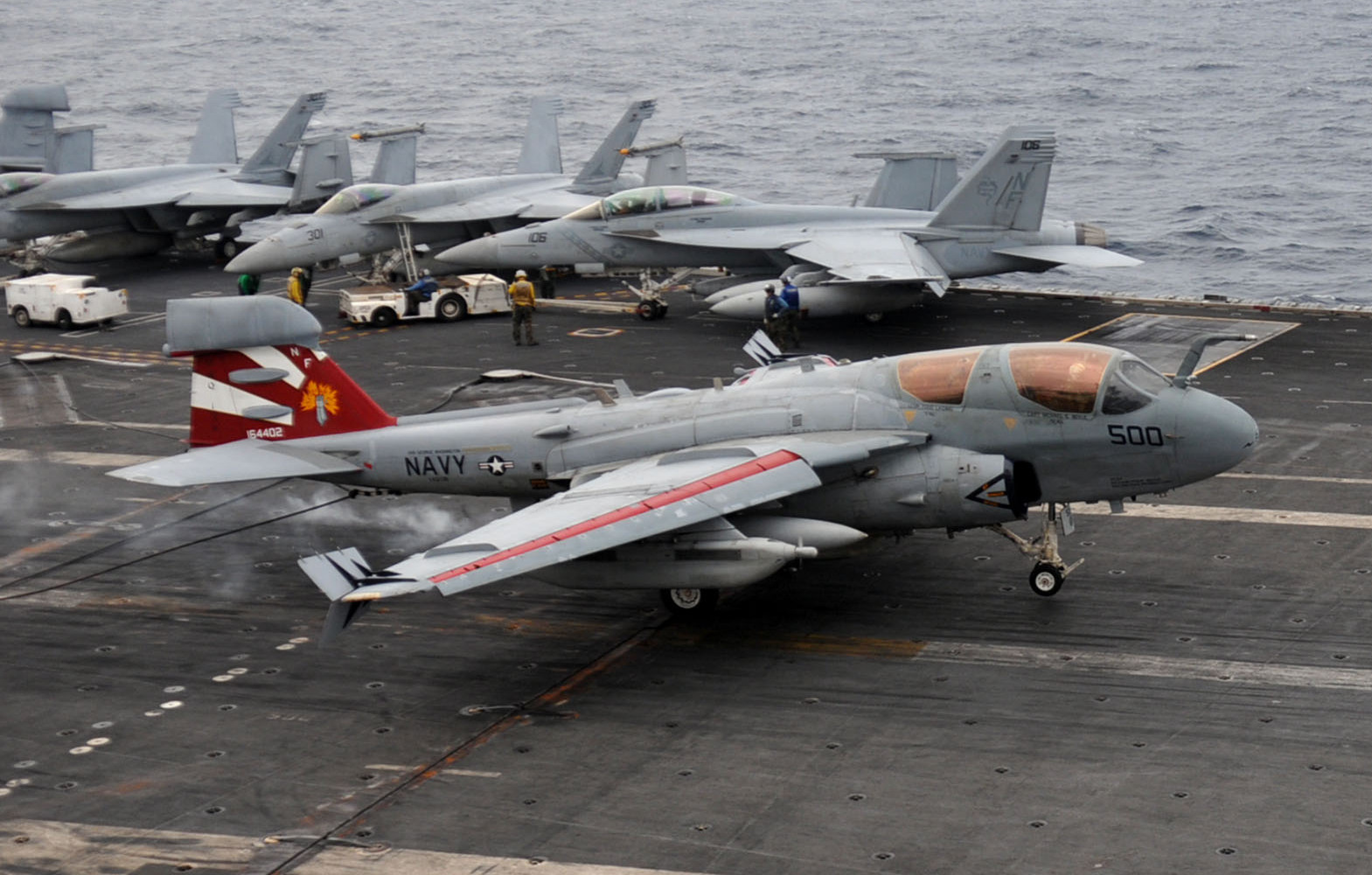
VAQ-136 EA-6B lands aboard USS George Washington (CVN-73) in 2011

In February 2012, the Navy announced that the squadron would transfer to Naval Air Station Whidbey Island in early 2012 to prepare for reequipping with the EA-18G Growler.

As of February 2013 they began flying the EA-18G Growler at NAS Whidbey Island with a tail code of "NG". In 2016 they were reassigned to Carrier Air Wing Two and changed to a tail code of "NE".

Following a successful underway period in support of Westpac and RIMPAC in late 2017, the Gauntlets entered a prolonged maintenance phase. Of note, they were the first Growler squadron to increase aircraft allotment from five to seven.

The "plus up" came with an accompanying increase in personnel, almost doubling the size of the ready room and substantially adding to maintenance manning.

=== 2020s ===
The squadron began their workup cycle in summer of 2020 in anticipation of upcoming deployments with Carrier Air Wing Two, fondly dubbed "Air Wing of the Future" in reference to its complement of F-35C Lightning, high lot F/A-18E/F Super Hornet, MVB-22 Osprey and E-2D Advanced Hawkeye.

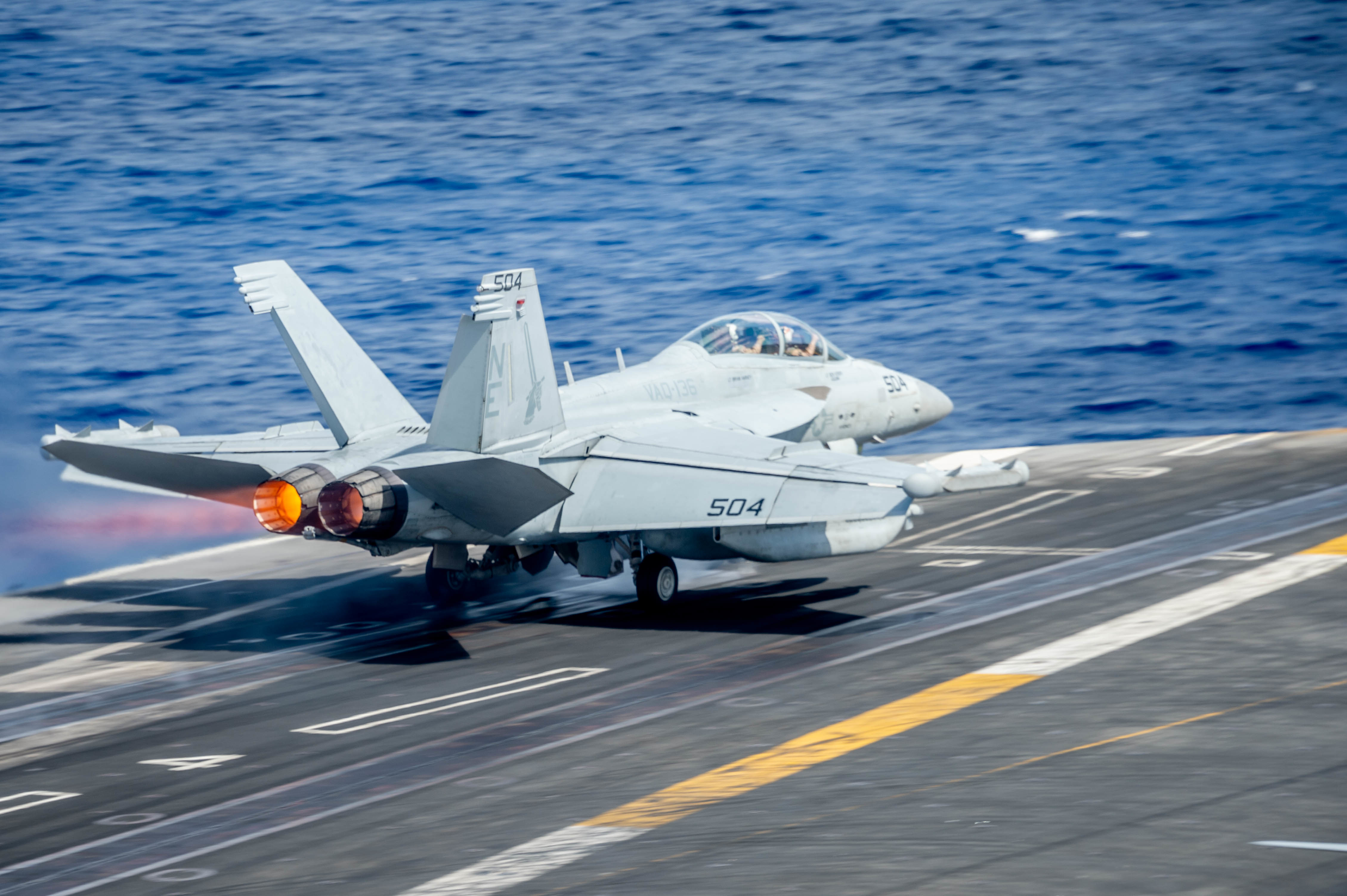
VAQ-136 EA-18G Growler launches from USS Carl Vinson in 2022

In mid November 2024, VAQ-136 and their EA-18Gs departed the US as part of CVW-2 on a scheduled deployment aboard the USS Carl Vinson

Following multiple exercises with Pacific Rim militaries, VAQ-136 and CVW-2 were ordered to operate in the Red Sea in defense of international shipping lanes and Israel against Houthi/Iran proxy military unit attacks from Yemen.

VAQ-136 and CVW-2 arrived in the CENTCOM AOR in early April 2025 with extensive combat operations against the Houthis/Iranians commencing upon arrival to the region.

== See also ==
- Naval aviation
- United States Naval Aviator
- Modern US Navy carrier air operations
- List of United States Navy aircraft squadrons
- List of Inactive United States Navy aircraft squadrons
- List of United States Navy aircraft designations (pre-1962) / List of US Naval aircraft
