= Carrier Air Wing Two =

- Founded: 1 May 1945
- Country: United States
- Branch: United States Navy
- Type: Carrier air wing
- Part of: Carrier Strike Group 1
- Garrison/HQ: NAS Lemoore
- Mottos: "For Liberty, We Fight"
- Tail code: NE
- Engagements: Korean War; Vietnam War; Iranian Hostage Crisis; Gulf War; Operation Desert Storm; Operation Restore Hope; Operation Southern Watch; Iraq War; Operation Iraqi Freedom; War in Afghanistan; Operation Unified Assistance; Operation Prosperity Guardian; Operation Poseidon Archer
- Decorations: Navy Unit Commendation; Armed Forces Expeditionary Medal; Meritorious Unit Commendation

Commanders
- Commander: CAPT Eric J. Bell, USN
- Deputy Commander: CAPT Douglas Oldham, USN
- Command Master Chief: CMDCM Trey Hauptmann, USN

Carrier Air Wing Two (CVW-2) is a United States Navy aircraft carrier air wing based at Naval Air Station Lemoore. The air wing is currently attached to the aircraft carrier USS Carl Vinson (CVN-70).

== Subordinate units ==
CVW-2 consists of 8 squadrons and 1 detachment (VRM-30).

Code	Insignia	Squadron	Nickname	Assigned Aircraft
VFA-2		Strike Fighter Squadron 2	Bounty Hunters	F/A-18F Super Hornet
VFA-97		Strike Fighter Squadron 97	Warhawks	F-35C Lightning II
VFA-113		Strike Fighter Squadron 113	Stingers	F/A-18E Super Hornet
VFA-192		Strike Fighter Squadron 192	Golden Dragons	F/A-18E Super Hornet
VAW-113		Carrier Airborne Early Warning Squadron 113	Black Eagles	E-2D Hawkeye
VAQ-136		Electronic Attack Squadron 136	Gauntlets	EA-18G Growler
VRM-30		Fleet Logistics Multi-Mission Squadron 30 Det. 1	Titans	CMV-22B Osprey
HSC-4		Helicopter Sea Combat Squadron 4	Black Knights	MH-60S Seahawk
HSM-78		Helicopter Maritime Strike Squadron 78	Blue Hawks	MH-60R Seahawk

== History ==
=== 1940s–1950s ===
Originally established as CVBG-74 (Battle Air Group) on 1 May 1945, it was renamed CVBG-1 on 15 November 1946 before finally being renamed CVG-2 in 1948. During that time, CVG-2 was assigned to USS Midway (CVB-41). CVG-2 later would see action during the Korean War on board the Essex-class carriers USS Boxer, Valley Forge and Philippine Sea. During the war, they supported the Inchon Invasion, bombing of North Korea-occupied Seoul and the recapture of Kimpo Airfield. Starting in 1958, the squadron started an 8-year association with the USS Midway which ended in 1966.

=== 1960s ===
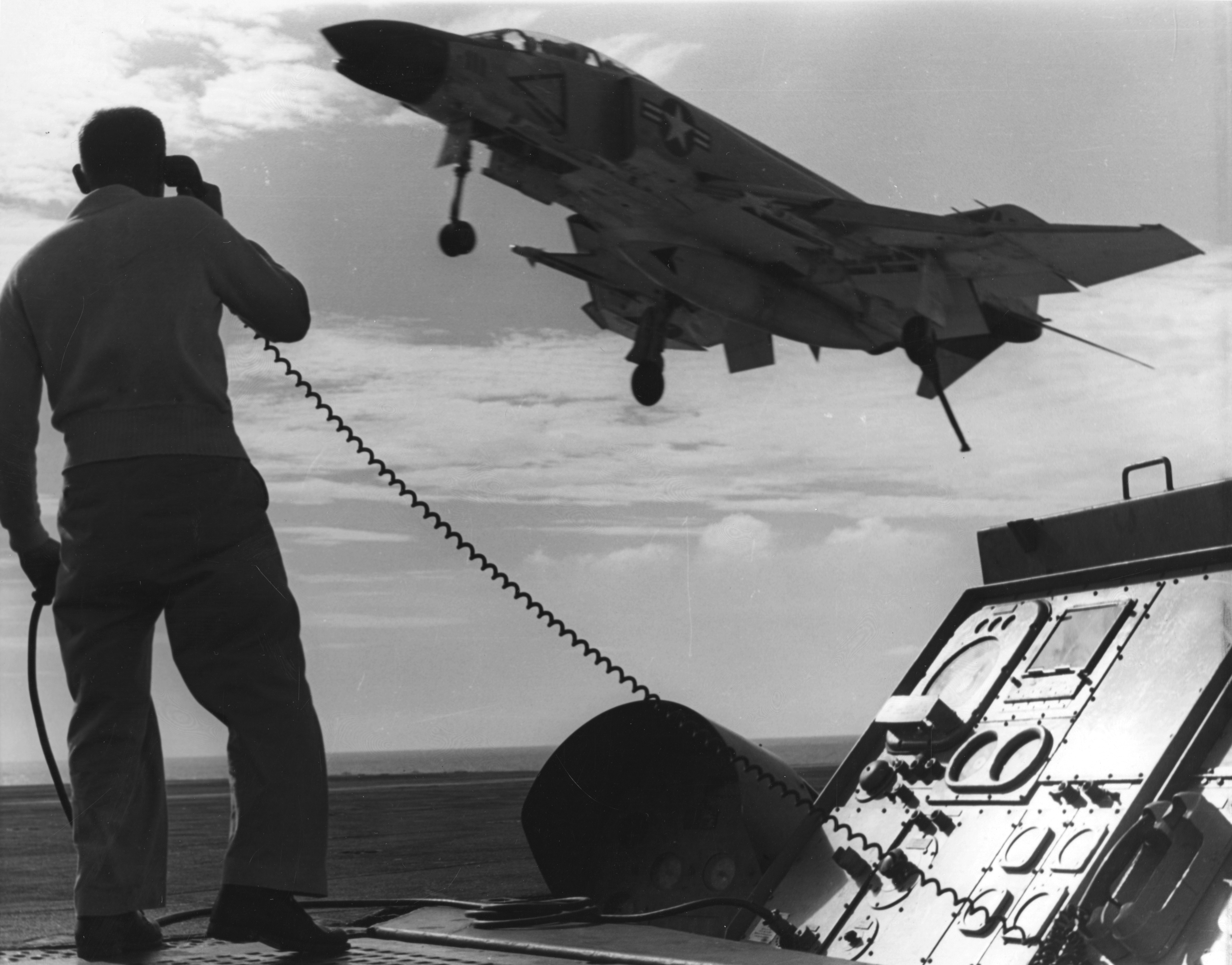
An F-4B from VF-21 as part of CVW-2 returns to the USS Midway after a combat mission over Vietnam in 1965. Pictured is CAG LSO, LCDR Vernon L. Jumper.

In 1961, the first A4D-2 (A-4B) Skyhawks to join CVW-2 came aboard during a deployment in the Taiwan Strait during tensions between the two Chinas (People's Republic of China and 'Republic of China' on Taiwan). In late 63', CVG-2 made their first deployment with the new F-4H-1F (F-4B) Phantom II with VF-21.

It during the first deployment to the Vietnam War that VF-21 as part of the renamed CVW-2 scored the first air to air kills of Vietnam War. In a first for CVW-2, the air wing deployed with the F-4 as the only fighter aircraft on board as well as the E-2A Hawkeye joining the air wing. It was in 1967 that CVW-2 began their long assignment to the USS Ranger (CV/A-61) which would last till the Ranger's retirement in 1993 (excluding the mid-1980s). With the new A-7A Corsair II and A-6A Intruder, they became the first all-jet attack carrier air wing. CVW-2 spent thirty days in the Sea of Japan due to seizure of the USS Pueblo (AGER-2).

=== 1970s ===
In December 1972 during their last deployment in the Vietnam War, CVW-2's squadrons introduced laser-guided bombs into Navy combat service, with VA-145 destroying fourteen out of fifteen targeted bridges in under 3 hours. CVW-2 was later renamed from Attack Carrier Air Wing Two to Carrier Air Wing Two due to the addition of Anti-submarine warfare units including VS-29 flying the S-3A Viking and HS-4 flying the SH-3D/G (later SH-3H) Sea King helicopter.

=== 1980s ===
Starting in 1980, the first F-14A Tomcat squadrons VF-1 and VF-2 were assigned to CVW-2, replacing VF-154 and VF-21 both flying the F-4J Phantom. Between 1982 and 1986, CVW-2 was reassigned to the USS Kitty Hawk (CV-63) making one deployment to the West Pacific and Indian Ocean along with the newly assigned VS-38. In May 1986, CVW-2 returned to the Ranger. Starting between 1986 and 1993, CVW-2 was nicknamed the "Grumman Air Wing" due to lack of a light attack squadron flying either the A-7E Corsair II or the newer F/A-18A Hornet. The only change made was with the newer VA-155 replacing the USMC squadron VMA(AW)-121 in 1990.

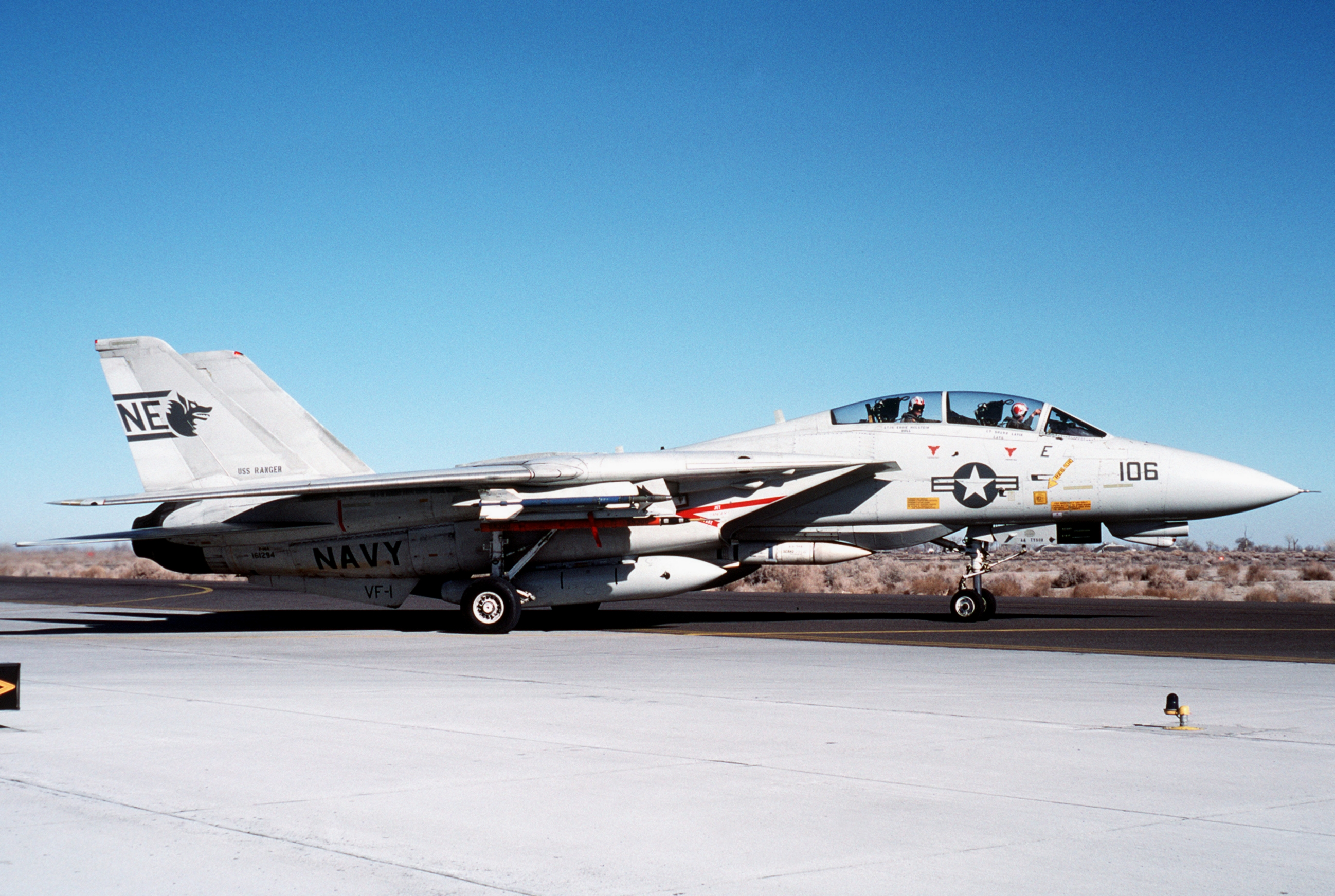
An F-14A Tomcat of VF-1 assigned to CVW-2 in 1986.

=== 1990s ===
With the invasion of Kuwait by Iraq on 2 August 1990, USS Ranger and CVW-2 deployed on 8 December to take in Operation Desert Shield, transiting the Strait of Hormuz on 15 January 1991. At around 4:00 am on 17 January 1991, while USS Midway's air wing were striking targets in Iraq on the first night of the war, the "William Tell Overture" was broadcast around the Ranger as CVW-2 launched to strike targets that morning. During the strike, CVW-2's aircraft struck the port of Umm Qasr and the Mina al-Bakr oil terminal with cluster bombs. For the next 75 hours, they flew more strike missions against Iraqi military targets. During war, the "Grumman Air Wing" was well suited as the primary night Air Wing, with 75 percent of their 10,500 hours being flown at night. With the war over in February 1991, the Ranger and CVW-2 returned to San Diego on 8 June 1991.

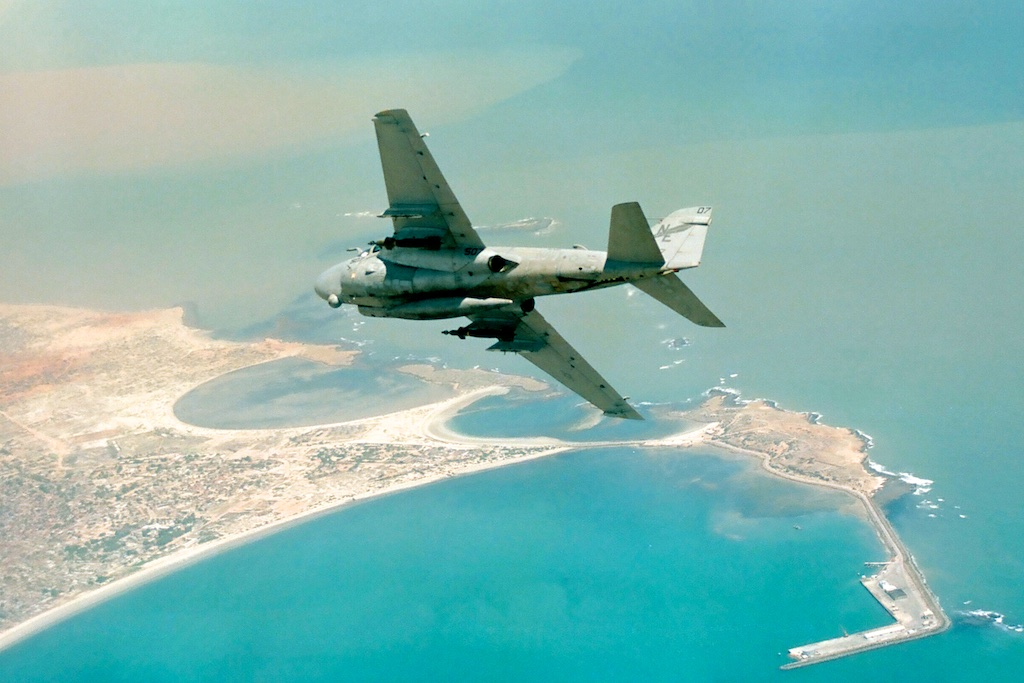
An A-6E SWIP Intruder of VA-145 over Somalia on 7 December 1992. This was during Operation Restore Hope.

In 1992, after taking in Operation Southern Watch, CVW-2 sailed to Somalia becoming the first Air Wing to take part in Operation Restore Hope, providing air coverage for ground forces and controlling all air traffic into the capital of Mogadishu.

In early 1993, VA-155, VF-1 and USS Ranger were decommissioned followed by VA-145 as the A-6E TRAM Intruder was being retired from Navy service. During that time, CVW-2 moved the USS Constellation CV-64 and became the first 50 Strike Fighter Air Wing in the US Navy. Between 1995 and 1997, CVW-2 deployed also with a detachment from VQ-5 flying the ES-3A Shadow based on the S-3 Viking.

=== 2000s ===
During its 2004–2005 deployment, Carrier Air Wing Two executed 4400 fixed-wing sorties for a total of 7588 flight hours, as well as 1518 rotary-wing sorties for a total of 4401 flight hours. The air wing also completed 4455 flight deck landings (traps) while also flying 1737 humanitarian relief missions in support of Operation Unified Assistance between 26 December 2004 and 3 February 2005.

During its 2006 deployment, Carrier Air Wing Two participated in three major exercises (i.e., Foal Eagle 06, Valiant Shield 06, RIMPAC 06), and its aircraft flew 7,871 sorties, with a total of 7,578 catapult launches from the flight deck of the Abraham Lincoln. Between 24–31 March 2006, during Foal Eagle 2006 exercises, strike squadrons VFA-2, VFA-34, VFA-137, and VFA-151 from Carrier Air Wing Two teamed with U.S. Air Force aircraft from the 18th Wing based at Kadena Air Base to provide combat air patrols and coordinated bombing runs via the exercise's Combined Air Operations Center.

During its 2008 deployment, Carrier Air Wing Two flew approximately 7,100 sorties, totaling more than 22,000 flight hours, which included 2,307 combat sorties that dropped 255,963 pounds (116,102.86 kg) of ordnance in support of Operation Enduring Freedom – Afghanistan (OEF-A) and Operation Iraqi Freedom (OIF) as a part of the U.S. Fifth Fleet.

=== 2010s ===
When Abraham Lincoln began its Refueling and Complex Overhaul in 2013, CVW-2 was reassigned to USS Ronald Reagan (CVN-76). It made only a short deployment aboard Ronald Reagan during exercise RIMPAC between June and August 2014, before the carrier was stationed in Japan. CVW-2 then accompanied USS George Washington (CVN-73) for her voyage around South America from September to December 2015.

In 2016, CVW-2 was reassigned to USS Carl Vinson. The wing made its next deployment to the Western Pacific aboard Carl Vinson from 23 January to 23 June 2017.

On 5 January 2018, CVW-2 left San Diego aboard Carl Vinson for another scheduled deployment to the Western Pacific. Carl Vinson returned to San Diego on 12 April 2018.

== Current force ==
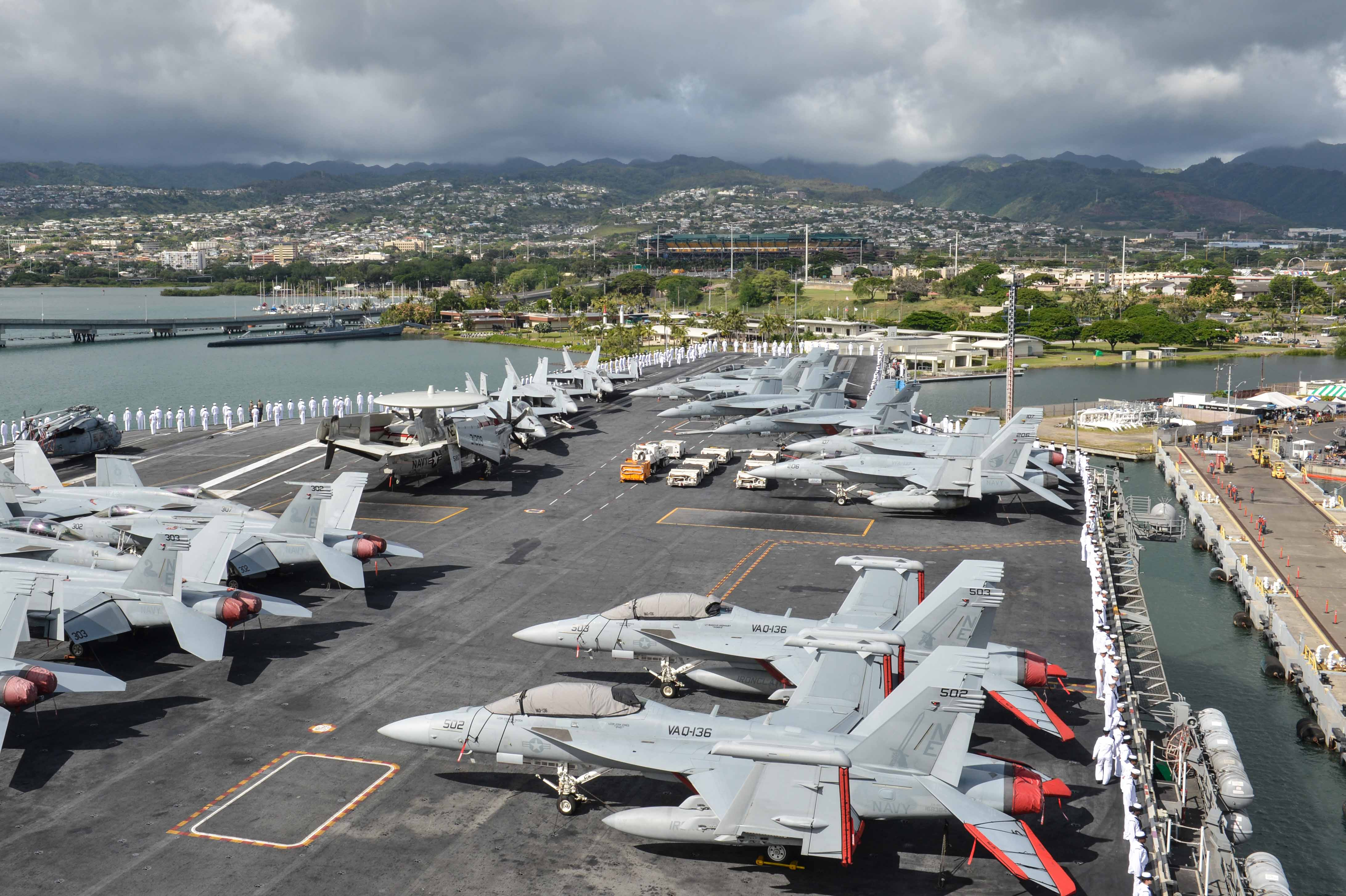
CVW-2 aircraft on Ronald Reagan at Pearl Harbor during RIMPAC 2014.

=== Fixed-wing aircraft ===
- F/A-18E/F Super Hornet
- F-35C Lightning II
- E/A-18G Growler
- E-2D Advanced Hawkeye
- CMV-22B Osprey

=== Rotary-wing aircraft ===
- MH-60R Seahawk
- MH-60S Seahawk

== See also ==
- List of United States Navy Carrier air wings
- History of the United States Navy
