= Carrier Strike Group 5 =

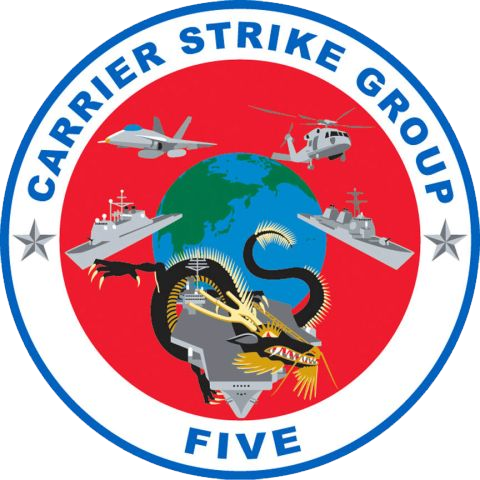
- Carrier Strike Group 5 crest
- Active: 25 April 1944 to date
- Country: United States
- Branch: United States Navy
- Type: Carrier Strike Group
- Part of: U.S. Seventh Fleet
- Homeport: Fleet Activities Yokosuka, Japan
- Nickname: George Washington Carrier Strike Group
- Motto: First to Fight
- Engagements: World War II; Korean War; Vietnam War; Operation Desert Storm; Operation Enduring Freedom; Operation Iraqi Freedom
- Website: Official Website

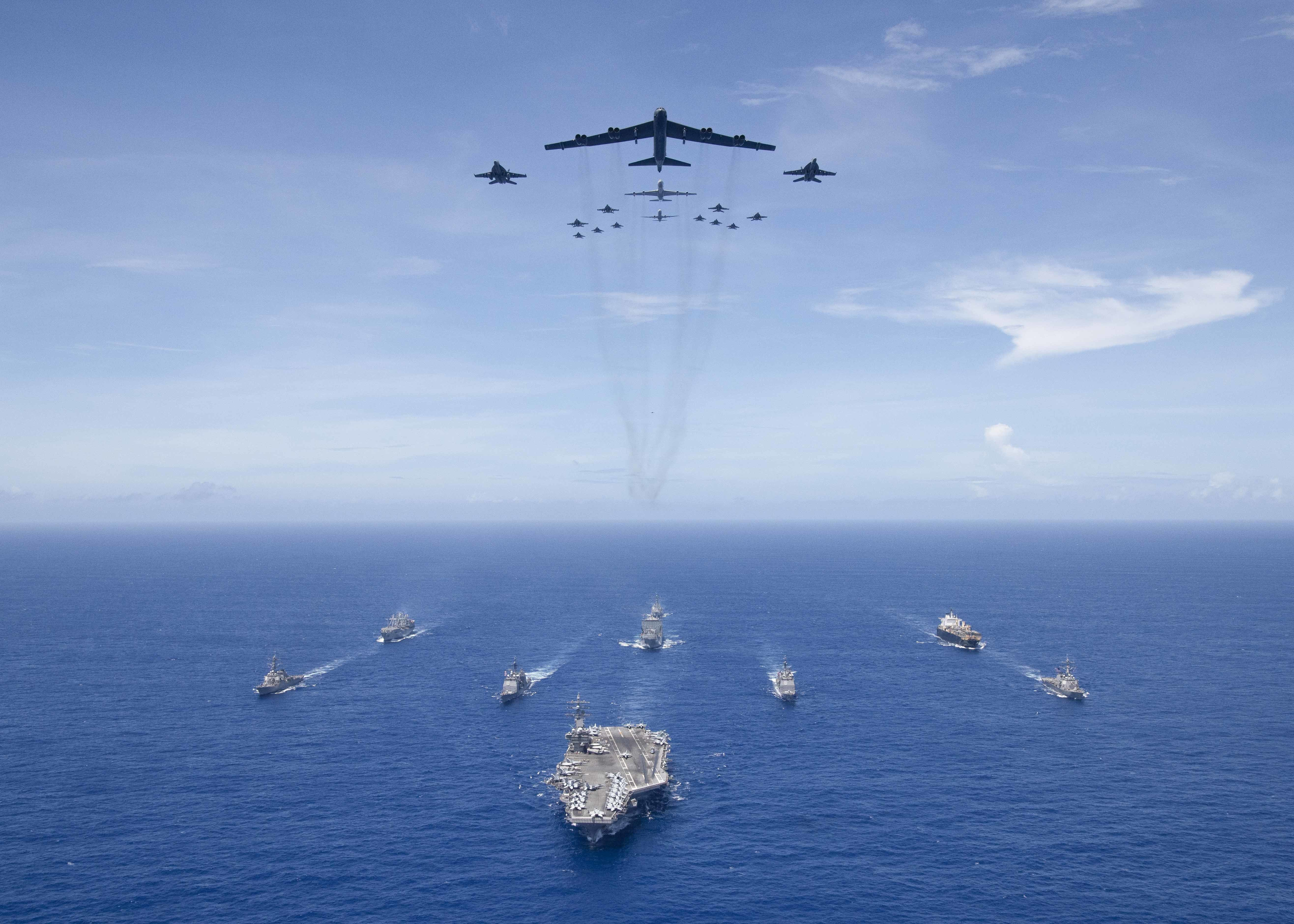
Carrier Strike Group 5 led by USS Ronald Reagan with Air Force B-52 Stratofortress and Navy F/A-18 Hornet aircraft in September 2018

Carrier Strike Group 5, also known as CSG 5 or CARSTRKGRU 5, is the U.S. Navy carrier strike group assigned to the United States Pacific Fleet and permanently forward-deployed to the U.S. 7th Fleet. The strike group's flagship is the Nimitz-class aircraft carrier USS George Washington (CVN-73) which also embarks Strike Warfare Commander, Carrier Air Wing Five (CVW 5) and its nine squadrons. As of June 2015, CSG 5 includes two Ticonderoga-class cruisers and Destroyer Squadron Fifteen (CDS 15), which serves as the Sea Combat Commander and is responsible for nine assigned Arleigh Burke-class destroyers.

CSG 5 is responsible for unit-level training, integrated training, and material readiness for the group's ships and aviation squadrons. As the only continuously forward-deployed carrier strike group, the CSG-5 staff does not stand down when the strike group is in Yokosuka, but instead continues to maintain support ROR deploying Carrier Strike Groups, that operate in the Seventh Fleet operating area. The commander and staff are also responsible for the higher level Task Force 70 duties throughout the year in addition to the CSG-5 duties. The composition of the strike group in immediate proximity of George Washington varies throughout the year.

The CSG 5 Commander also serves as commander, Task Force (CTF 70) for 7th Fleet. In these responsibilities, CSG 5 serves as the Theater Strike Warfare Commander (TSTWC), commander of the George Washington carrier strike group, and provides advice and support to other carrier strike groups operating in the Seventh Fleet operating area. As the Theater Strike Warfare Commander, CSG-5 is responsible for coordinating fires against land targets throughout the Seventh Fleet operating area. Since 2023 CTF-70 also oversees CTF-71 the Theater Surface Warfare Commander, duties assigned to Destroyer Squadron 15 (DESRON 15).

As CTF-71, DESRON 15 oversees all independently deploying U.S cruisers, destroyers, frigates, and Coast Guard cutters operating in the 7th Fleet area of responsibility.

CTF-70 oversees two forward-deployed cruisers, USS Chancellorsville (CG-62) and USS Antietam (CG-54), who alternate serving as Theater Integrated Air Missile Defense Commander (TIAMDC) for 7th Fleet.

George Washington and the ten surface combatant ships operate out of Yokosuka, Japan, while CVW 5 operates out of Iwakuni, Japan, when not embarked on George Washington. Together, these units form the U.S. Navy's only continuously forward-deployed (and largest) carrier strike group.

== Subordinate units ==
Flagship

Insignia	Name	Class
	USS George Washington (CVN 73)	Nimitz-class aircraft carrier

Other ships

Insignia	Name	Class
	USS Robert Smalls (CG 62)	Ticonderoga-class cruiser

CVW 5 consists of 9 Squadrons

Code	Insignia	Squadron	Nickname	Assigned Aircraft
VFA-27		Strike Fighter Squadron 27	Royal Maces	F/A-18E Super Hornet
VFA-102		Strike Fighter Squadron 102	Diamondbacks	F/A-18F Super Hornet
VFA-147		Strike Fighter Squadron 147	Argonauts	F-35C Lightning II
VFA-195		Strike Fighter Squadron 195	Dambusters	F/A-18E Super Hornet
VAW-125		Airborne Command & Control Squadron 125	Tiger Tails	E-2D Hawkeye
VAQ-141		Electronic Attack Squadron 141	Shadowhawks	EA-18G Growler
VRC-30		Fleet Logistics Support Squadron 30 Det. 5	Providers	C-2A Greyhound
HSC-12		Helicopter Sea Combat Squadron 12	Golden Falcons	MH-60S Seahawk
HSM-77		Helicopter Maritime Strike Squadron 77	Saberhawks	MH-60R Seahawk

Other Squadrons

Code	Insignia	Squadron	Nickname	Assigned Aircraft
HSM-51		Helicopter Maritime Strike Squadron 51	Warlords	MH-60R Seahawk

== History ==
=== World War II ===
On 25 April 1944, Rear Admiral Frank D. Wagner formed Carrier Division Five when he assumed command aboard USS Wasp and USS Hornet in Pearl Harbor. Rear Admiral Joseph J. Clark succeeded Wagner and commanded the division through 12 months of sustained combat operations in the Western Pacific and waters surrounding Japan, working for both Third Fleet (ADM William Halsey) and Fifth Fleet (ADM Raymond Spruance). This included participation in the First and Second Philippine Sea Battles and the Iwo Jima and Okinawa campaigns. Clark was succeeded by Rear Admiral Arthur C. Davis in July 1945.

=== Korean War ===
During the Korean War, Rear Admiral G.R. Henderson commanded Carrier Division 5 and served as commander, Task Force (CTF) 70 and 77 aboard USS Princeton (CV 37). Carrier Division 5 moved back and forth between Yokosuka, Japan and the Korean Theater, serving as CTF 70 or 77 on multiple occasions.

On 1 August 1955, Carrier Division 5 comprised Essex (Bremerton), Kearsarge, and Shangri-La (both homeported in San Diego).

=== Vietnam War ===
Prior to the Vietnam War, the location of Carrier Division 5 moved between several Pacific ports and utilized rotating carriers from the West coast of the U.S. as its flagship. During the Vietnam War, 12 different commanders led Carrier Division 5 and Task Force 77 in numerous combat deployments to the Vietnam War zone. Beginning in 1964 Carrier Group Five was permanently deployed to the Western Pacific and dual-hatted CTF 70/77, homeported at Naval Air Station Cubi Point in the Philippines.

In December 1971, Commander Carrier Division 5, Rear Admiral Damon W. Cooper, led Task Force 74 aboard Enterprise to the Indian Ocean following the outbreak of the Indo-Pakistani War of 1971.

Carrier Division 5 became Carrier Group 5 on 30 June 1973, and in October, Carrier Group 5 arrived in Yokosuka, Japan aboard USS Midway marking the first forward-deployment of a complete Carrier Battle Group in a Japanese port (the associated Air Wing, CVW-5, moved into Atsugi, Japan this same year). On 1 January 1974, still homeported at Cubi Point, the group was responsible for three carriers: USS Kitty Hawk CVA-63 and USS Constellation CVA-64 both homeported at San Diego and USS Enterprise (CVAN-65) homeported at Alameda. Carrier Group Five shifted its forward-deployed location from Cubi Point, Republic of the Philippines to Yokosuka, Japan in July 1989. Midway remained in Yokosuka for 18 years and was relieved by Independence (CV-62) on 11 September 1991.

=== Afghanistan and Iraq ===
In the leadup to the Gulf War, Rear Admiral Daniel March, commander, Carrier Group 5, became commander, Task Force 154 (Battle Force Zulu), part of Naval Forces Central Command. The Task Force directed four carriers (USS Midway (CV-41), USS Ranger (CV-61), USS America (CV-66), and USS Theodore Roosevelt (CV-71)) in the Arabian Sea/Persian Gulf during Operation Desert Storm.

On 11 August 1998, USS Kitty Hawk (CV-63) relieved Independence as the Carrier Group 5 flagship. After the terrorist attacks in New York City and Washington, DC, on 11 September 2001, the Kitty Hawk Battle Group was ordered to deploy to the Indian Ocean and was later involved in combat missions against the Taliban and Al Qaida in Afghanistan. The ships got underway again in January 2003 with orders to deploy to the Persian Gulf as part of the build-up of military forces in the area in preparation for the war against the regime of Saddam Hussein in Iraq. Kitty Hawk arrived on station late February/early March and from 20 March on, participated in air strikes against targets in Iraq as part of Operation Iraqi Freedom.

USS George Washington (CVN-73) relieved Kitty Hawk on 25 September 2008. Carrier Group Five was renamed Carrier Strike Group 5 on 1 October 2004.

=== Humanitarian assistance and disaster relief ===
In 2011, Carrier Strike Group 5 participated in two humanitarian assistance operations, Operation Tomodachi in Japan and support to Thailand during their worst flooding in 50 years.

On 11 November 2013 George Washington Carrier Strike Group (GWCSG) was ordered to the Republic of the Philippines in response to Typhoon Haiyan/Yolanda. The strike group, commanded by Rear Adm. Mark Montgomery, was assigned as Joint Force Maritime Component Commander for the disaster relief which was named Operation Damayan, and the force was assigned to Joint Task Force 505, commanded by Marine Corps Lt. Gen. John E. Wissler (Commanding general, III Marine Expeditionary Force). For Operation Damayan, the strike group included USS George Washington (CVN-73), six surface combatants, 23 helicopters from three squadrons, three Military Sealift Command ships and two amphibious ships all crewed by 8,000 sailors, The strike group concentrated its relief efforts on the islands of Leyte and Samar and the cities of Tacloban and Guiuan, delivering nearly 1,000,000 pounds of food, water and medical supplies and transporting more than 2,500 displaced personnel. Yolanda had reached speeds up to 195 miles per hour (mph), gusts up to 235 mph and landfall waves of 50 feet. According to the Philippine government's national disaster risk reduction and management council, the super typhoon impacted more than 4.2 million people across 36 provinces in the Philippines.

=== Hull swap ===
On 14 January 2014, the U.S. Navy announced that USS Ronald Reagan (CVN-76) will replace George Washington as the flagship of Carrier Strike Group 5. George Washington was scheduled to undergo her mid-life complex refueling and overhaul at Newport News Shipbuilding shipyard in Newport News, Virginia. Carrier Air Wing Five will continue to be assigned to Carrier Strike Group 5.

=== 2017 deployment ===
In May 2017, Ronald Reagan completed a Selected Restricted Availability maintenance in Yokosuka, Japan, and joined the USS Carl Vinson and Carrier Strike Group 1 in the Sea of Japan amid increased tensions over North Korea's nuclear weapons program. The rest of CSG 5 including the USS Shiloh, USS Barry, USS McCampbell, USS Fitzgerald, and USS Mustin arrived in early June. The two Strike Groups were also joined by the Japan Maritime Self-Defense Force vessels JDS Hyūga and JDS Ashigara.

On 17 June, the USS Fitzgerald was involved in a collision with the Philippine-flagged cargo vessel MV ACX Crystal in the East Sea of Korea. The Fitzgerald suffered heavy damage and seven members of her crew were killed with three more injured, including the ship's CO Cmdr. Bryce Benson. The ship was taken to Yokosuka, Japan, for repairs after the injured crew members were evacuated by helicopter.

== Commanders ==
Group commanders since 2000 have included:

• Rear Admiral Robert F. Willard	(September 2000 – September 2001)
• Rear Admiral Steve Kunkel	(September 2001 – February 2003)
• Rear Admiral Matthew Moffit	(March 2003 – May 2003)
• Rear Admiral James Kelly	(July 2003 – July 2005)
• Rear Admiral Douglas McClain	(July 2005 – February 2007)
• Rear Admiral Richard Wren	(February 2007 – December 2008)
• Rear Admiral Kevin M. Donegan	(December 2008 – May 2010)
• Rear Admiral Dan Cloyd	(May 2010 – April 2011)
• Rear Admiral J. R. Haley	(April 2011 – January 2013)
• Rear Admiral Mark Montgomery	(January 2013 – October 2014)
• Rear Admiral John Alexander	(October 2014 – July 2016)
• Rear Admiral Charles Williams	(July 2016 – September 2017)
• Rear Admiral Marc Dalton	(September 2017 – July 2018)
• Rear Admiral Karl O. Thomas	(July 2018 – September 2019)
• Rear Admiral George Wikoff	(September 2019 – November 2020)
• Rear Admiral Will Pennington	(November 2020 – October 2021)
• Rear Admiral Michael Donnelly	(October 2021 – June 2023)
• Rear Admiral Patrick J. Hannifin	(June 2023 – April 2024)
• Rear Admiral Gregory D. Newkirk	(April 2024 – June 2025)
• Rear Admiral Eric J. Anduze	(June 2025 – present)

== Current force ==
=== Surface combatants ===
- Nimitz-class aircraft carrier
- Ticonderoga-class cruiser
- Arleigh Burke-class destroyer

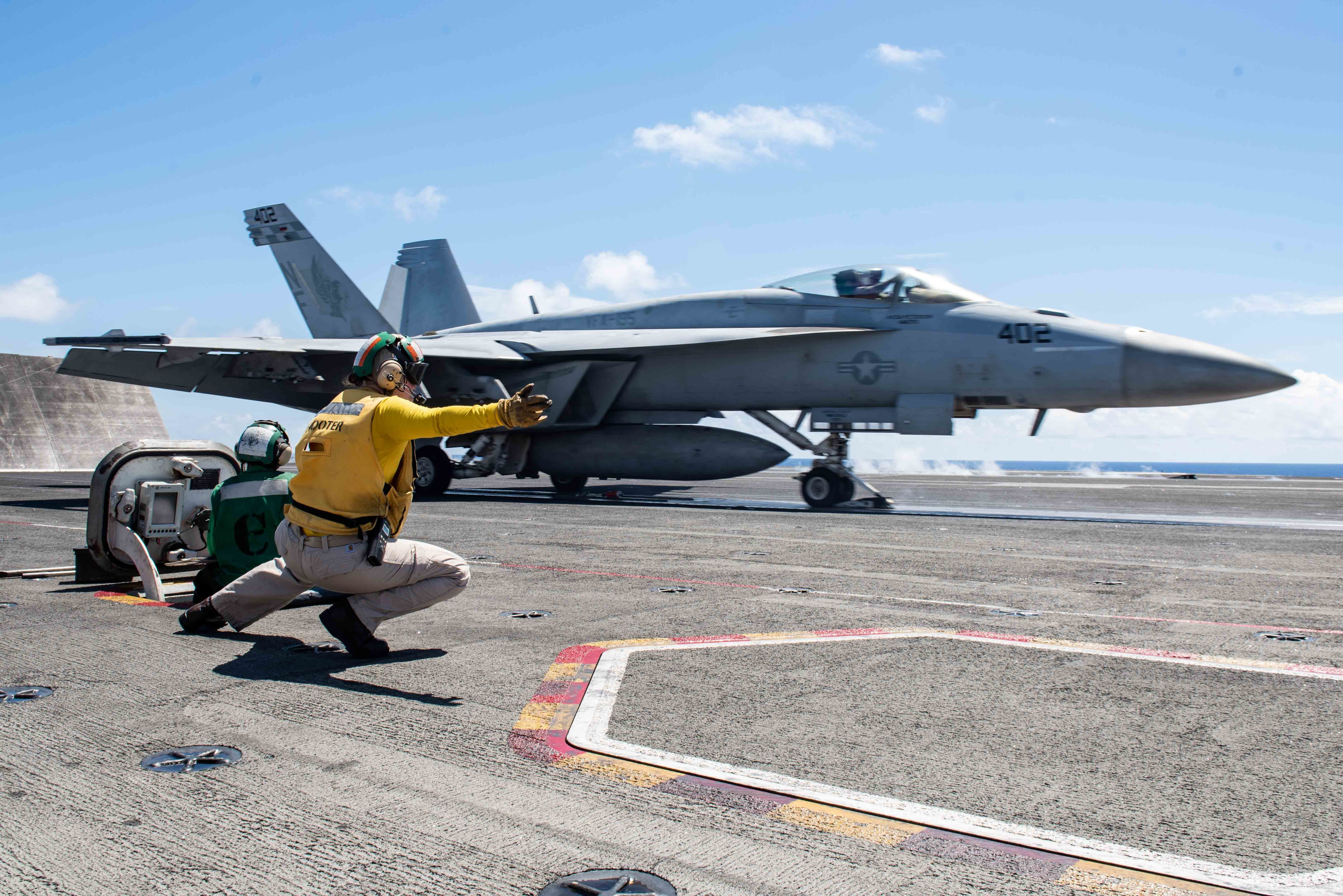
F/A-18E taking off from the USS Ronald Reagan

=== Fixed-wing aircraft ===
- F/A-18E/F Super Hornet
- F-35C Lightning II
- EA-18G Growler
- E-2D Hawkeye
- CMV-22B Osprey

=== Rotary wing aircraft ===
- MH-60S Seahawk
- MH-60R Seahawk
