= Carrier Air Wing Five =

- Active: 15 February 1943 – Present
- Country: United States
- Branch: United States Navy
- Type: Carrier Air Wing
- Part of: Carrier Strike Group 5
- Garrison/HQ: Marine Corps Air Station Iwakuni; Naval Air Facility Atsugi; USS George Washington
- Tail Code: NF
- Engagements: World War II; Korean War; Vietnam War; Operation Paul Bunyan; Operation Desert Shield; Operation Desert Storm; Operation Southern Watch; 1994 North Korean nuclear crisis 1996 Taiwan Strait Crisis; Operation Iraqi Freedom; Operation Enduring Freedom; Operation Epic Fury
- Website: CVW-5 Official site

Commanders
- Commander: CAPT Brian Kesselring
- Deputy Commander: CAPT Daniel O’Hara
- Command Master Chief: CMDCM. Andrew J. Thomasson

Carrier Air Wing Five (CVW-5) is a United States Navy aircraft carrier air wing based at Marine Corps Air Station Iwakuni. The air wing is attached to the aircraft carrier USS George Washington. It was initially formed in 1943. It has participated in the Second World War, the Korean War, the Gulf War, Operation Southern Watch, the War in Afghanistan, and the War in Iraq.

The wing's officially stated mission is 'To conduct carrier air warfare operations and assist in the planning, control, coordination and integration of seven air wing squadrons in support of carrier air warfare including; Interception and destruction of enemy aircraft and missiles in all-weather conditions to establish and maintain local air superiority. All-weather offensive air-to-surface attacks, Detection, localization, and destruction of enemy ships and submarines to establish and maintain local sea control. Aerial photographic, sighting, and electronic intelligence for naval and joint operations. Airborne early warning service to fleet forces and shore warning nets. Airborne electronic countermeasures. In-flight refueling operations to extend the range and the endurance of air wing aircraft and Search and rescue operations.'

The fixed-wing squadrons of the air wing transferred to Marine Corps Air Station Iwakuni in Yamaguchi prefecture in 2017 and early 2018.

== Subordinate units ==
CVW-5 consists of eight Squadrons and one Fleet Logistics Squadron Detachment

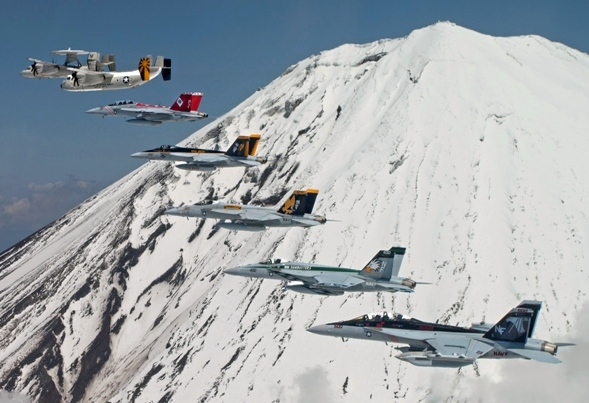
CVW-5 aircraft in 2012.

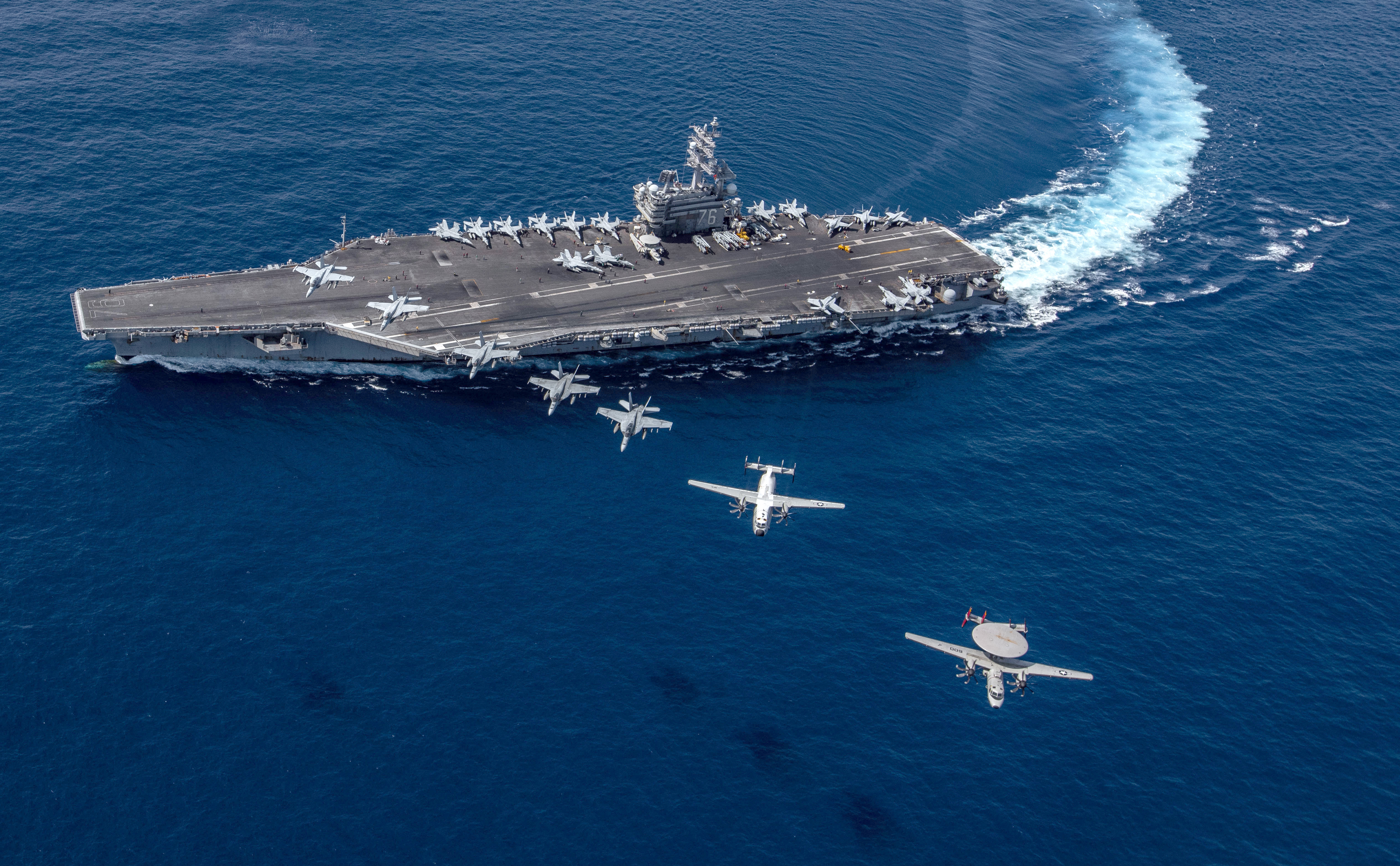
CVW-5 aircraft flying over the USS Ronald Reagan (CVN-76) in 2019

Code	Insignia	Squadron	Nickname	Assigned Aircraft
VFA-27		Strike Fighter Squadron 27	Royal Maces	F/A-18E Super Hornet
VFA-102		Strike Fighter Squadron 102	Diamondbacks	F/A-18F Super Hornet
VFA-147		Strike Fighter Squadron 147	Argonauts	F-35C Lightning II
VFA-195		Strike Fighter Squadron 195	Dambusters	F/A-18E Super Hornet
VAW-125		Carrier Airborne Early Warning Squadron 125	Tiger Tails	E-2D Hawkeye
VAQ-141		Electronic Attack Squadron 141	Shadowhawks	EA-18G Growler
VRM-30		Fleet Logistics Multi-Mission Squadron 30 Det.5	Titans	CMV-22B Osprey
HSC-12		Helicopter Sea Combat Squadron 12	Golden Falcons	MH-60S Seahawk
HSM-77		Helicopter Maritime Strike Squadron 77	Saberhawks	MH-60R Seahawk

== History ==
=== Early years ===
Originally commissioned as Carrier Air Group Five (CVG-5) on 15 February 1943 Naval Air Station, Norfolk, Virginia, assigned to the USS Yorktown (CV-10). The original air group was initially formed in 1938 and its squadrons all carried the "5" designation honoring the former hull number of its original aircraft carrier. The three original squadrons forming the Air Group were VF-5, VB-5 and VT-5. A fourth squadron, VBF-5, was added to the Air Group in May 1945. Homeported in San Diego, California, after the war, Carrier Air Group Five was re-designated CVAG-5 on 15 November 1946 in accordance with the Navy's new Carrier Air Group designation scheme and on 1 September 1948 it reverted to Carrier Air Group five (CVG-5) when the Navy again changed the Carrier Air Group designation scheme. The Air Group quickly recorded a number of firsts, including the first squadron to land a jet aircraft aboard a carrier (1948), the first jet aircraft in the Navy to shoot down enemy aircraft when two F9F-3 Panthers from VF-51 shot down two Korean People's Air Force Yak-9 fighters on 3 July 1950, the first to arrive in Yellow Sea, the first to launch jet aircraft against enemy, and the first to include both jet squadrons VF-51 and VF-52 with F9F-2 Panther jets, VF-53 and VF-54 with F4U Corsairs and VA-55 with AD-1 Skyraiders.

CVG-5 was the first air group to enter the Korean War, and after serving 18 months in the combat zone, had compiled more combat time than any other air group in the Korean War. CVG-5 was redesigned Carrier Air Wing Five (CVW-5) on 20 December 1963 when the Navy reclassified its carrier air groups as carrier air wings.

=== Vietnam War and Forward Deployment to Japan ===
In 1964, CVW-5 was called to action in the Gulf of Tonkin for a total of eight combat cruises.

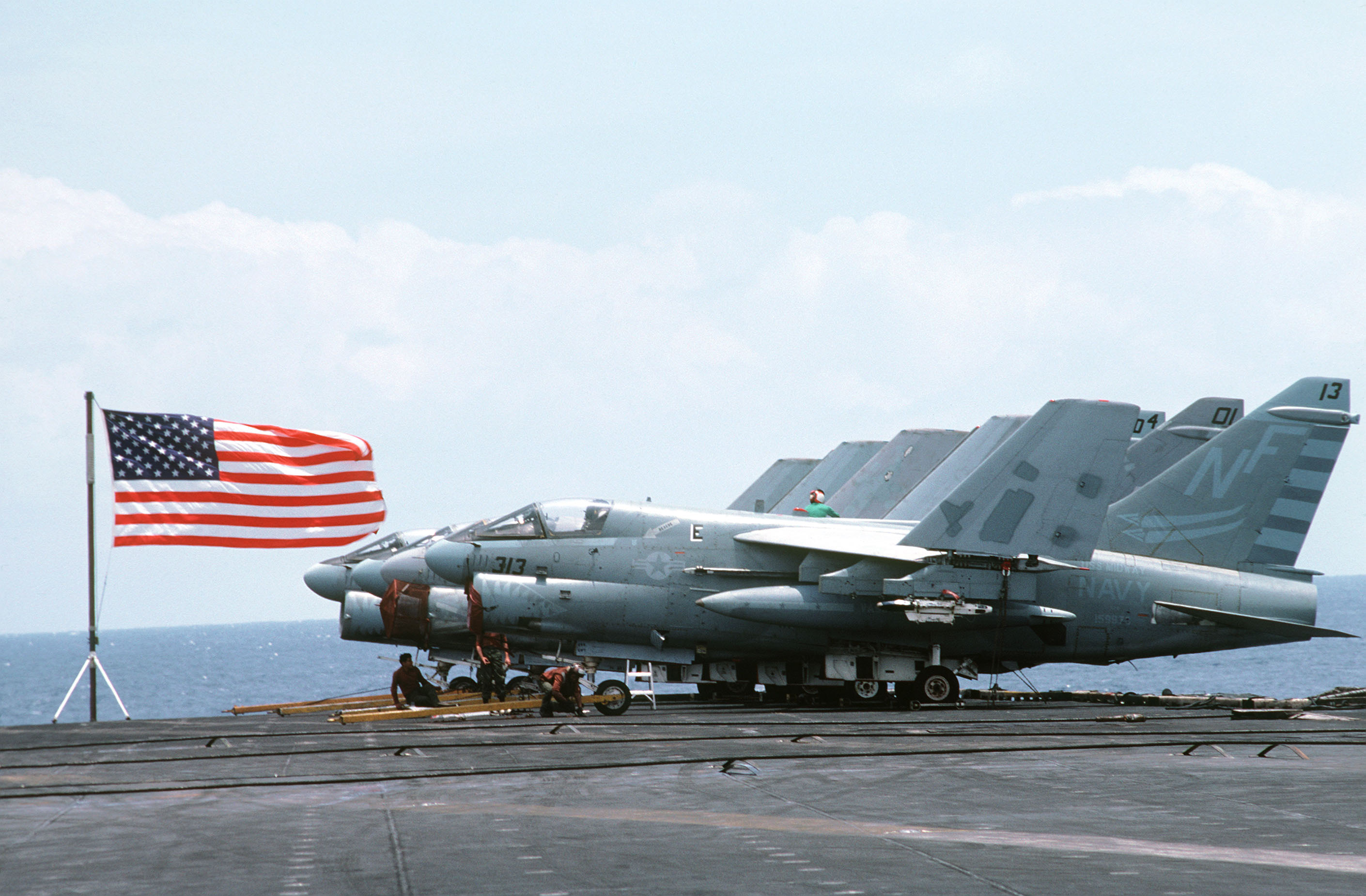
Three A-7Es from VA-93 aboard the USS Midway on 17 May 1984.

On 5 December 1965, a Broken Arrow incident occurred aboard USS Ticonderoga, upon which CVW-5 was embarked. A Douglas A-4E Skyhawk attack aircraft of VA-56 carrying a nuclear weapon fell into the sea. On the 31st day after departing Subic Bay, the attack jet fell over the side during a training exercise while being rolled from the number 2 hangar bay to the number 2 elevator. The pilot, Lieutenant (junior grade) Douglas M. Webster, the aircraft, A-4E BuNo 151022, (a re-designated A4D-5), of VA-56 Champions, and the B43 nuclear bomb were never recovered from the 16,000 ft (4,900 m) depth. The accident occurred 80 miles (130 km) from Okinawa. 1969–1970 CVW-5 was embarked on USS Bon Homme Richard (CV-31) with VA-22, VA-94, and VA-144 A-4 Squadrons, VF-51 and VF-53 F-8's

In 1973, CVW-5 embarked on USS Midway to become part of the first carrier/air wing team permanently forward deployed, to Yokosuka, Japan. In 1976, while aboard the Midway, CVW-5 took part in Operation Paul Bunyan during the Korean axe murder incident.

The wing completed 111 continuous days on station in the North Arabian Sea in 1984, which the wing's official site describes as 'guarding the Straits of Hormuz and guaranteeing the continued flow of vital oil to Japan and Western Europe.'

=== 1991 Gulf War ===
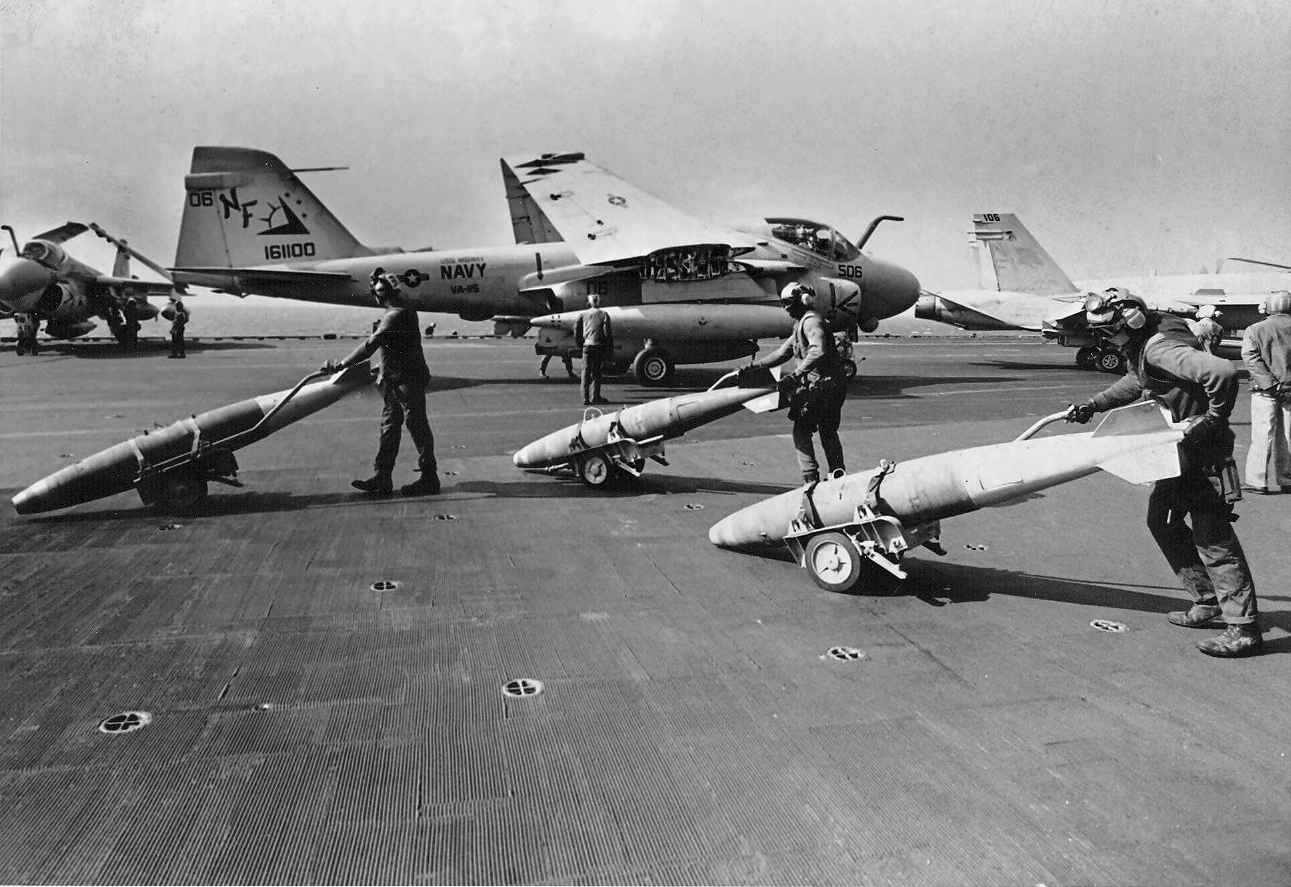
An A-6E TRAM Intruder (NF-506) from VA-115 and an F/A-18A Hornet (NF-106) from VFA-195 taxi to a catapult during the Gulf War.

CVW-5 began its final combat cruise aboard the Midway on 2 October 1990 as part of Operation Desert Shield to the Persian Gulf in response to the Invasion of Kuwait. From November to January 1991, the air wing participated in numerous multinational exercises and operated continuously in the Persian Gulf. At 2:00AM on 17 January 1991, Operation Desert Storm began as CVW-5 aircraft launched from the Midway. A-6E TRAM Intruder from VA-185 would become the first aircraft feet wet in the Gulf War. At around 4:00AM, three A-6E TRAM Intruders from VA-115 and VA-185 attacked Ahmad Al-Jaber Airbase in Kuwait with Mk.83 bombs. At the same time four Intruders attacked Shaibah Airbase in Southern Iraq, encountering heavy AAA fire. During these strikes, 17 other aircraft provided ECM, SEAD and Fighter support. For the next 43 days the air wing flew 3,383 combat sorties and expended more than four million pounds of ordnance.

=== 1990s ===
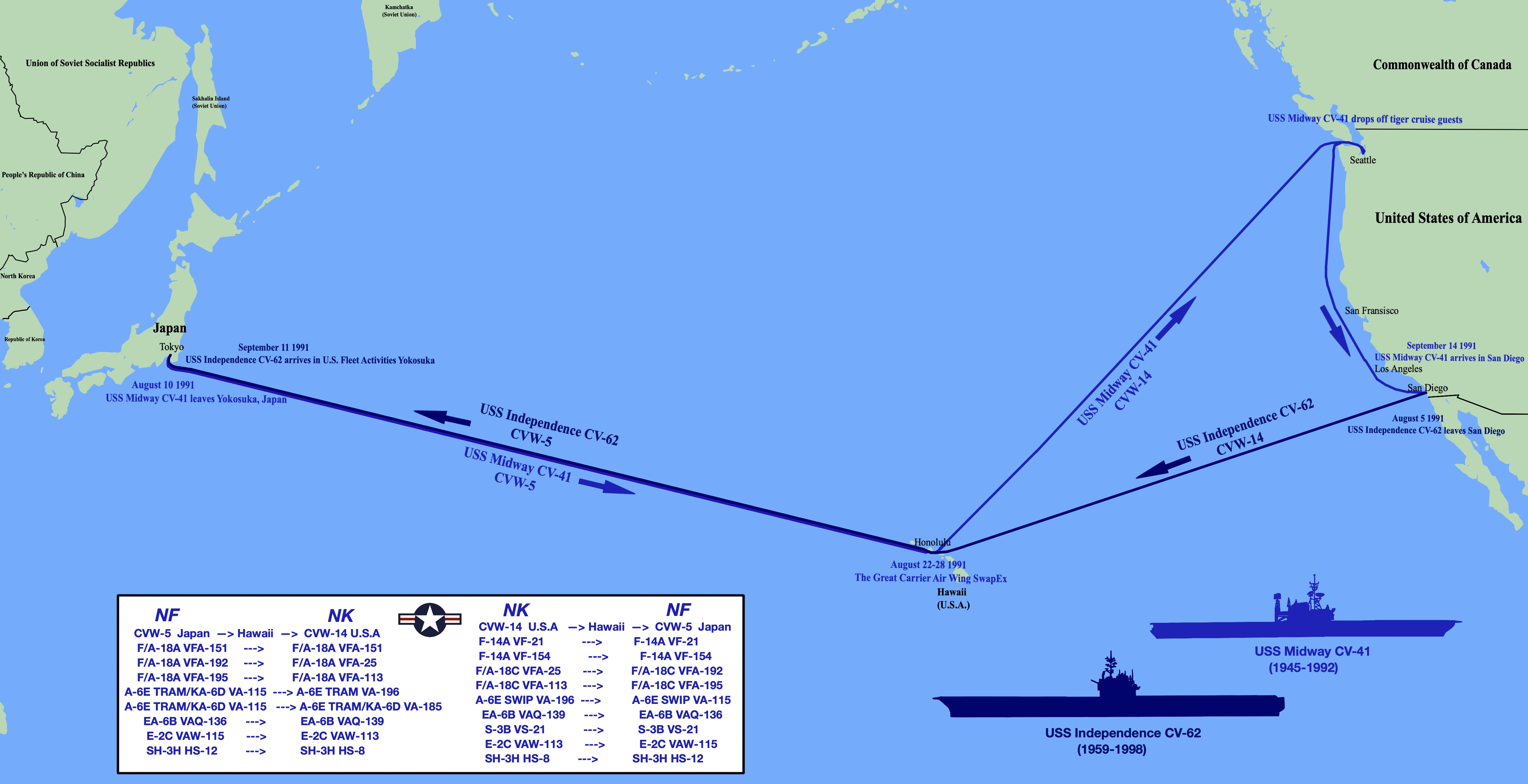
In August 1991, CVW-5 received new aircraft from CVW-14 as well as USS Midway and USS Independence swapping roles.

In August 1991, USS Independence replaced Midway. As part of the change, the Independence added the F-14 squadrons VF-21 and VF-154 (replacing VFA-151 which used the F/A-18A) as well as the S-3B Viking squadron VS-21. Also, in 1991, in consideration of the surrounding communities the Field Carrier Landing Practice (FCLP), known in Japan as NLP, was moved to the island of Iwo Jima, 650 miles (1,050 km) away as an interim measure until another landing field could be situated within 100 nautical miles (200 km) of the base.

USS Independence deployed to the Persian Gulf in mid-1992 and started the Southern Watch operation, a multi-national mission to monitor Iraqi compliance with the "no-fly zone" below the 32nd parallel north. CVW-5 and the Independence also took part in the 1994 North Korean nuclear Crisis. In August 1995, Independence and CVW-5 deployed to The Persian Gulf for a third time in support of Operation Southern Watch.

In July 1998, CVW-5 moved again, to USS Kitty Hawk. Kitty Hawk left its berth at Fleet Activities Yokosuka in early April 2000 to begin a routine deployment to the Western Pacific. The carrier had spent the previous five weeks in Yokosuka following a 12-day sea trial in February and March. She first journeyed to Guam to rendezvous with the air wing, which was participating in the Strike Fighter Advanced Readiness Program at Andersen Air Force Base until 18 April 2000. In addition to Guam, the ship made port calls throughout the Western Pacific and participated in exercise Cobra Gold with the Royal Thai Armed Forces.

=== 2000s ===
USS Kitty Hawk with CVW-5 got under way 1 October 2001 with a mere 24-hour turnaround, after an accelerated sea trials and carrier qualifications period, carried out on short notice following the events of 11 September. The air wing contingent included eight F/A-18 Hornet aircraft from VFA-192 and VFA-195 and pilots from VFA-27. Also in DET A were three S-3 Vikings from VS-21, and two SH-60 Seahawks from HS-14. The initial plan for CVW-5 was to provide air defense during the USS Kitty Hawk's transit to station. The Air Wing was able to work around the Special Operations mission, however, and established a more offensive mission for themselves. Air Wing aviators flew 600 missions over Afghanistan as part of the attacks, including more than 100 combat sorties during this at sea period.

At the same time, two C-2A Greyhounds from VRC-30 Detachment 5 were based at Naval Support Activity Bahrain providing logistical support to all four carriers on station, USS Kitty Hawk, USS Enterprise, USS Theodore Roosevelt, and USS Carl Vinson. The Providers from VRC-30's Detachment 5 were the only C-2A squadron in the region qualified for night operations. The Providers lived up to their name, supplying the four carrier battle groups with 1500 passengers and 350,000 pounds of cargo.

From 30 October through 16 November 2001, the strike element of the Air Wing participated in a weapons training detachment at Kadena Air Base in Okinawa. The Air Wing completed 50 sorties per day for the entire three-week period with a 98% sortie completion rate. In all there were 640 sorties flown for a total of 1,040 flight hours and over 250 tons of ordnance dropped. In spite of this rigorous training schedule, there were no mishaps or incidents of foreign object damage (FOD), and no liberty incidents. All this was done despite being uncoupled from the Air Wing's maintenance support, housed on the USS Kitty Hawk.

In 2003 was the final cruise with the F-14A Tomcat. CVW-5 deployed to the Persian Gulf and supported Operation Iraqi Freedom flying from USS Kitty Hawk. VF-154 Black Knights deployed several aircraft to Al Udeid in Qatar and supported Special Operations Forces in Iraq alongside the USAF and Royal Air Force aircraft deployed to that airbase. Later that year, VF-154 departed NAF Atsugi to transition to the F/A-18F Super Hornet, and VFA-27 transitioned to the F/A-18E Super Hornet while VFA-102 became part of CVW-5, flying the F/A-18F.

In August 2008, USS George Washington replaced USS Kitty Hawk as the U.S. Navy's forward deployed carrier and CVW-5 was reassigned to USS George Washington.

=== 2010s ===
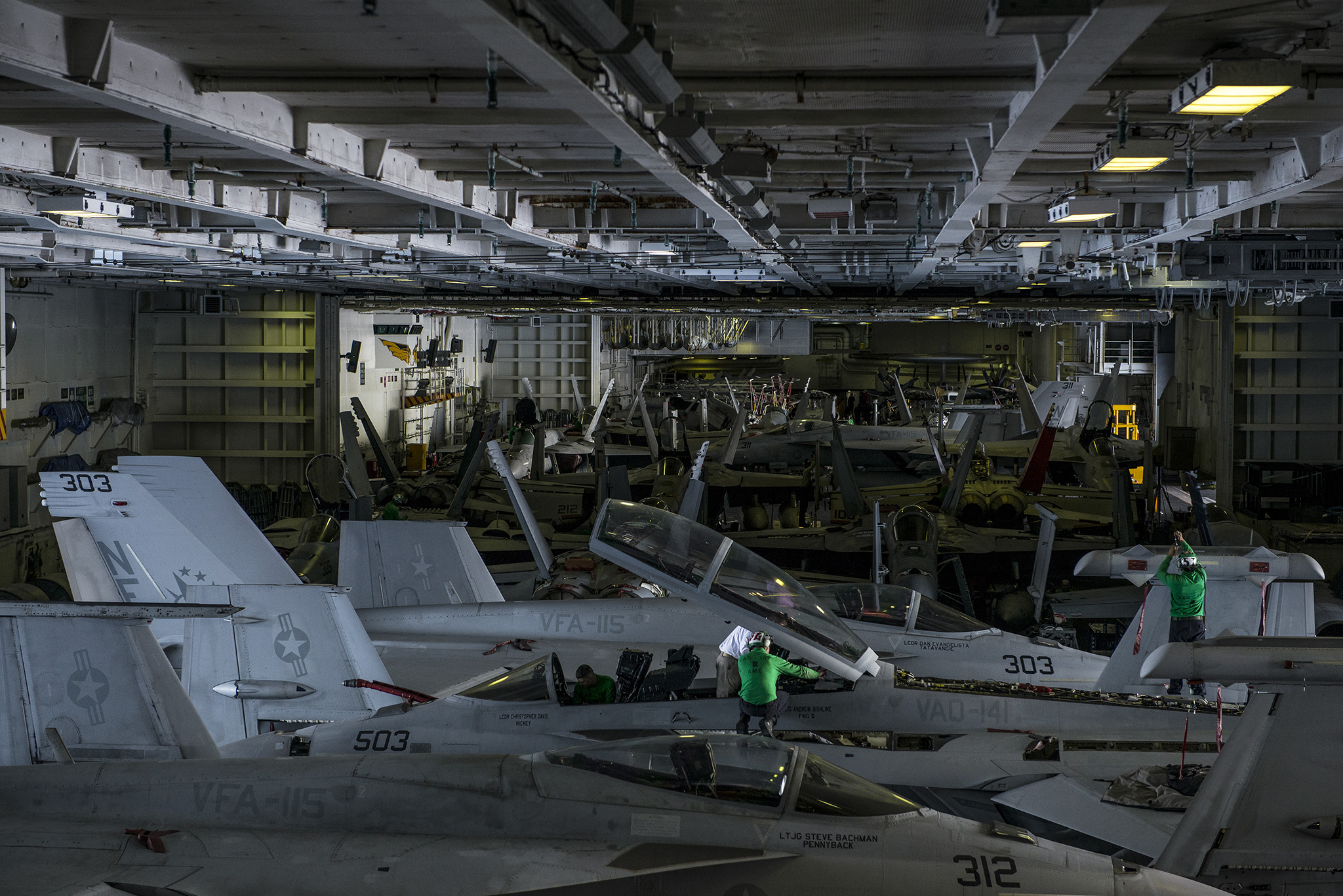
Aircraft of CVW-5 in the hangar bay of USS Ronald Reagan in September 2015.

In the 2010s, the wing's squadrons were modernized by the addition of new aircraft. During the fall of 2010, VFA-195 transitioned to the F/A-18E Super Hornet. In March 2012, VAQ-136 was replaced by VAQ-141, equipped with the EA-18G Growler. Thus, CVW-5 became the first U.S. Navy carrier air wing flying only variants of the F/A-18E/F Super Hornet as strike aircraft. In 2013, the wing's helicopter squadrons were replaced. The MH-60S Seahawk-equipped HSC-12 replaced HS-14, and HSL-51 was replaced by HSM-77, flying the MH-60R Seahawk.

On 14 January 2014, the U.S. Navy announced that USS Ronald Reagan would replace George Washington as the flagship of Carrier Strike Group Five. George Washington was scheduled to undergo its mid-life complex refueling and overhaul at Newport News Shipbuilding in Newport News, Virginia. Carrier Air Wing Five continued to be assigned to Carrier Strike Group Five. The hull swap was scheduled for 2015, and in August 2015, CVW-5 cross-decked to Ronald Reagan at San Diego.

In October 2015 Ronald Reagan and CVW-5 along with it moved to their new home base of Kanagawa Prefecture, Japan. The carrier was home-ported at Yokosuka and CVW-5 at Atsugi Naval Air Facility.

=== 2020s ===
In July 2024, VFA-147 and it's F-35Cs are expected to move to CVW-5 to replace VFA-115's F/A-18Es while VRM-30 Det. FDNF and it's CMV-22B Ospreys will replace VRC-30. As part of this move, CVW-5 will return to the George Washington for the first time in 9 years.

By April 2025, VFA-102 and VFA-27 have fully transitioned to the modernized Block III Super Hornets and VFA-147's F-35C's have fully integrated with the air wing. In May 2025, an F/A-18F from VFA-102 was seen carrying the advanced AIM-174B long-range missile. This makes CVW-5 one of the most advanced air wings in the US Navy.

== Current force ==
=== Fixed-wing aircraft ===
- F/A-18E/F Super Hornet
- F-35C Lightning II
- EA-18G Growler
- E-2D Hawkeye
- C-2A Greyhound

=== Rotary wing aircraft ===
- MH-60S Seahawk
- MH-60R Seahawk
