= VRM-30 =

US Navy aircraft squadron

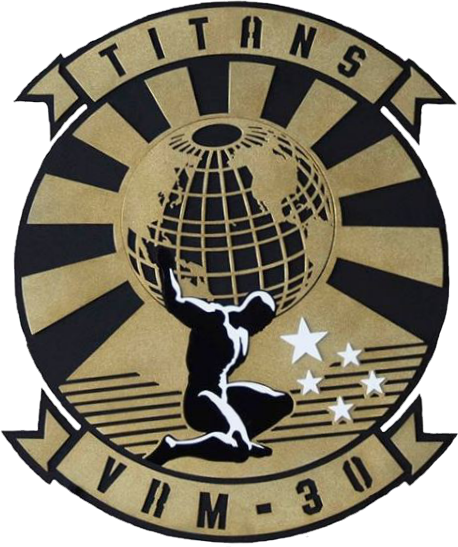
- Active: 14 December 2018 - present
- Country: United States
- Branch: United States Navy
- Type: Squadron
- Role: Fleet Logistics
- DC: Naval Air Station North Island
- Nickname: Titans
- Motto: Carry the Fleet!

Aircraft flown
- Transport: Bell Boeing CMV-22B Osprey

Fleet Logistics Multi-Mission Squadron 30 (VRM-30) is an aviation unit of the United States Navy.

== History ==
The squadron was established on 14 December 2018 at Naval Air Station North Island, California, but did not gain any aircraft until 22 June 2020. It is equipped with the CMV-22B, a carrier onboard delivery variant of the Bell Boeing V-22 Osprey which will eventually replace the Grumman C-2 Greyhound. The delivery of the Osprey made it the first U.S. Navy CMV-22B squadron.

The squadron deployed during 2021 aboard the USS Carl Vinson (CVN-70) as part of Carrier Air Wing Two to the Pacific Ocean.

On 15 July 2024, VRM-30 was forward deployed alongside Strike Fighter Squadron 147 (VFA-147) to Marine Corps Air Station Iwakuni, Japan.
