= VAQ-141 =

Electronic Attack Squadron 141
- VAQ-141 insignia
- Country: United States
- Branch: United States Navy
- Role: Airborne Electromagnetic Attack
- Part of: Carrier Air Wing Five
- Garrison/HQ: Marine Corps Air Station Iwakuni, Japan
- Nickname: Shadowhawks
- Engagements: Gulf War; Operation Provide Comfort; Operation Provide Promise; Operation Deny Flight; Operation Southern Watch; Operation Deliberate Force; Operation Allied Force; Operation Enduring Freedom; Operation Iraqi Freedom; Operation Epic Fury
- Decorations: Battle Efficiency "E", 2011; Battle Efficiency "E", 2012; Battle Efficiency "E", 2014; Battle Efficiency "E", 2015; Battle Efficiency "E", 2021

Commanders
- Current commander: Commander Jason Coates

Aircraft flown
- Attack: EA-6B Prowler; EA-18G Growler

Electromagnetic Attack Squadron 141 (VAQ-141), also known as the "Shadowhawks", is an EA-18G Growler squadron of the United States Navy that is based at Marine Corps Air Station Iwakuni, located in Iwakuni, Yamaguchi, Japan. VAQ-141 falls under the cognizance of Commander, Electromagnetic Attack Wing Pacific (COMVAQWINGPAC) and flies in support of Carrier Air Wing 5 (CVW-5) aboard the Nimitz-class aircraft carrier, USS George Washington (CVN-73).

== History ==
Electronic Attack Squadron One Four One (VAQ-141) was established in July 1987 at NAS Whidbey Island, Washington as the twelfth operational EA-6B Prowler squadron. Assigned to Carrier Air Wing EIGHT (CVW-8), the squadron embarked on board USS Theodore Roosevelt for her maiden cruise to the Mediterranean Sea in 1989.

=== Gulf War, the Balkans and Iraq ===
The squadron deployed in early 1991 on board the Roosevelt in support of Operation Desert Storm. VAQ-141 was the first CVW-8 squadron to deliver ordnance in that conflict, firing AGM-88 HARM missiles on the first night. Following hostilities, the Roosevelt and CVW-8 sailed back into the eastern Mediterranean and provided airborne protection for humanitarian relief efforts in northern Iraq as part of Operation Provide Comfort.

In 1993, VAQ-141 deployed again on board Roosevelt, this time to the Adriatic Sea in support of Operation Provide Promise humanitarian relief efforts and Operation Deny Flight no-fly zone enforcement over Bosnia-Herzegovina. Following numerous Deny Flight missions, the TR/CVW-8 team steamed into the Red Sea to support Operation Southern Watch, ensuring Iraqi compliance with post-Gulf War United Nations resolutions.

The squadron deployed once more with the Roosevelt Battle Group in March 1995, supporting Operation Southern Watch missions from the Red Sea and Persian Gulf. In June, the squadron flew ashore to Aviano Air Base, Italy to support Operation Deny Flight over Bosnia. During this period, VAQ-141 flew defense suppression cover for the successful Combat Search and Rescue (CSAR) effort for downed Air Force pilot Captain Scott O'Grady. Operation Deliberate Force began in late August and the squadron again provided Suppression Of Enemy Air Defense (SEAD) coverage for NATO airstrikes throughout Bosnia. The squadron returned home in September.

In 1996 VAQ-141 and CVW-8 embarked on board USS John F. Kennedy and made the first aircraft carrier visit to Dublin, Ireland. In April 1997 the squadron deployed on the Kennedy to the Mediterranean/Adriatic Seas and Persian Gulf, supporting Operation Deliberate Guard and Operation Southern Watch, respectively.

In 1999, the squadron and CVW-8 reunited with the Roosevelt, deploying in March to execute major combat operations over Serbia, Montenegro and Kosovo as part of the NATO bombing of Yugoslavia. During that intense 70-day conflict, the squadron distinguished themselves by not losing a single Coalition aircraft to enemy air defenses while a squadron jet was on station. Following Allied Force, the TR Battle Group steamed through the Suez Canal and began combat operations in support of Operation Southern Watch the following month, finally returning home in September 1999.

=== Afghanistan and Iraq ===
In April 2001, the squadron deployed as part of Carrier Air Wing 8 on board USS Enterprise. They participated in exercises in the Mediterranean Sea and North Sea and took part in enforcing the Iraqi no-fly zones as part of Operation Southern Watch. The squadron was on its way home when the September 11 attacks occurred. CVW-8's deployment was extended and they were sent to join other U.S. Navy assets in the northern Arabian Sea. Shortly thereafter, VAQ-141 provided electronic attack in support of coalition air and ground forces during the opening stages of the invasion of Afghanistan also known as Operation Enduring Freedom.

At the end of January 2003, just as USS Theodore Roosevelt finished its training exercises with VAQ-141 and CVW-8 on board, CVW-8 deployed to the Mediterranean 5 months early, to support VAQ-135 & CVW-11. In March, VAQ-141 provided support for the attack aircraft, leading the initial attacks on Baghdad in support of the Iraq War.

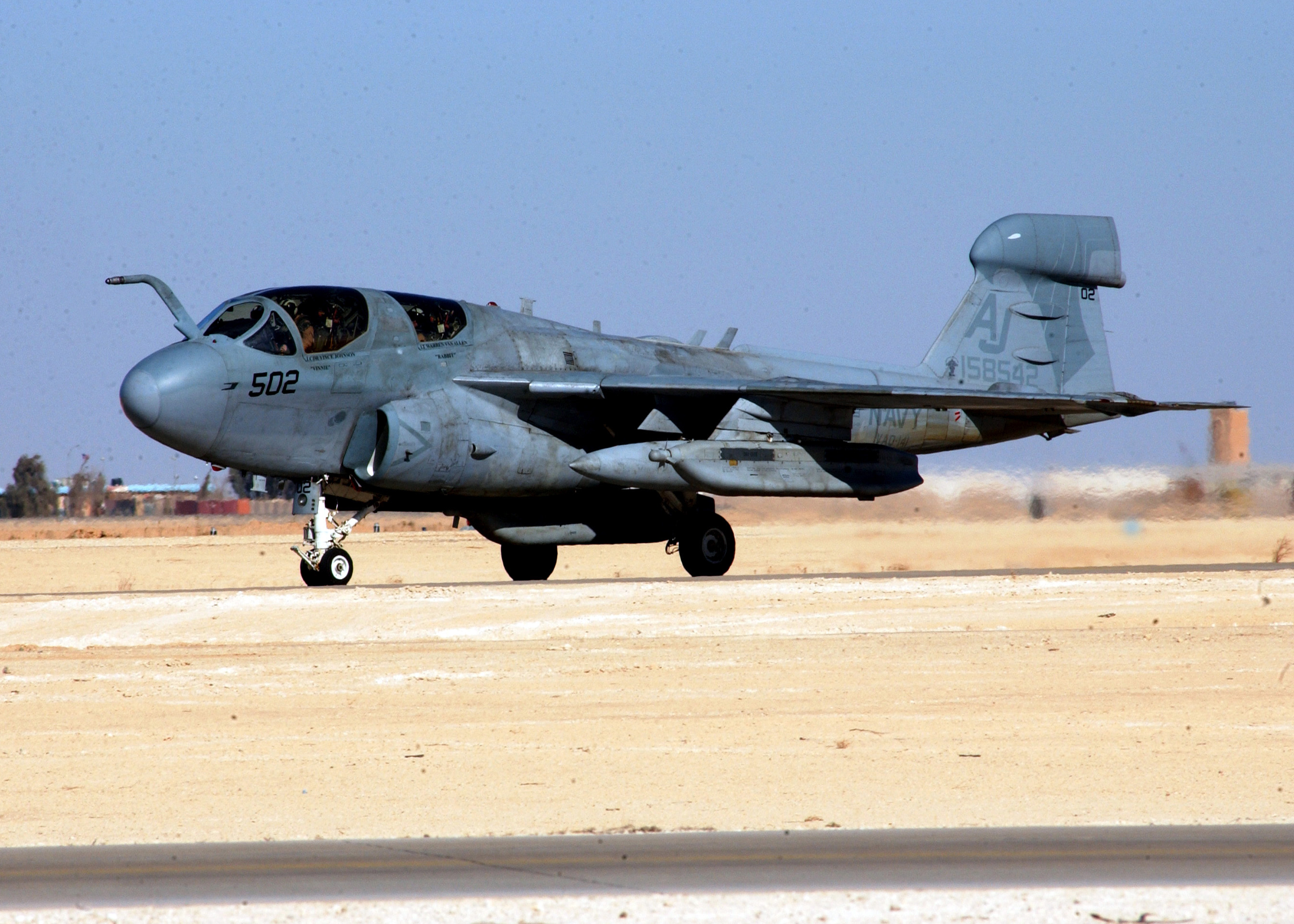
VAQ-141 EA-6B Prowler at Al Asad Air Base, Iraq in 2005

In September 2005, the squadron once again deployed with CVW-8 to the Persian Gulf in support of Operation Iraqi Freedom. While still in the Mediterranean 2 EA-6Bs and a detachment of support personnel from VAQ-141 left USS Theodore Roosevelt and flew to Al Asad Airbase, Iraq to augment VMAQ-1 to fill the void left by the previous carrier leaving the AOR. With this, VAQ-141 became the first EA-6B squadron to conduct split ship-shore operations in Iraq.

In September 2008 VAQ-141 departed Naval Station Norfolk aboard USS Theodore Roosevelt, steaming south to visit Cape Town South Africa, becoming the first nuclear-powered aircraft carrier to visit the port. The ship soon rounded the Cape of Good Hope and sailed north, Setting up station in the Northern Persian Gulf, flying missions in support of coalition forces in Afghanistan. In April 2009, VAQ-141 flew off the Roosevelt landing at NAS Whidbey Island for the last time as an EA-6B squadron.

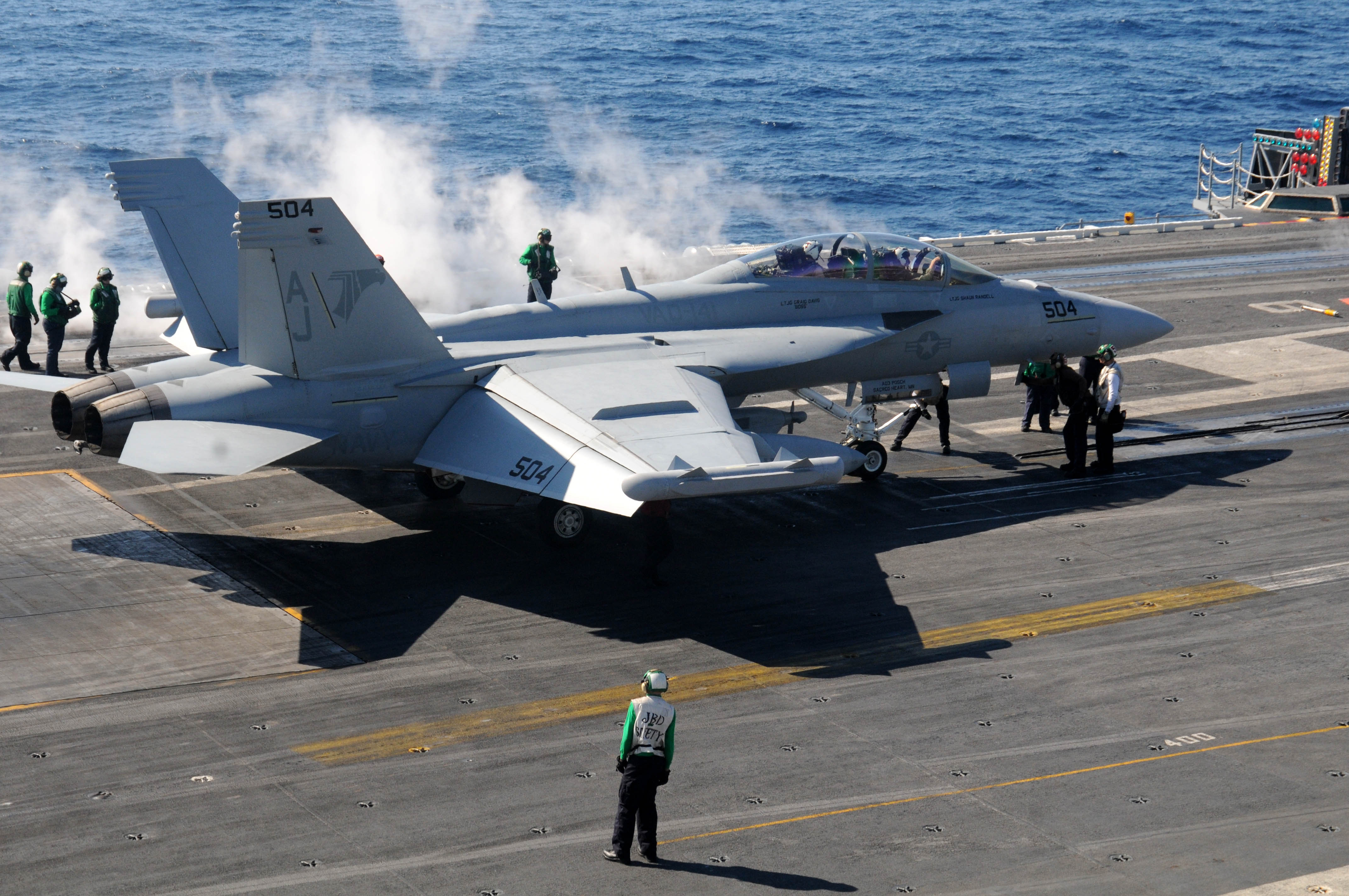
VAQ-141 EA-18G Growler on USS George H.W. Bush in 2011

On 12 February 2010, the squadron was deemed "safe for flight" with the EA-18G Growler, becoming the second operational squadron to transition to the aircraft.

In July 2011, the squadron deployed to the Middle East aboard USS George H.W. Bush. The squadron conducted the first ever combat operations of the EA-18G from sea, supporting both Operation New Dawn and Operation Enduring Freedom. During the deployment, the squadron's commanding officer, Commander Karl Pugh, was removed as CO after an "alcohol-related incident" in Bahrain.

=== Forward deployment to Japan ===
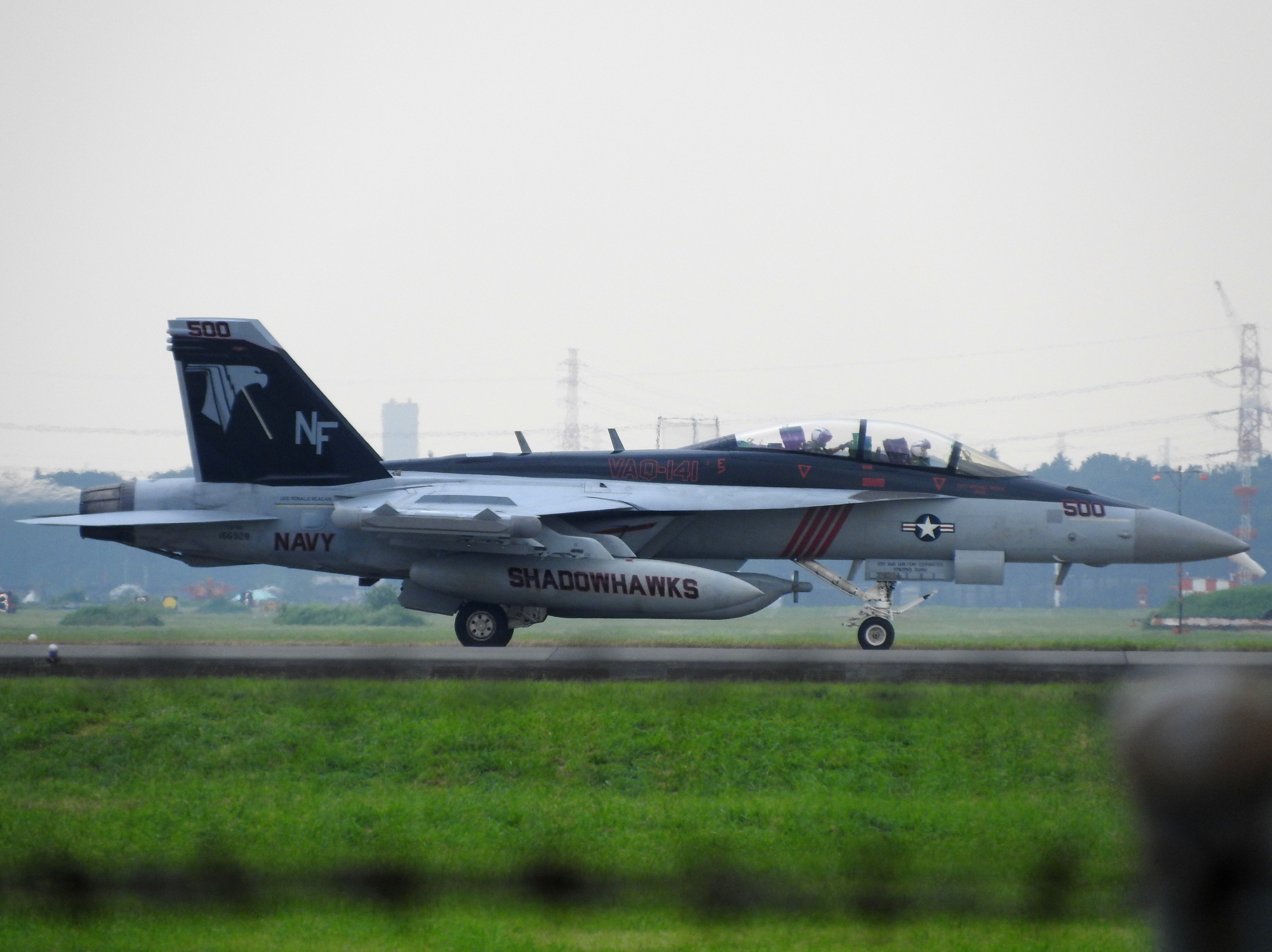
VAQ-141 EA-18G Growler in Japan at Naval Air Facility Atsugi

In February 2012, the Navy announced that VAQ-141 would be transferred to NAF Atsugi in the spring of 2012 to join Carrier Air Wing 5 and USS George Washington/Carrier Strike Group Five replacing VAQ-136.

In November 2013, USS George Washington in coordination with the 3rd Marine Expeditionary Brigade assisted the Philippine government in relief efforts in response to the aftermath of Super Typhoon Haiyan/Yolanda in the Republic of the Philippines.

In 2015 Carrier Air Wing Five cross-decked to USS Ronald Reagan, which replaced the George Washington as the forward-deployed carrier home-ported in Yokosuka. When the carrier is in port, the squadron is based nearby at Naval Air Facility Atsugi in Kanagawa Prefecture. It relocated to Marine Corps Air Station Iwakuni at Yamaguchi Prefecture in western Japan on 28 November after the conclusion of USS Ronald Reagan's fall patrol of 2017.

VAQ-141 is currently the largest and only permanently forward-deployed electronic attack squadron in the U.S. Navy.

In August 2026, VAQ-141 as part of CVW-5 onboard the USS George Washington arrived in the CENTCOM AOR. VAQ-141 and their E/A-18Gs then began undertaking combat missions against Iran within Operation Epic Fury

== See also ==
- History of the United States Navy
- List of United States Navy aircraft squadrons
