= VFA-27 =

Strike Fighter Squadron 27
- Active: 1 September 1967 - present
- Country: United States
- Branch: United States Navy
- Type: Fighter/Attack
- Role: Close air support Air interdiction Aerial reconnaissance
- Part of: Carrier Air Wing Five
- Garrison/HQ: MCAS Iwakuni
- Nickname: Royal Maces
- Engagements: Vietnam War; Operation Eagle Claw; Operation Earnest Will; Operation Restore Hope; Operation Southern Watch; *January 1993 airstrikes on Iraq; 1994 North Korean nuclear crisis Operation Enduring Freedom; Iraq War; Operation Epic Fury

Aircraft flown
- Attack: A-7 Corsair II
- Fighter: F/A-18A/C (N) Hornet; F/A-18E Super Hornet

Strike Fighter Squadron 27 (VFA-27), also known as the "Royal Maces", are a United States Navy F/A-18E Super Hornet fighter squadron stationed at Marine Corps Air Station Iwakuni. They are a part of Carrier Air Wing 5 and are attached to the aircraft carrier USS George Washington. Their radio callsign is Mace and the squadron's tail code is NF.

== Mission ==
The squadron conducts carrier-based air strike and strike force escort missions, anti-ship operations, battle group anti-air operations, and surveillance/intelligence collection operations in support of Carrier Air Wing 5 tasking and requirements. The squadron is permanently forward deployed with Carrier Air Wing 5, shore based at MCAS Iwakuni.

== History ==
=== 1960s ===
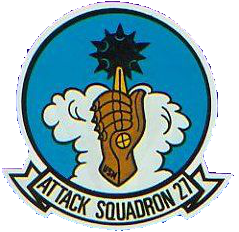
VA-27's original insignia.

The squadron was commissioned Attack Squadron 27 (VA-27) on 1 September 1967 flying the A-7 Corsair II, and in January 1968, the squadron officially reported to Carrier Air Wing 14. In May 1968, as the Vietnam War continued, they departed for their first combat deployment aboard USS Constellation. On 28 June 1968, the squadron flew its first combat sortie, striking targets in the panhandle region of North Vietnam.

The squadron's insignia was approved by the Chief of Naval Operations on 25 March 1968, and consisted of a light blue glove and black mace. They were nicknamed the Royal Maces.

During a second combat cruise aboard Constellation in August 1969, VA-27 flew over 2,500 combat sorties.

=== 1970s ===
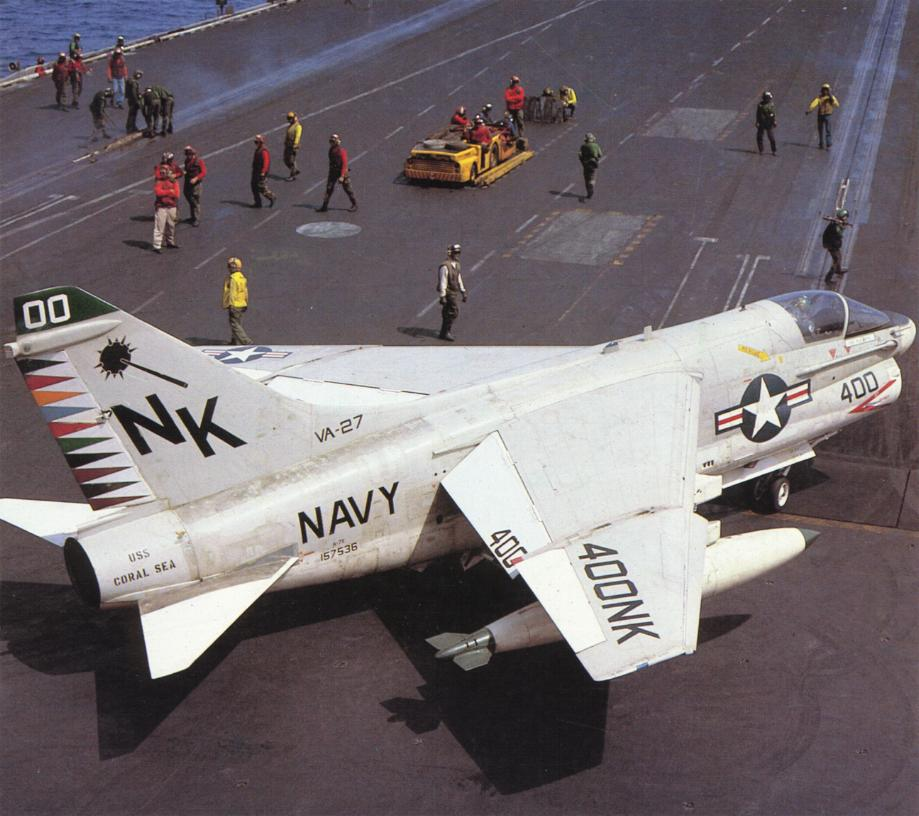
VA-27 A-7E CAG bird of CVW-14 based on USS Coral Sea in 1980

VA-27 transitioned to the newer A-7E on 20 June 1970. From 4 February to 7 March, VA-27 embarked on USS Enterprise during the carrier's transit around Cape Horn to her new home port in NAS Alameda, California, and then deployed on Enterprise from 11 June 1971 to 12 February 1972, the squadron made its third combat cruise. With the outbreak of the Indo-Pakistani War of 1971 in December 1971, Enterprise departed Yankee Station and made a quick transit to the Indian Ocean to provide support for the evacuation of foreign civilians. Squadron pilots amassed over 4,400 combat flight hours and participated in over 1,500 air strikes over Indochina without loss.

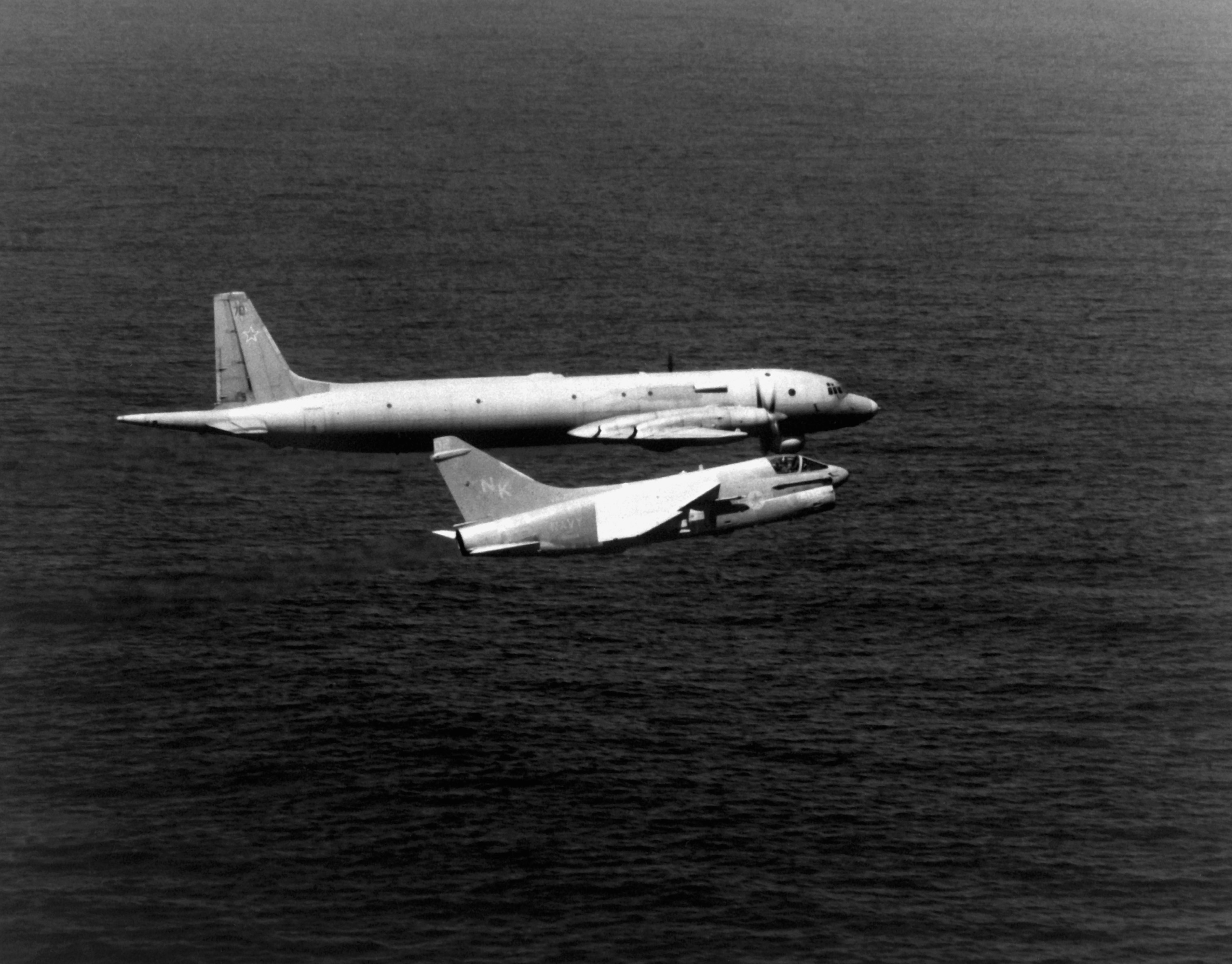
A VA-27 A-7E intercepts a Soviet Il-38 in 1981

The squadron commenced their fourth combat deployment in September 1972 aboard Enterprise, participating in Linebacker I and Linebacker II operations, heavy air strikes against targets in North Vietnam to interdict the flow of supplies in that country and into South Vietnam. The squadron began its next deployment to the Western Pacific in September 1974. In April 1975, the squadron flew surveillance missions over Vietnam and flew escort for United States Marine Corps and United States Air Force helicopters during Operation Frequent Wind, the evacuation of American and Vietnamese personnel from Saigon

=== 1980s ===
In April 1980, VA-27 participated in the Iranian hostage rescue attempt by providing air cover for the forces directly involved in the rescue operation.

In August 1986, the squadron participated in the first carrier tactical flight operations in the Bering Sea since the end of World War II.

USS Carl Vinson and CVW-15, with VA-27 attached, departed for the ship's fourth overseas deployment on 15 June 1988. While on station, the carrier supported Operation Earnest Will, the escort of U.S. flagged tankers in the Persian Gulf.

=== 1990s ===
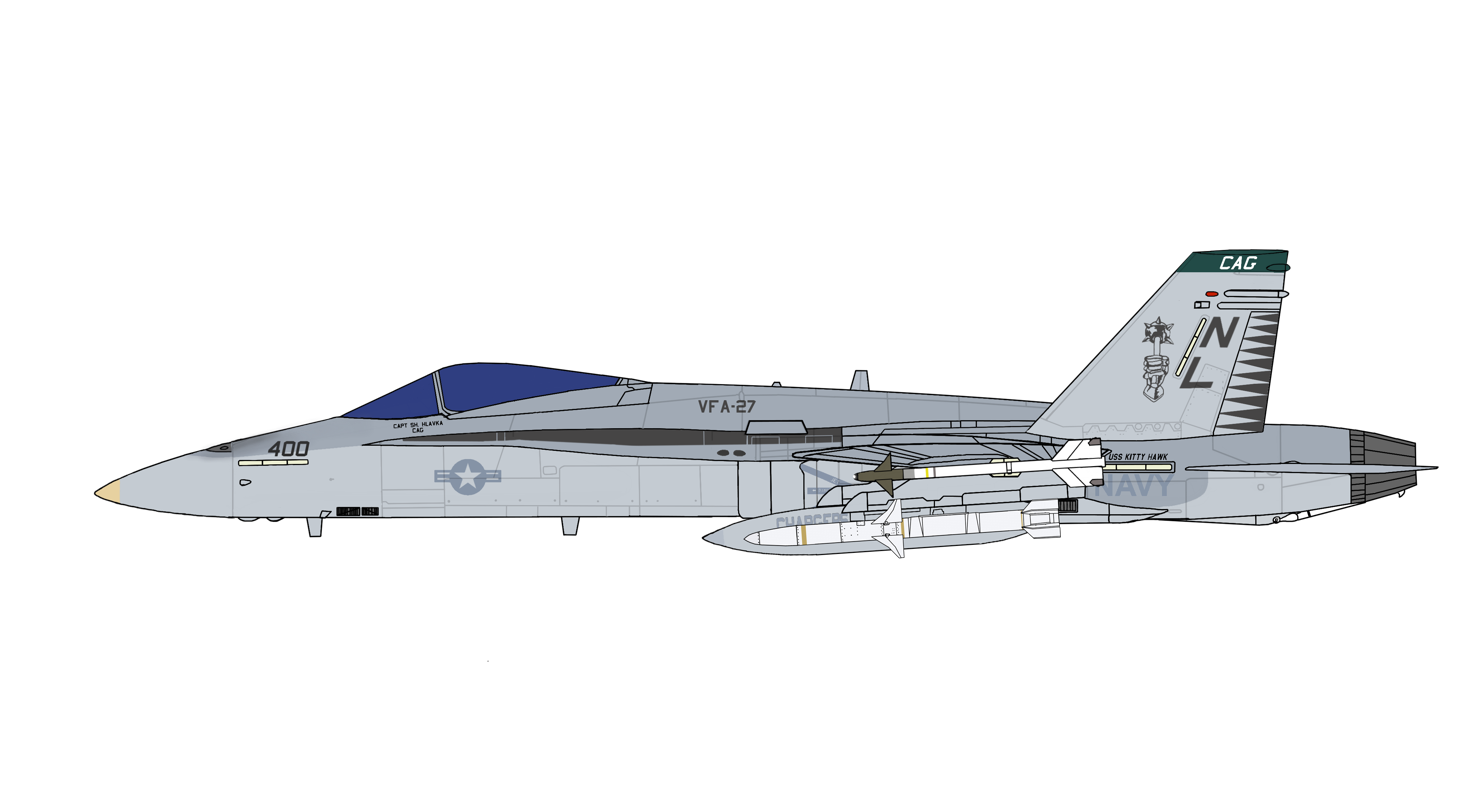
BuNo 162906 as NL-400, the CAG Bird of VFA-27 Chargers during its 1994 deployment to the Korean Peninsula.

While stationed at Naval Air Station Lemoore, California the squadron transitioned to the F/A-18A Hornet on 24 January 1991 and were officially re-designated Strike Fighter Squadron 27 (VFA-27). The squadron also changed roles as well as aircraft and were now a fighter/attack squadron, performing air-to-air as well as air-to-ground attack missions. The Squadron emblem was also changed to a green background, white cloud, and silver gauntlet with silver mace.

In November 1992, while deployed aboard USS Kitty Hawk, VFA-27 operated off the coast of Somalia in support of Operation Restore Hope and augmented United States Central Command’s multi-national coalition Air Forces supporting Operation Southern Watch. The squadron participated in a coalition night strike against Iraq on 13 January 1993, delivering over 18,000 pounds of ordnance on target. In 1994 VFA-27 deployed aboard USS Kitty Hawk to the Sea of Japan. In 1996 the squadron commenced their homeport change from NAS Lemoore to NAF Atsugi, Japan deploying aboard USS Independence.

=== 2000s ===
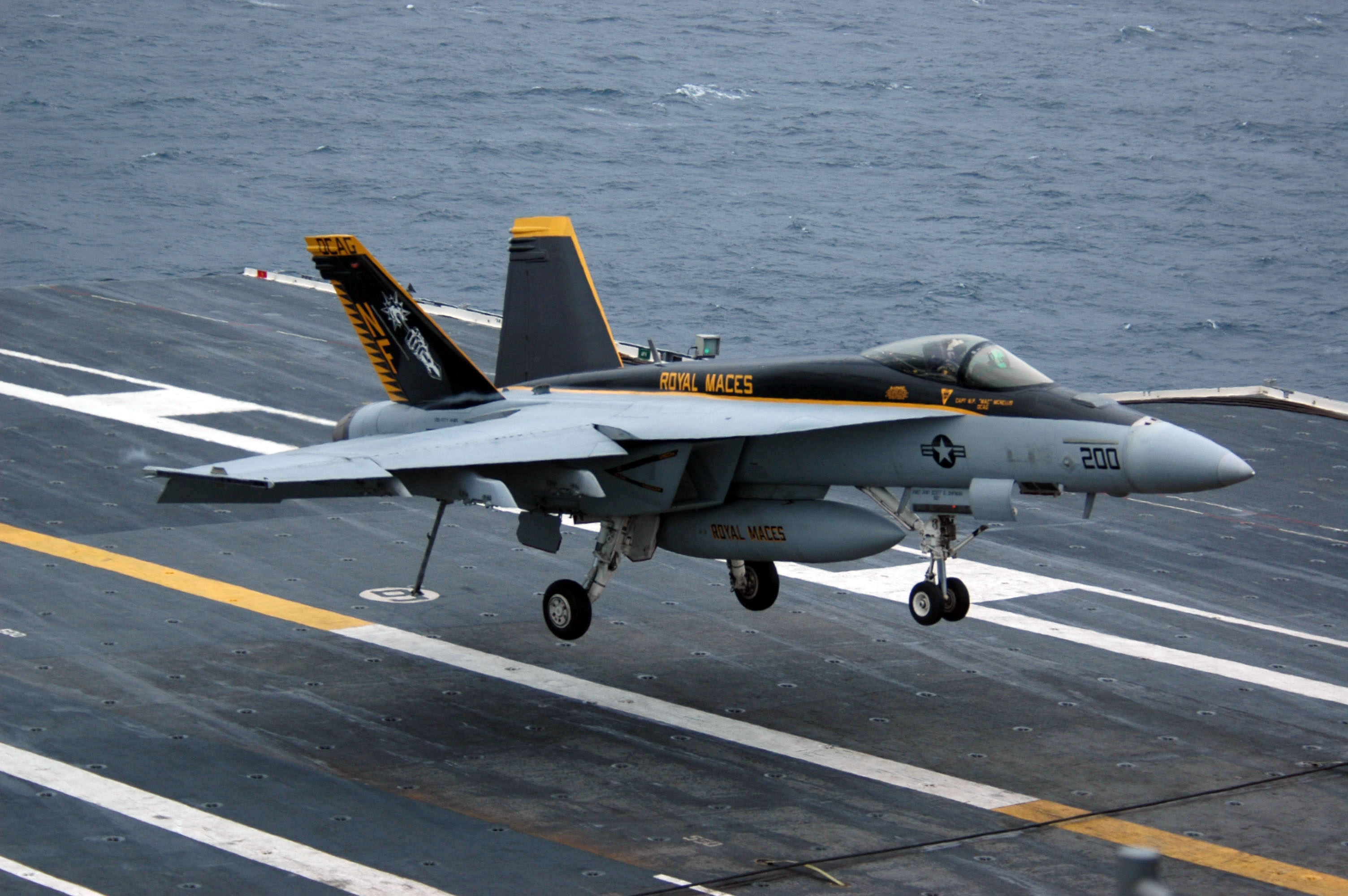
VFA-27 F/A-18E lands on USS Kitty Hawk in 2006

In the wake of the September 11 attacks, the squadron participated in Operation Enduring Freedom flying missions against the Al Qaeda infrastructure and Taliban forces in Afghanistan as well as protecting assets in Diego Garcia. When Kitty Hawk deployed to the Persian Gulf in support of Operation Iraqi Freedom, VFA-27 was soon heavily involved in combat. As part of Carrier Air Wing 5, VFA-27 attacked command, control and communications sites, surface-to-surface missile batteries and an air traffic control radar near Basrah. At the Al Faw peninsula long range artillery guns and 155mm howitzers near Az Zubayr were targeted. The squadron flew hundreds of close air support and strike sorties against Iraqi forces. VFA-27 completed their transition to the F/A-18E Super Hornet in October 2004 at NAS Lemoore.

In February of 2013, the Royal Maces executed a trans-Pacific journey to accept new Lot 34 and 35 F/A-18E Super Hornets to maintain their superior technological abilities in the U.S. Navy's Pacific Fleet. In February of 2015, the squadron's tactical prowess was recognized by their being awarded the COMNAVAIRPAC Battle "E", highlighted by their "training and operational achievements" and the viral teaser of their full-length cruise video "Shoot 'em if you got 'em", which was received with wide acclaim, and has been sampled in several U.S. Navy recruiting advertisements as well as has been added to the National Archives as a piece of Naval Heritage having garnered over 3,000,000 views on Youtube.com since its initial publication as well as untold numbers of views across numerous ancillary internet sites, although the original video has since been made private.

In March of 2025, VFA-27's F/A-18E Block II Super Hornets were replaced with modernized Block III F/A-18E's.

In August 2026, VFA-27 as part of CVW-5 onboard the USS George Washington arrived in the CENTCOM AOR. VFA-27 and their F/A-18Es then began undertaking combat missions against Iran within Operation Epic Fury.

== External links and reference ==
- VFA-27's Official Webpage
- Royal Maces' Unofficial Page
- Shoot em if you got em. the VFA-27 cruise video
- Tony Holmes (2005). US Navy Hornet Units of Operation Iraqi Freedom Part One, Osprey Publishing Limited.

== See also ==
- Naval aviation
- List of United States Navy aircraft squadrons
- List of Inactive United States Navy aircraft squadrons
