= HSC-12 =

Helicopter Sea Combat Squadron 12
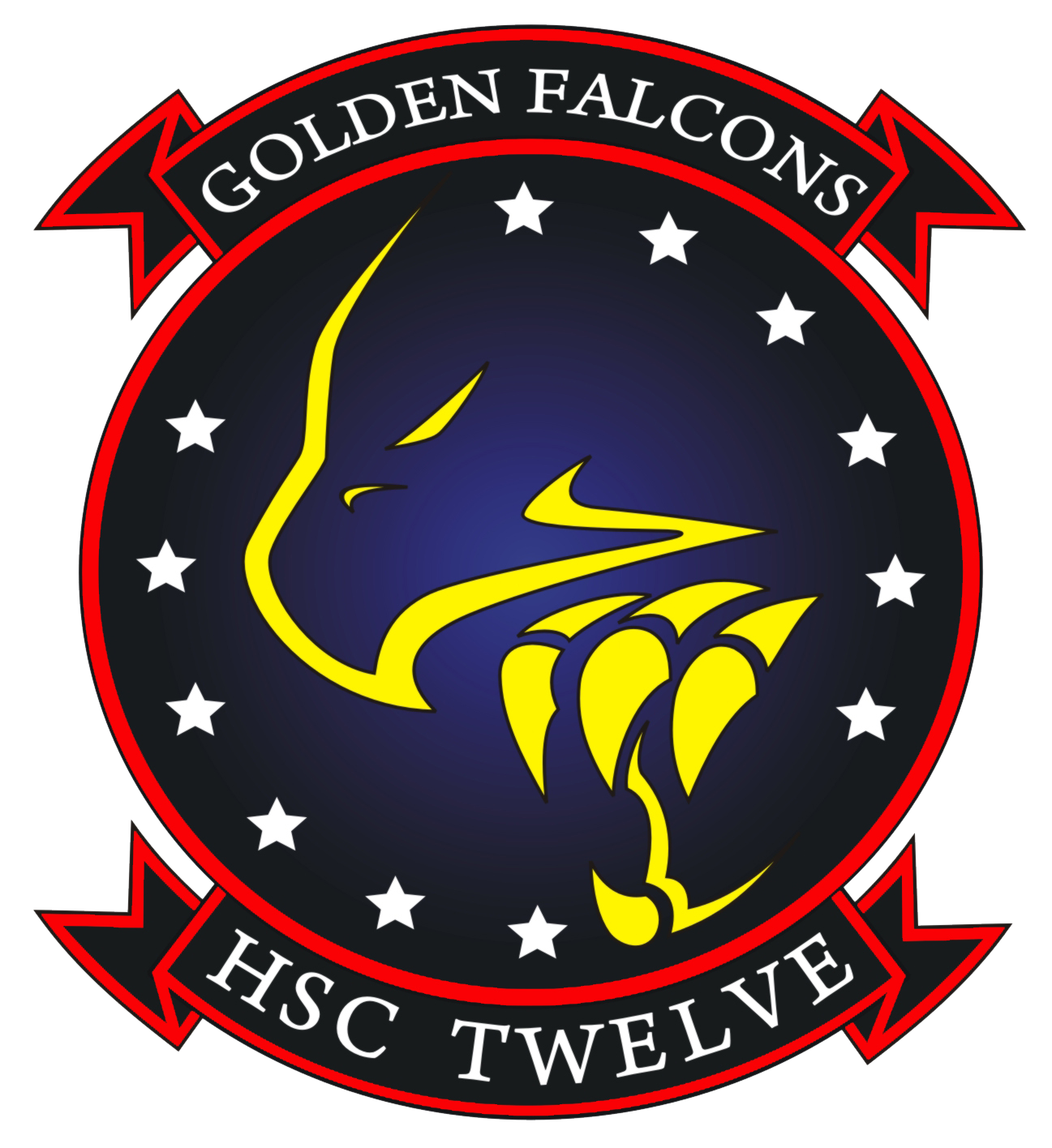
- HSC-12 Golden Falcons insignia
- Active: 7 March 1952 - present
- Country: United States of America
- Branch: United States Navy
- Type: Helicopter Squadron
- Size: 239+ Personnel
- Part of: CVW-5
- Garrison/HQ: NAF Atsugi
- Nickname: "World Famous Golden Falcons"
- Engagements: Vietnam War

Commanders
- Current commander: Commander P. J. Keuss
- Current Executive Officer: Commander D. P. Stahl

Helicopter Sea Combat Squadron 12 (HSC-12) Golden Falcons is a United States Navy helicopter squadron formerly designated HS-2, based at Naval Air Facility Atsugi, in Japan. They are attached to Carrier Air Wing Five with the aircraft carrier USS George Washington.

In early 2009, HS-2 Golden Falcons transitioned to the MH-60S Seahawk and were re-designated HSC-12.

== Command History ==
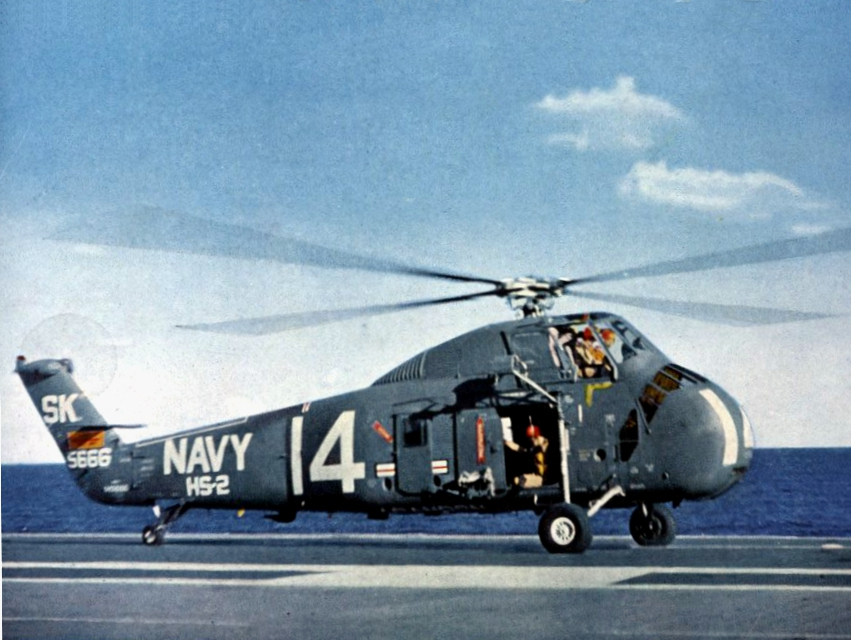
HS-2 HSS-1 on USS Yorktown, 1959.

Helicopter Anti-Submarine Squadron TWO was established on 7 March 1952 making it the oldest currently active operational Navy helicopter squadron (only Helicopter Training Squadron EIGHT (HT-8) is older). It was the first Anti-Submarine Warfare (ASW) helicopter squadron on the West Coast, flying the HO4S-3 Chickasaw. Initially used in small detachments, the first deployment as an entire squadron was made in 1957 by which time the squadron was flying the HSS-1 Seabat, embarked aboard the aircraft carrier USS Philippine Sea. At this time, the squadron was manned by 258 enlisted and 39 officers to fly and maintain 17 aircraft. Since that time, the squadron has deployed in ten other carriers and is currently with Carrier Air Wing Five (CVW-5) aboard USS Ronald Reagan (CVN-76) with 190 enlisted, 22 officers and eight MH-60S Seahawk helicopters.

=== 1960s ===
By 1960, the squadron had transitioned into the autopilot equipped HSS-1N version of the Seabat giving it the ability to operate at night and in marginal weather. In addition to being the first HS squadron on the West Coast, by 1962 HS-2 was the first ASW helicopter squadron to make a deployment with the Navy's first turbine powered all-weather ASW helicopter, the HSS-2 Sea King which in September 1962 in compliance with the 1962 United States Tri-Service aircraft designation system was re-designated the SH-3A Sea King. HS-2 was also the first H-3 squadron to operationally employ Helicopter In-flight Refueling (HIFR) at night. In November 1965, an HS-2 SH-3A performed the longest operational flight at the time. The aircraft remained airborne for eleven hours and eighteen minutes on a search and rescue mission in North Vietnam with the help of four HIFRs three of which were at night. This flight was also the first night rescue in North Vietnam.

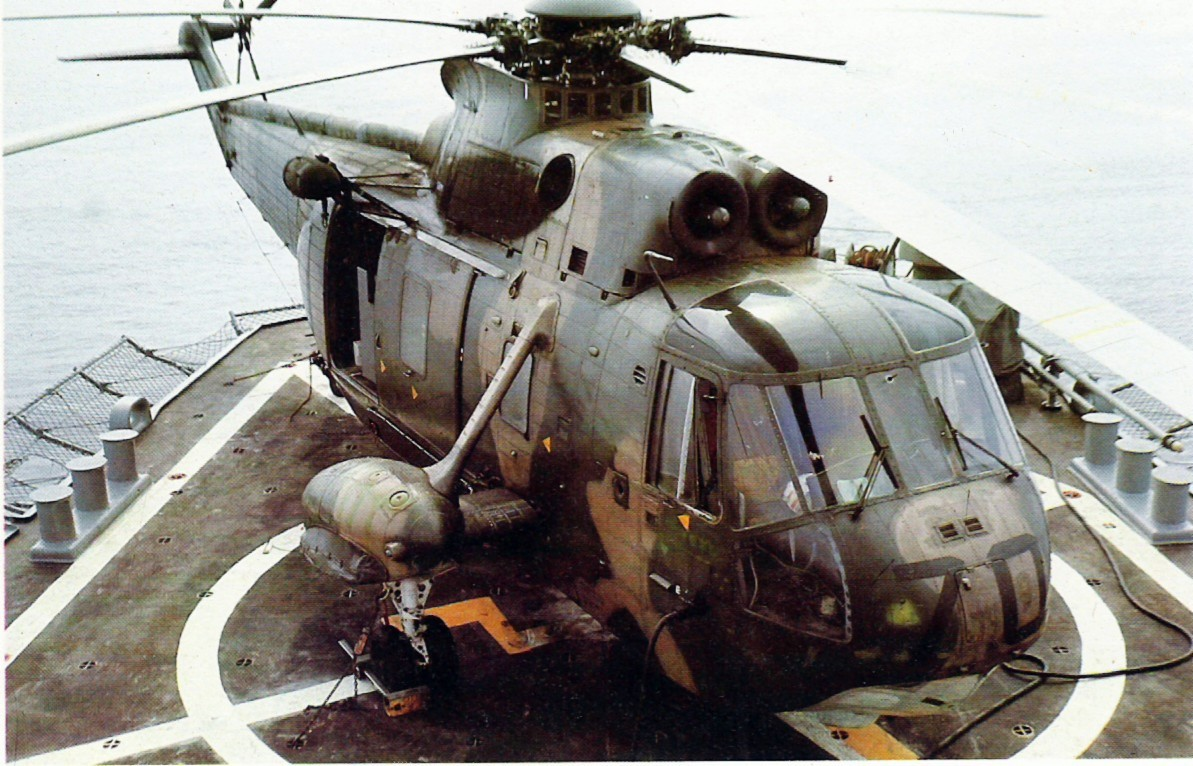
HS-2 SH-3A on USS Mahan in the Gulf of Tonkin, 1967

Other technical innovations by the squadron include the pioneering of submarine detection capabilities with the introduction of the SH-3D Sea King in 1967 as a multi-sensor ASW platform. In addition to the Bendix AQS-13B sonar, Magnetic Anomaly Detector (MAD) and Multi-Channel Jezebel Relay (MCJR) active sonobuoy systems were added to the aircraft, the latter providing the carrier with sonobuoy monitoring capability.

HS-2 performed the first night rescue in North Vietnam in 1965. In 1966 HS-2 participated in the Apollo Saturn AS-202 spaceshot recovery program, and was responsible for ten overland and five coastal rescues of pilots in North Vietnam during 1967. The squadron provided relief support to snowbound Indians in Arizona over the Christmas holidays of 1967, airlifting fifteen tons of food supplies, flying 292 mercy missions and performing 37 medical evacuations.

While deployed in USS Hornet to Yankee Station, the squadron earned the following awards:Armed Forces Expeditionary Medal: Korea April 1969 Task Force 71; U.S. Navy Meritorious Unit Commendation Viet Nam – Task Force 71 1968–69; Republic of Vietnam Campaign Medal 1968–69; Vietnam Service Medal; Two Bronze Campaign Stars: Vietnam Counteroffensive, Phase VI from 1968-11-02 to 1969 02–22 Tet 1969 Counteroffensive from 1969-02-23 to 1969-06-08

=== 1970s-1980s ===
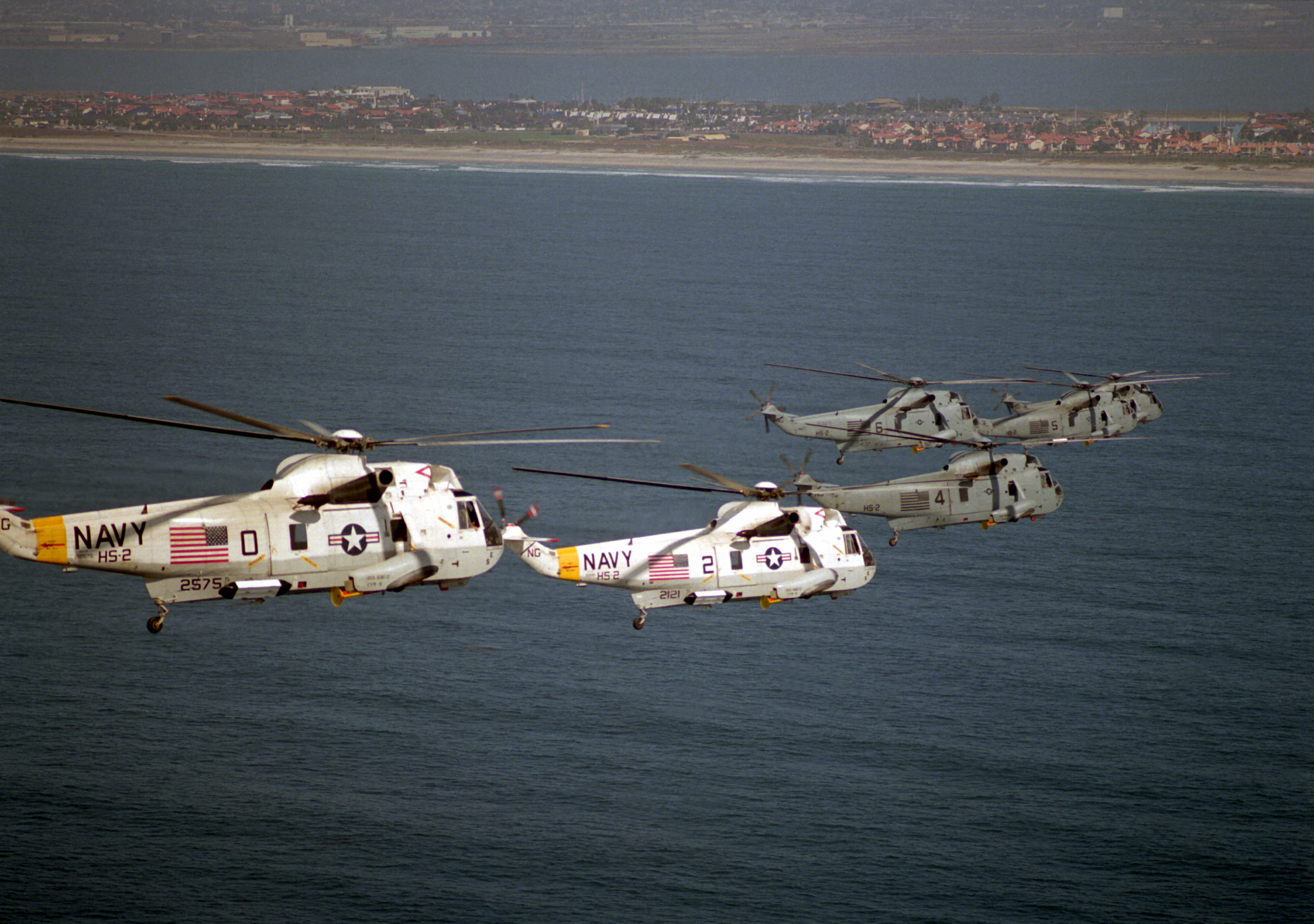
HS-2 SH-3Hs returning from a deployment aboard USS Nimitz (CVN-68), 1989.

In 1970, HS-2 was the first helicopter squadron to travel across the United States for deployment in a ship from the other coast. In that year, the squadron participated in operations with U.S. Forces responding to the Jordanian Crisis. During this deployment the American flag was painted on the helicopters so they could be distinguished from the Israeli H-3s, which might also be operating in the combat zone. To commemorate the event, the Chief of Naval Operations authorized the American flag to become a permanent part of HS-2's paint scheme. As a result of its superior performance during that period, the squadron was awarded the Navy Unit Commendation.

Following the Paris Peace Accords in 1973, HS-2 became the first U.S. Naval air unit to fly into North Vietnam, providing transportation to and from Haiphong for the negotiating team. In 1974 the squadron provided relief assistance to the cyclone-devastated island of Mauritius.

The 1976 deployment aboard USS Enterprise was the first Western Pacific deployment for the Navy's modern CV concept. Along with the S-3A Viking and an onboard Tactical Support Center (TSC), HS-2 contributed to the refinement and success of modern-day ASW tactics. In late 1979, HS-2 was chosen to participate in amphibious operations with a multi-nation task force. The squadron deployed aboard USS New Orleans and again proved the value of helicopter ASW. In 1980 the squadron became the first West Coast unit to deploy with new tactical navigation (TACNAV) equipped SH-3H Sea King helicopters. Also in 1980, HS-2 earned the Humanitarian Service Medal for its participation in the rescue of three groups of Vietnamese boat people. In 1984, HS-2 provided the first damage assessments following the collision of a Soviet Victor-class submarine with USS Kitty Hawk.

=== 1990s ===
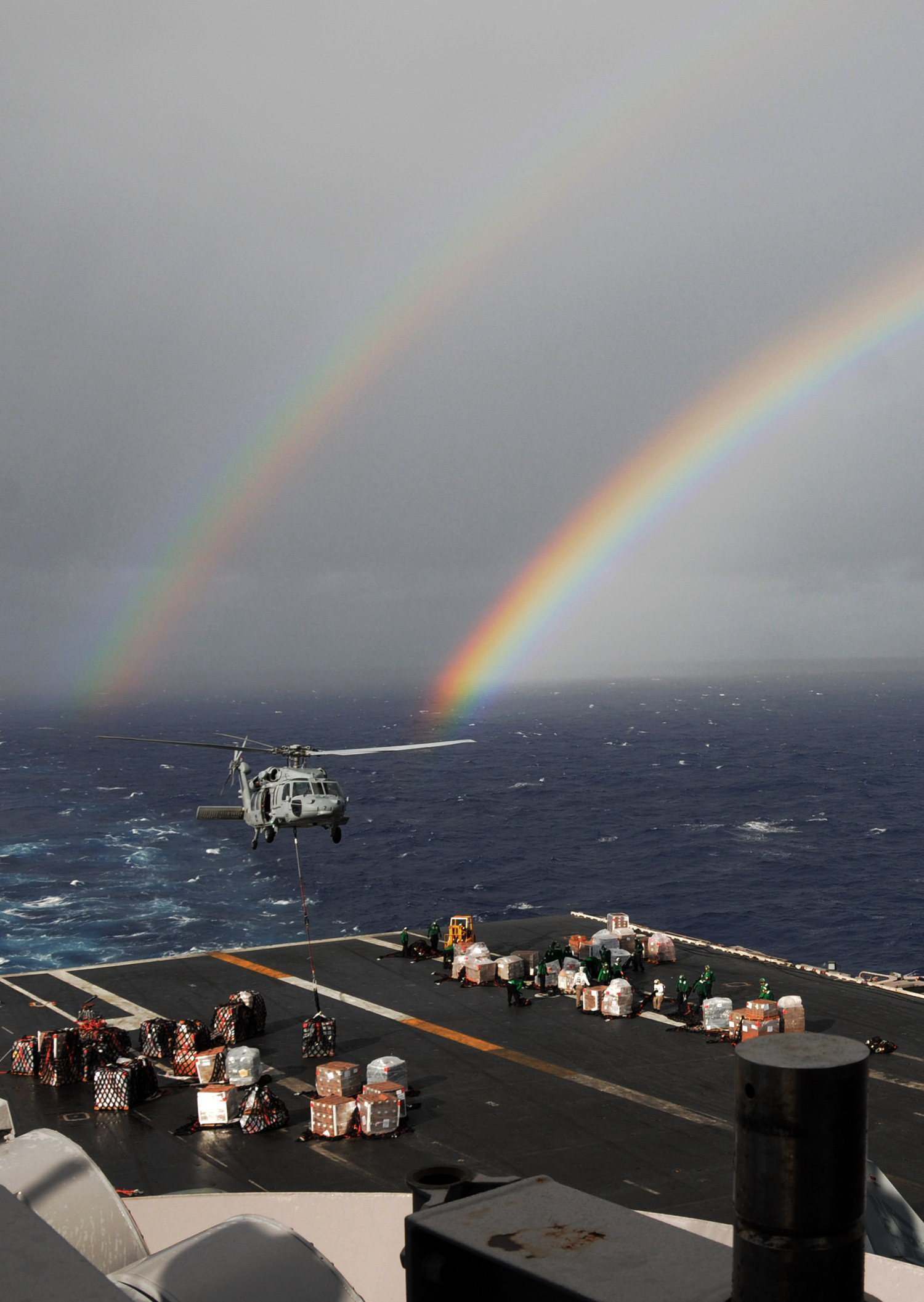
An HSC-12 MH-60S delivers cargo to USS Abraham Lincoln, December 2011.

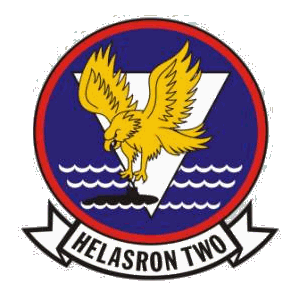
Squadron insignia during period of designation as HS-2

In 1990 HS-2 transitioned from the SH-3H to the SH-60F Seahawk and the HH-60H Seahawk. HS-2 was the first active duty HS squadron to fully incorporate the Combat Search and Rescue mission, having received the two new HH-60H aircraft in November of that year. Additionally, HS-2 was the first HS squadron to deploy with the FLIR/Hellfire weapons system.

=== 2000s ===
Assigned to Carrier Airwing TWO aboard USS Abraham Lincoln in 2005, the squadron provided relief support to the citizens of Indonesia devastated by a tsunami on 26 December 2004. Flying the SH-60F and HH-60H the squadron conducted 231 medevacs of displaced refugees, moved 475,000 lbs of disaster relief cargo, and flew 1010.9 hours in a 31-day period. 10,000 lives were saved in the first ten days.

On 6 August 2009, the squadron completed its transition from the SH-60F and HH-60H to the MH-60S Seahawk helicopter and was re-designated HSC-12 ending its long history as Anti-Submarine Squadron. As a Helicopter Sea Combat Squadron, HSC-12's missions are now Anti-Surface Warfare, Search and Rescue, Combat Search and Rescue, Naval Special Warfare Support, and Vertical Replenishment. After the transition and re-designation, HSC-12 was reassigned from CVW-2 to Carrier Air Wing Five (CVW-5) based aboard Naval Air Facility Atsugi in Kanagawa Prefecture, Japan. It now deploys aboard USS Ronald Reagan (CVN-76).

In August 2026, HSC-12 as part of CVW-5 onboard the USS George Washington arrived in the CENTCOM AOR. HSC-12 and their MH-60S helicopters then began undertaking combat missions against Iran within Operation Epic Fury

== See also ==
- History of the United States Navy
- List of United States Navy aircraft squadrons
