= VFA-147 =

Strike Fighter Squadron 147
- Active: 1 February 1967 – Present
- Country: United States
- Branch: United States Navy
- Type: Fighter/Attack
- Role: Close air support Air interdiction Aerial reconnaissance
- Part of: Carrier Air Wing Five
- Garrison/HQ: MCAS Iwakuni
- Nickname: "Argonauts"
- Engagements: Vietnam War; 1969 EC-121 shootdown incident Operation Earnest Will; Gulf War; Operation Southern Watch; 1996 Taiwan Strait Crisis; Operation Enduring Freedom; Iraq War; Iraqi Civil War; Operation Epic Fury

Commanders
- Commanding Officer: CDR Michael J. Austin
- Executive Officer: CDR Andre A. Webb
- CMDCM: CMDCM Danderrick "Sonny" Ocampo

Aircraft flown
- Attack: A-7A/E Corsair II
- Fighter: F/A-18C Hornet; F/A-18E Super Hornet; F-35C Lightning II

Strike Fighter Squadron 147 (VFA-147), also known as the "Argonauts," is a United States Navy strike fighter squadron based at MCAS Iwaukuni, Japan. VFA-147 was established on 1 February 1967 and flies the F-35C Lightning II, as the first non-training F-35C squadron in the U.S. Navy and the first forward-deployed F-35C squadron as a member of CVW-5.

== Squadron Insignia and Nickname ==
The Squadron's insignia was approved by Chief of Naval Operations on 30 June 1967. The Squadron is named after Jason and the Argonauts, a band of heroes in Greek mythology. The squadron's callsign is Jason.

== History ==
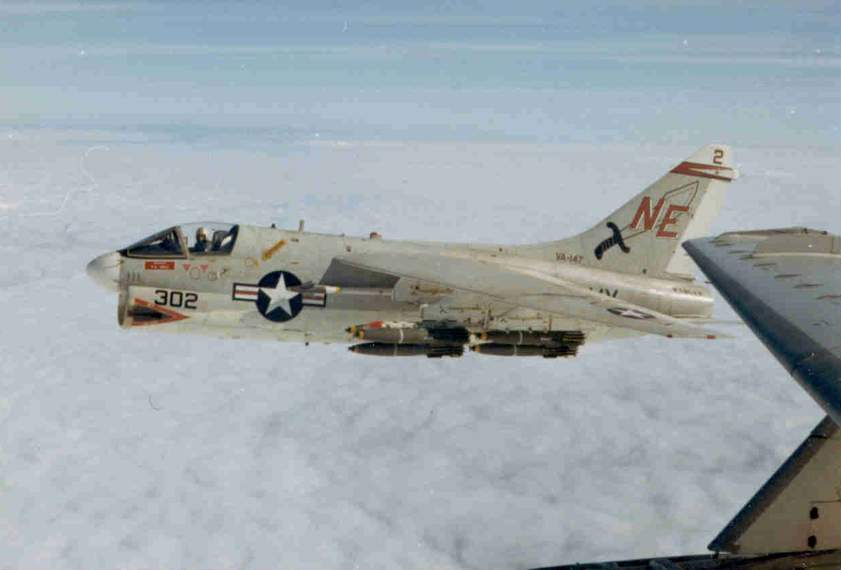
VA-147 A-7A over Vietnam in 1968–69.

=== 1960s ===
Attack Squadron 147 was commissioned as the U.S. Navy's first A-7 Corsair II Squadron on 1 February 1967 at NAS Lemoore. The Squadron received its first A-7A on 28 June 1967. It was assigned to CVW-2, and in December 1967, the Squadron flew its first combat missions (and the first for the A-7), striking targets in North Vietnam from USS Ranger. The Squadron would deploy a total of five times in support of the Vietnam War.

In January 1968 while embarked on Ranger, the Squadron flew support missions during the siege at Khe Sanh before the carrier was ordered from Yankee Station to the Sea of Japan following the capture of USS Pueblo by North Korea on 23 January 1968. In April 1969, following the shoot down of a Navy EC-121 aircraft by the North Koreans on 15 April, Ranger, with VA-147 embarked, again left Yankee Station and proceeded to the Sea of Japan for operations off the coast of Korea. After deployment, the Squadron converted to the A-7E in September 1969.

=== 1970s ===
VA-147 deployed to WestPac/Vietnam aboard USS America in 1970, and USS Constellation in 1971–72. From April 1972 in response to the Easter Offensive, the Squadron participated in Operation Freedom Train, tactical air sorties against military and logistic targets in South Vietnam and the Southern part of North Vietnam. In March–June 1973 embarked on Constellation, VA-147 provided aerial support during Operation End Sweep, the removal of mines from North Vietnamese waters.

In November 1974, VA-147 embarked on USS Constellation, operated in the Persian Gulf. This was the first time in 26 years that an American carrier had entered and operated in the Persian Gulf. The Squadron won the Battle "E" Award in 1977 as the top Corsair Squadron in the Pacific Fleet.

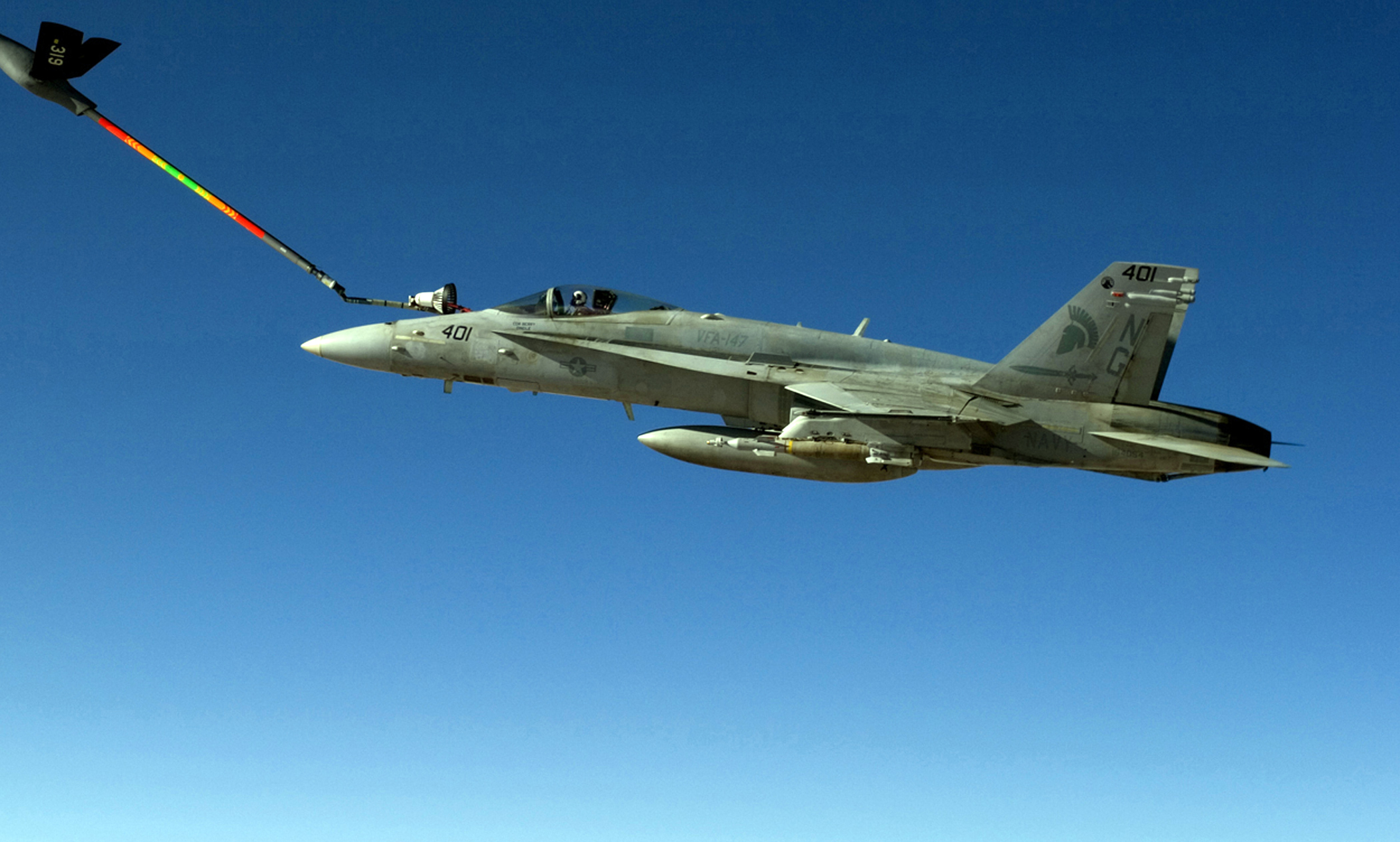
VFA-147 F/A-18C refuels in 2005.

=== 1980s ===
VA-147 deployed aboard USS Constellation in 1980 and 1981–82. During these deployments, the Squadron remained ashore at NAS Cubi Point as CVW-9’s Beach Detachment as part of the "Swing Wing Concept" during most of Constellation's deployment.

Between January 1984 and June 1987, the Squadron deployed three times aboard USS Kitty Hawk, including an around-the-world cruise.

In September 1988 while embarked on the first of two USS Nimitz deployments, VA-147 operated in the Sea of Japan in support of the 1988 Summer Olympic Games in Seoul, South Korea. The next month, Nimitz, with VA-147 embarked, participated in Operation Earnest Will, the escorting of reflagged Kuwaiti tankers through the Persian Gulf.

The Squadron was redesignated Strike Fighter Squadron 147 (VFA-147) on 20 July 1989, and transitioned to the F/A-18C Hornet under the instruction of VFA-125. The Squadron received its first LOT XII "Night Attack" Hornet in December 1989.

=== 1990s ===
The Squadron deployed to the Persian Gulf in March 1991 in support of Operation Desert Storm during troop withdrawal operations. They became the Navy's first operational F/A-18 Squadron to employ the Navigational Forward Looking Infra-Red pods (NAV FLIR) and night vision goggles.

In June 1995 they completed the transition to new LOT XVI/XVII F/A-18C aircraft with the APG-73 radar and Enhanced Performance Engines. They made deployments to the Gulf three more times in support of Operation Southern Watch aboard USS Nimitz.

In May 1998 the Squadron conducted a wholesale swap of their Lot XVI Hornets for Lot XI Hornets from VFA-195.

=== 2000s ===
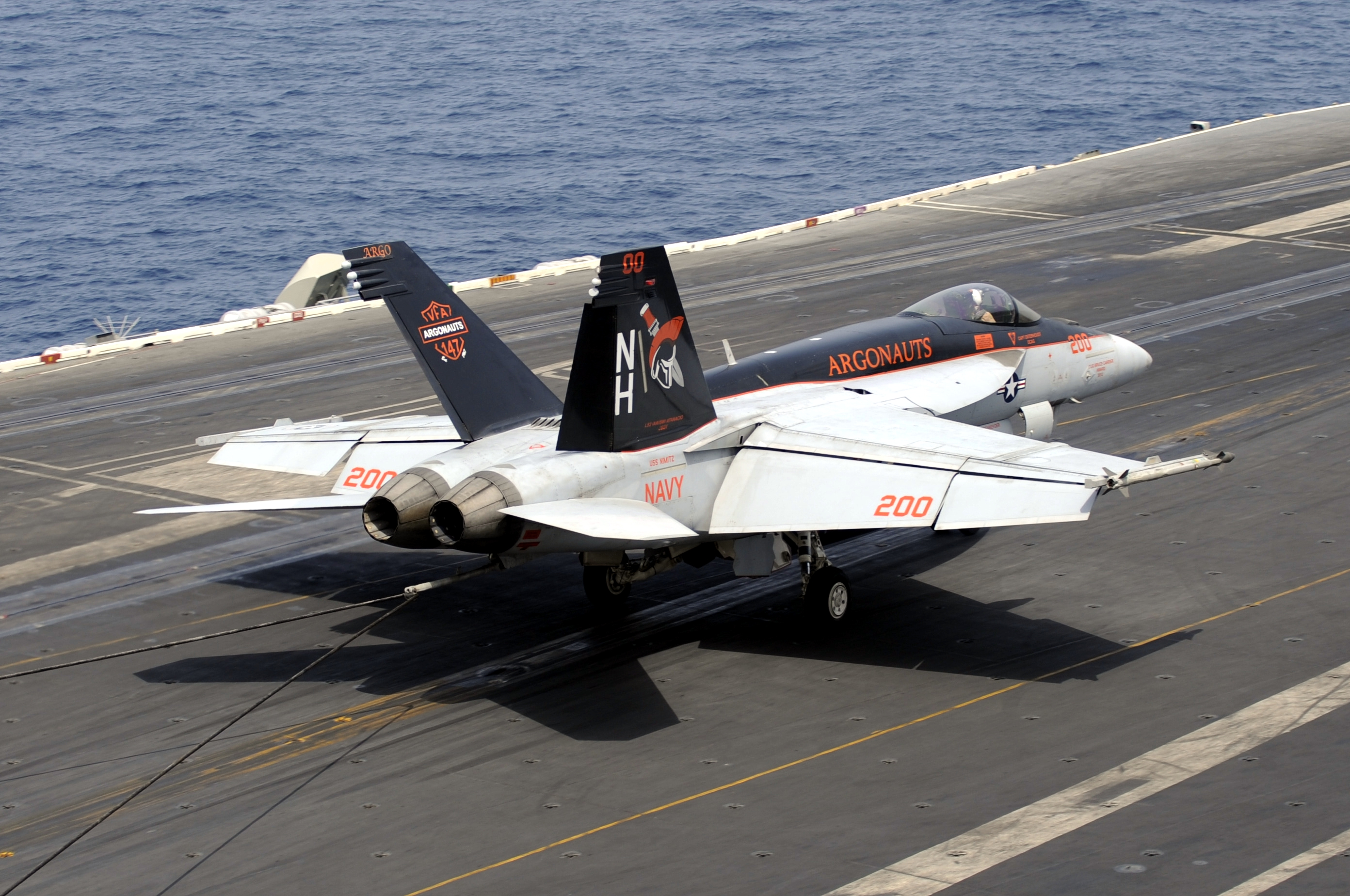
VFA-147 F/A-18E lands on USS Nimitz in the Gulf of Oman, 2013.

After the September 11 attacks, the Squadron participated in Operation Noble Eagle, flying combat patrols over Los Angeles from USS John C. Stennis. The Squadron deployed aboard USS John C. Stennis in support of Operation Enduring Freedom, conducting numerous strikes into Afghanistan against Taliban and Al-Qaeda forces. During these missions, VFA-147 also helped refine the employment of the Joint Direct Attack Munition.

VFA-147 received the 2002 Battle E Award, recognizing them as the top Squadron in the Pacific Strike Fighter Wing. VFA-147 deployed aboard USS Carl Vinson on 17 January 2003 to the Western Pacific for an 8-month deployment in the South China Sea and the Western Pacific.

The Squadron next deployed on USS Carl Vinson with CVW-9 in support of Operation Iraqi Freedom in January 2005. CVW-9 was reassigned to USS John C. Stennis in 2007. VFA-147 was awarded the 2007 Battle "E", and was named the U.S. Navy’s top F/A-18C Hornet Squadron for 2007 earning the Capt. Michael J. Estocin Award.

The Squadron began transitioning to the F/A-18E Super Hornets in October 2007, and completed transition in February 2008. VFA-147 and CVW-9 deployed with John C. Stennis on a scheduled Western Pacific deployment on 13 January 2009.

After 40 years of having been assigned to CVW-9, VFA-147 was reassigned to CVW-14 aboard the USS Ronald Reagan for two deployments in 2010 and 2011. The following year, the Squadron was deployed to CVW-11 aboard USS Nimitz. VFA-147 participated in exercise RIMPAC 2012 and began a scheduled deployment to the Western Pacific and the Indian Ocean on 30 March 2013. After 2 extensions and after supporting Operation Enduring Freedom, VFA-147 returned home on 12 December 2013.

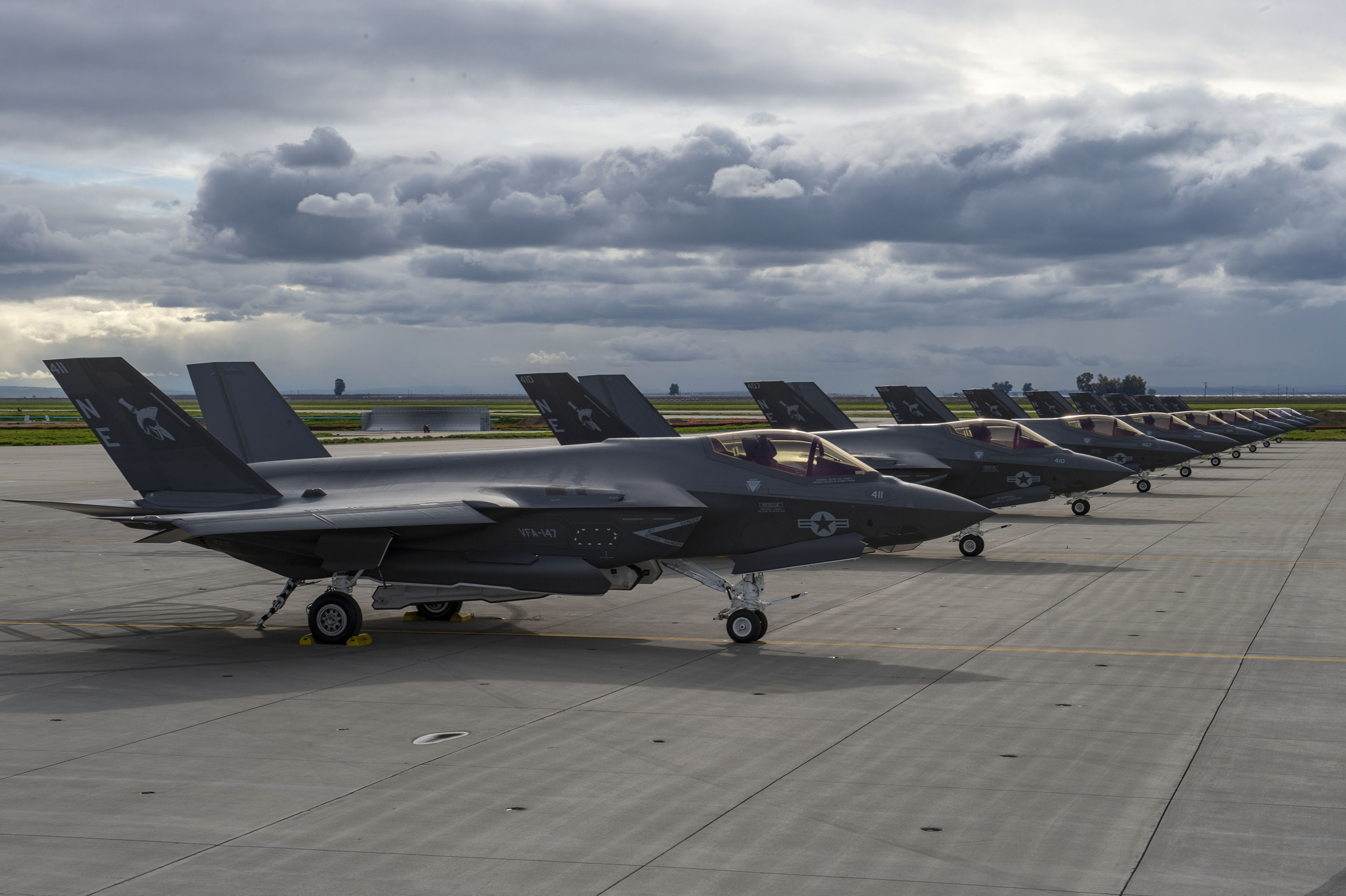
VFA-147 F-35Cs at NAS Lemoore, in February 2019.

VFA-147 was selected to be the first operational Squadron to transition to the F-35C in January 2018. On 1 March 2019, it was announced that VFA-147 was to transfer from Carrier Air Wing 11 to Carrier Air Wing 2 for USS Carl Vinson's next deployment. Carl Vinson left San Diego for her deployment on 3 August 2021 returning on 14 February 2022. During the deployment, an F-35C, BuNo169304, crashed into the flight deck of the Vinson and slid off the carrier into the South China Sea. This marked the first loss of a carrier-variant F-35 fighter.

In April of 2024, VFA-147 deployed with USS George Washington and Carrier Air Wing Seven for Southern Seas 2024. In August of 2024 the Squadron joined Carrier Air Wing Five and established operations at MCAS Iwakuni, Japan in November of 2024. The Squadron is the first forward deployed F-35C squadron in the US Navy.

In August 2026, VFA-147 as part of CVW-5 onboard the USS George Washington arrived in the CENTCOM AOR. VFA-147 and their F-35Cs then began undertaking combat missions against Iran within Operation Epic Fury.

== See also ==
- List of United States Navy aircraft squadrons
- Naval Aviation
