= VF-21 =

Fighter Squadron 21 (VF-21)
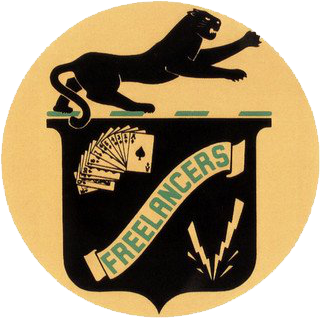
- VF-21 squadron patch
- Active: 2 March 1944 – 31 January 1996
- Country: United States
- Branch: Navy
- Nickname: Freelancers
- Aircraft: F6F Hellcat; F8F Bearcat; F9F Panther; F3H Demon; F-4 Phantom II; F-14 Tomcat
- Engagements: World War II; Korean War; Vietnam War; Operation Earnest Will; Operation Desert Shield; Operation Southern Watch; 1994 North Korean nuclear crisis

Fighter Squadron 21 (VF-21) Freelancers was an aviation unit of the United States Navy. Originally established in 1944 as VF-81 it was redesignated VF-13A in 1946, redesignated VF-131 in 1948, redesignated VF-64 in 1950 and redesignated VF-21 on 1 July 1959, it was disestablished on 31 January 1996. It was the third US Navy squadron to have the VF-21 designation.

The VF-21 was part of the first group to strike Tokyo Bay during World War II.

== History ==
=== Korean War and 1950s ===
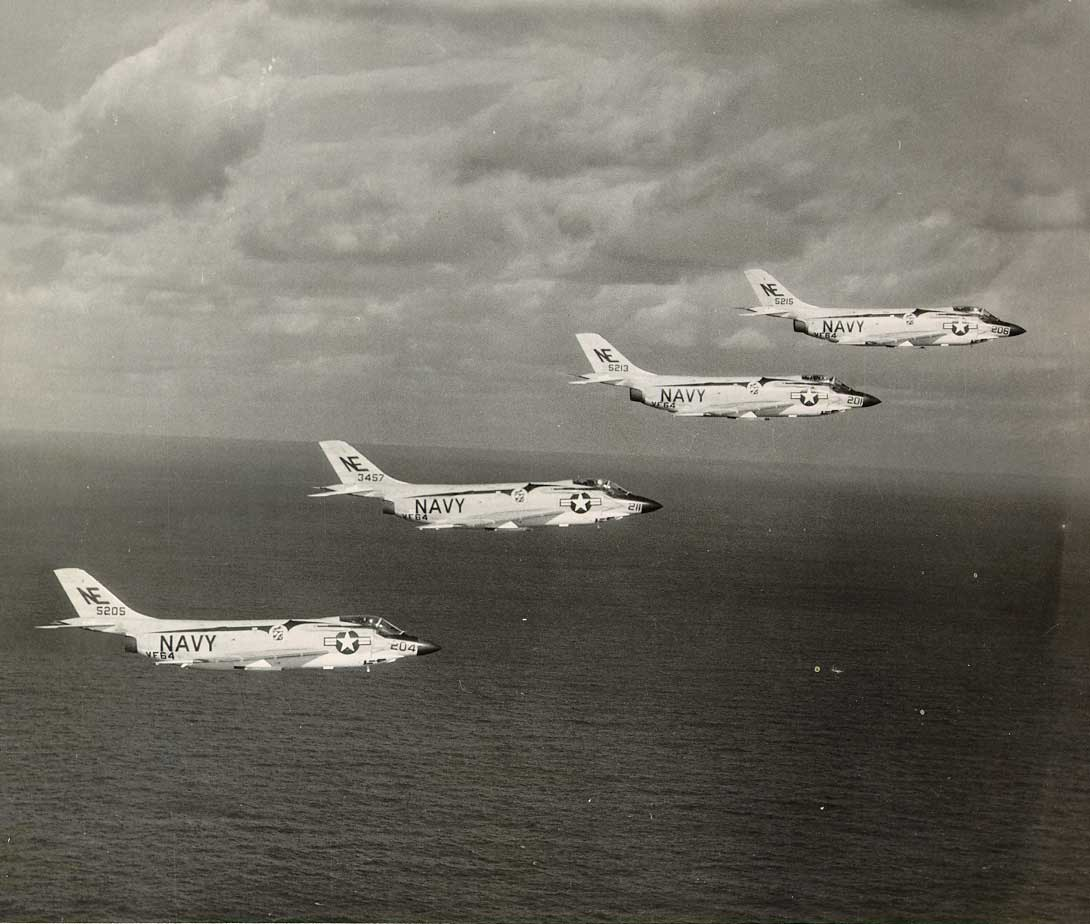
VF-64 F3H-2s in 1958.

VF-64 operating F4U-4s was assigned to Carrier Air Group 2 (CVG-2) aboard USS Philippine Sea, off the Korean coast from 28 March to 9 June 1951.

VF-21 embarked on its major deployment with the F3H-2 Demon on USS Midway in mid-1958. In June 1961 VF-21 was reassigned to Miramar. It was here VF-21 transitioned to the F-4B Phantom in 1963 and between November of that year to March 1964 it would be the last peace-time cruise for the next 10 years.

=== Vietnam War and 1970s ===
VF-21 returned to sea in March 1965 and were bound for the Vietnam War and VF-21's first aerial victories would be the first confirmed kills achieved by a U.S. Navy fighter squadron during that conflict. On 17 June 1965 Commander Louis Page and Lieutenant John Smith destroyed a MiG-17 with an AIM-7 Sparrow and moments later Lieutenant Jack Batson, jr and Lieutenant Commander Robert Doremus destroyed another MiG-17 with an AIM-7.

VF-21 made six further deployments to the war zone aboard USS Coral Sea and USS Ranger between 1966 and 1973. In 1968 VF-21 upgraded to the F-4J and continued to operate this model until 1979. In December 1979 VF-21 was re-equipped with the F-4S, but it was decided that the F-4S was not ideally suited to be used from USS Coral Sea which VF-21 would deploy on for its next cruise, and instead VF-21 deployed with the less effective F-4N.

=== 1980s ===
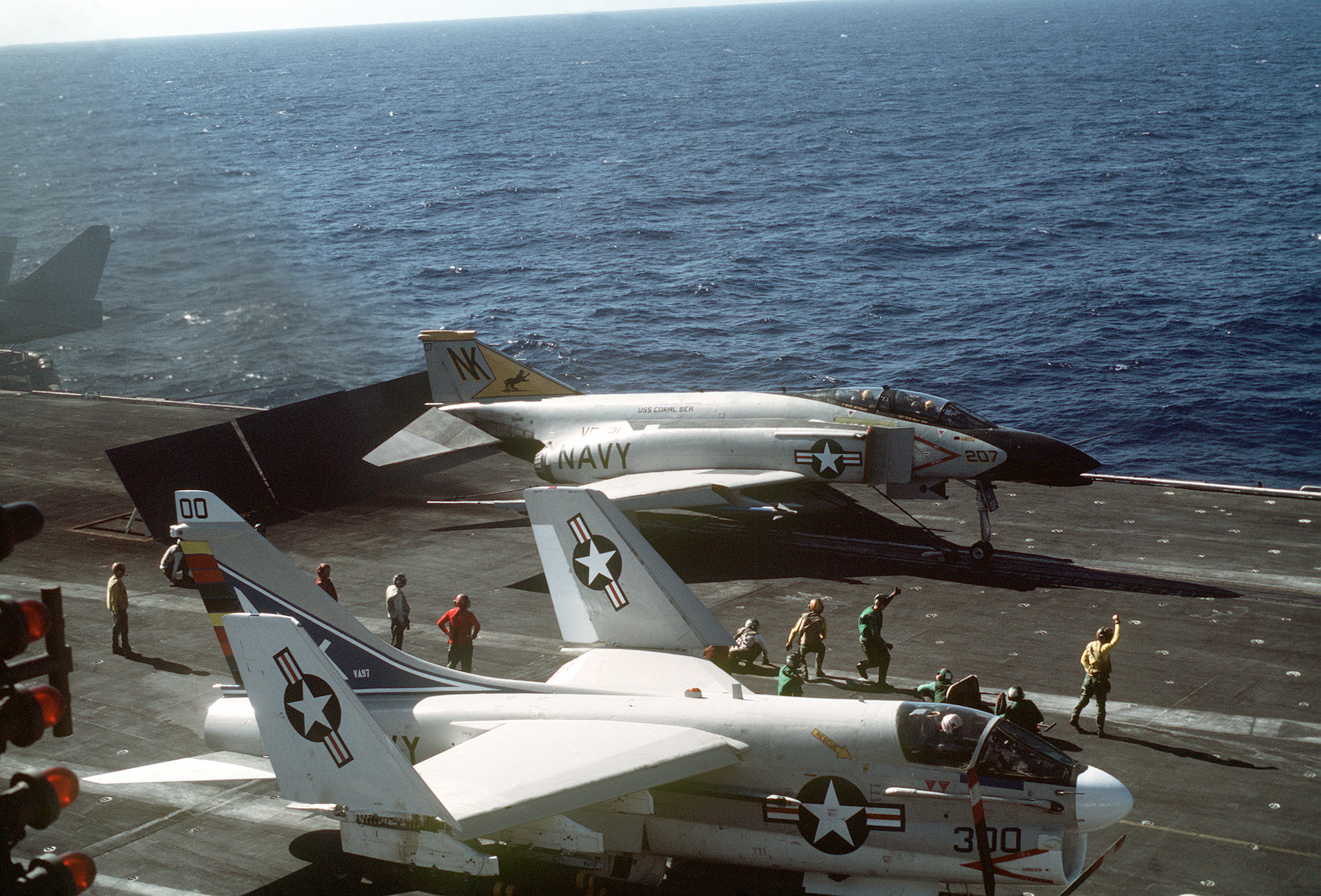
An F-4N from VF-21 awaiting launch from USS Coral Sea.

CVW-14 assigned control over VF-21 and the squadron returned to sea in 1981, spending seven months in the Pacific and the Indian Ocean. A new deployment followed in 1983, where VF-21 was one of several squadrons that took part in Coral Sea's world cruise of that year which culminated in a change of fleet assignment to conduct operations in the Atlantic Ocean and the Mediterranean Sea. The 1983 tour was also noteworthy in that it marked the last occasion on which US Navy Phantoms were to deploy from a US base, VF-21 joining with sister squadron VF-154 in a final "fly-in" to Miramar in mid-September. Although this was not the end of the F-4, some aircraft lingered on until 4 November, VF-21 hosted a ceremony which honored "the end of an era" for the F-4 in fleet operations, VF-21 and VF-154 were the last US-based squadrons to fly F-4s (although there were two forward deployed squadrons continued to operate the F-4). VF-21 now transitioned to the F-14A Tomcat, the process was managed by VF-124 and it was not until later half of 1984 that VF-21 was declared fully operational, the first cruise was with CVW-14 aboard USS Constellation in early 1985.

In 1987, VF-21 launched AIM-7 Sparrow missiles against an Iranian F-4 that had engaged a P-3 Orion in the Persian Gulf.

=== 1990s ===
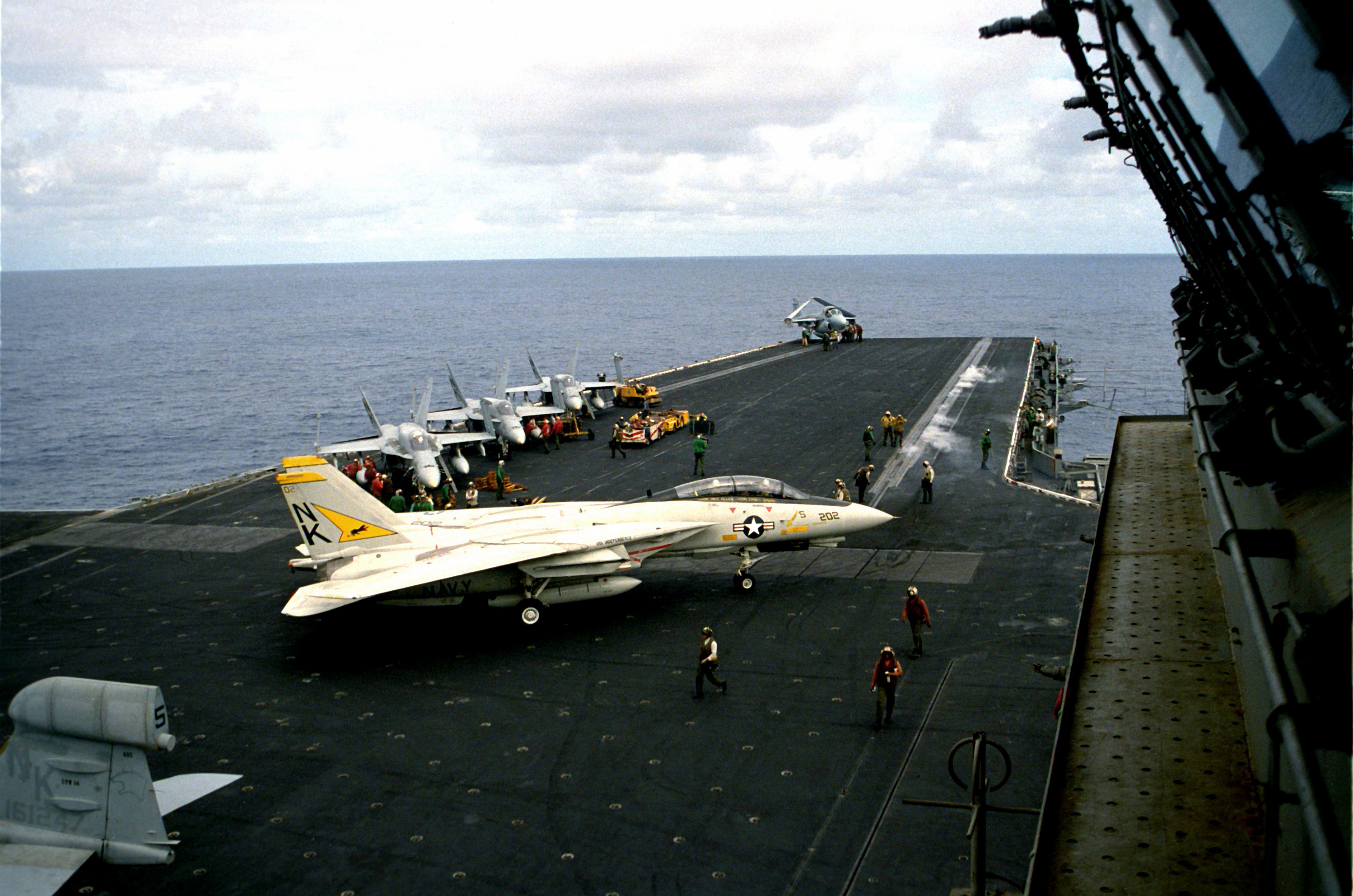
An F-14A from VF-21 aboard USS Independence in 1990.

In 1990 the squadron, with the rest of its air wing, moved to USS Independence. VF-21 arrived on station in the Persian Gulf on 5 August 1990 and was part of the Carrier Group that was America's first response to Iraq's 2 August 1990 Invasion of Kuwait. VF-21 maintained Combat Air Patrol "CAP" missions during Operation Desert Shield, the buildup of coalition forces to liberate Kuwait. However, the USS Independence battle group) was relieved on station by the Ranger and Midway Carrier battle groups at the onset of Operation Desert Storm. General Norman Schwarzkopf flew aboard the USS Independence to command the battle group; CBS Anchor Dan Rather reported from the USS Independence flight deck. VF-21 returned aboard the USS Independence to establish Operation Southern Watch immediately after Desert Storm.

In August 1991 USS Independence took over the role of USS Midway as the only carrier home ported outside the USA, at Yokosuka, Japan. During this change the squadron stayed with the same carrier but moved air wings, from CVW-14 to CVW-5 as well as being repositioned to NAF Atsugi. This was, because the Midway air wing had been without F-14s, as the older ship could not accommodate the F-14's size and weight.

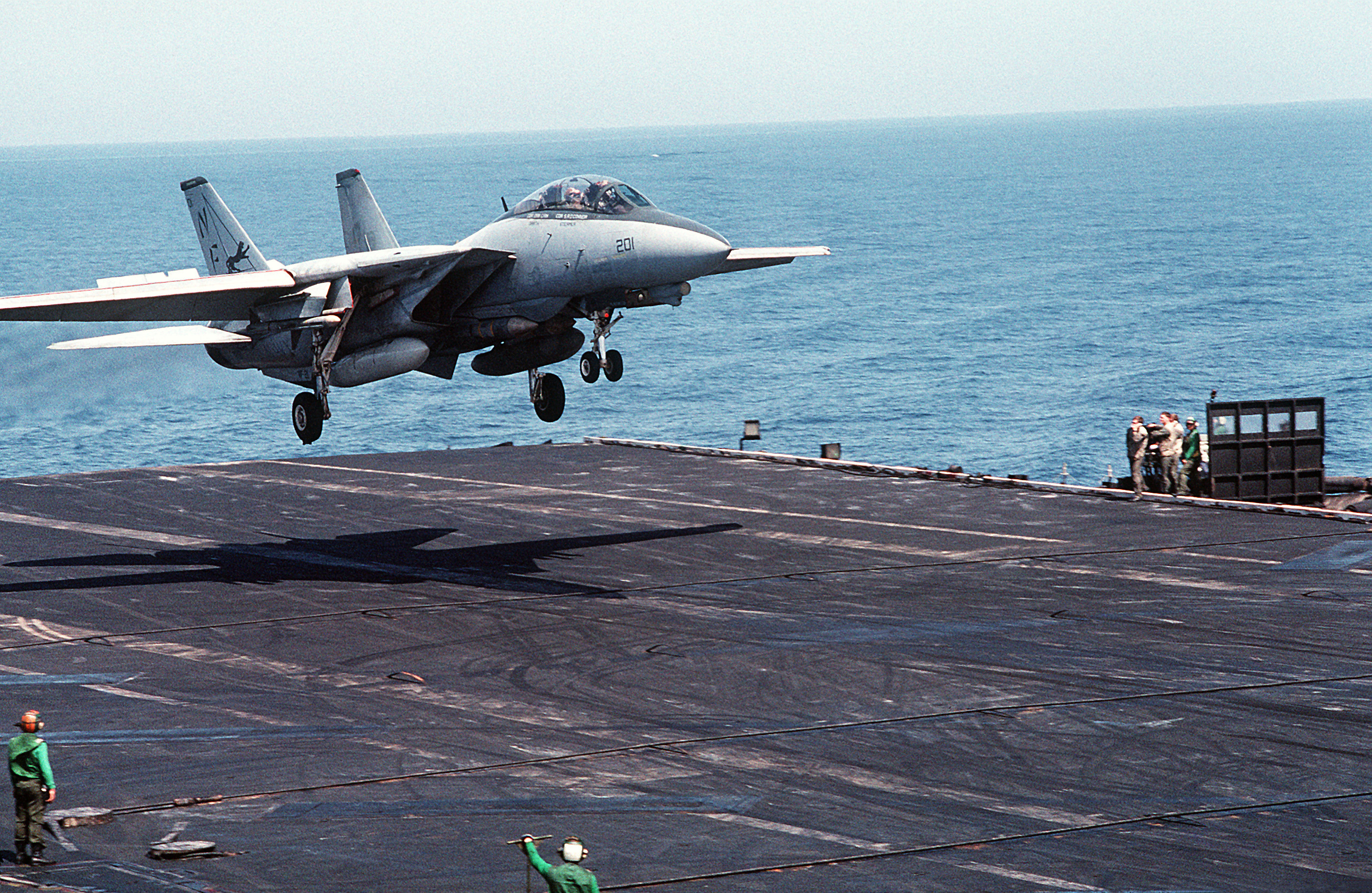
An F-14A from VF-21 landing aboard the USS Independence in 1992.

After a deployment in the West Pacific and the Sea of Japan between 15 October, and 24 November 1991 and the last Carrier visit to Subic Bay in March 1992, Independence and VF-21 deployed to the Persian Gulf on 15 April 1992. In May, they visited Sydney, Australia to commemorate the 50th Anniversary of the Battle of the Coral Sea in 1942. In June, a one plane detachment visited Doha Air Base which included training in DACT with the Qatar Air Force. On 23 August, the Independence CVBG entered the Persian Gulf, beginning what would become Operation Southern Watch. After 18 days, the Carrier left the Persian Gulf, relieved by the USS Ranger. They VF-21 returned to Atsugi on 11 October 1992, two days before the Independence pulled into Yokosuka.

In February 1993, VF-21 took part in Exercise Team Spirit '93 with South Korea. BuNo 161606 as NF-201, an F-14A assigned to VF-21, crashed during ACM training on 29 April 1993 off Oshima, 174 km SE of Atusgi, the crew being rescued by an SH-60B from HSL-51 and an SH-3H Sea King from HS-12 aboard the Independence. On 11 May, VF-21 departed with CVW-5 and the Independence, taking part in Spring Training '93 with the Royal Australian Navy from 28 May – 2 June 1993. In September, they took part in ANNUALEX '93 with the JMSDF in the Sea of Japan before returning to Yokosuka. On 17 November, they deployed on their second Southern Watch deployment as well as Somalia.

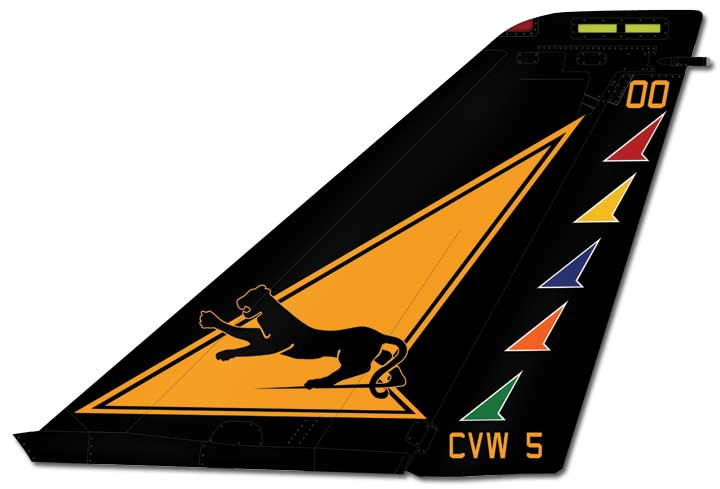
VF-21 CAG Bird tail markings (NF-200) when with CVW-5

After returning from this deployment on 17 March 1994, they took part in RIMPAC '94 against the USS Constellation near Hawaii, before taking part in contingency operations in response to the death of North Korea's first leader, Kim Il-Sung on 8 July and the Nuclear crisis on the Korean Peninsula. In December, news came that VF-21 would be retired after 1995, with VF-154 taking on the role as the sole Tomcats squadron of CVW-5.

On 19 August 1995, the squadron departed on its last ever deployment, this time to the Persian Gulf as part of Southern Watch. VF-21 returned from deployment on board the Independence to Atusgi on 6 November 1995, before the Independence arrived on the 8th at Yokosuka. Soon VF-21 was disestablished on 31 January 1996, the official ceremony being held on the 12 January. Four of VF-21's F-14As were given to VF-154 while remaining 5 rest were transferred back to United States on 12 December (two to NAS Miramar and three to NAS Oceana).

== See also ==
- History of the United States Navy
- List of inactive United States Navy aircraft squadrons
- List of United States Navy aircraft squadrons
