= HSC-14 =

Helicopter Sea Combat Squadron 14
- HSC-14 insignia
- Active: 10 July 1984 – present
- Country: United States of America
- Branch: United States Navy
- Type: Navy Helicopter Squadron
- Role: Anti-surface warfare (ASUW); Combat search & rescue (CSAR); Search & rescue (SAR); Special operations (SpecOps); Vertical replenishment (VERTREP)
- Size: 250 Personnel
- Part of: CVW-9
- Garrison/HQ: Naval Air Station North Island
- Nickname: "Chargers"
- Mottos: "Day and Night, Lightning Strikes!"
- Colors: Blue / Gold
- Engagements: Operation Prosperity Guardian; Operation Poseidon Archer; Operation Epic Fury

Commanders
- Current commander: Commander A. Robin "Wednesday" Dirckerson

Helicopter Sea Combat Squadron 14 (HSC-14) "Chargers" is an aviation unit of the United States Navy based at Naval Air Station North Island, California. HSC-14 was established as Helicopter Anti-Submarine Squadron 14 (HS-14) in 1984 and was redesignated HSC-14 in 2013. The squadron is equipped with the Sikorsky MH-60S Seahawk.

== Mission ==
HSC-14 flies the MH-60S Seahawk helicopter, an all-weather, day and night multi-mission helicopter. The primary mission of the squadron is Anti-Surface Warfare (ASUW). Additionally, the squadron is trained and equipped to conduct search and rescue (SAR), medevac, combat search and rescue (CSAR), naval special warfare operations (NSW), anti-ship missile defense (ASMD) and fleet logistics support, including VERTREP.

== Command history ==
HS-14 was established on 10 July 1984 at Naval Air Station North Island in San Diego, California, and originally flew the Sikorsky SH-3H "Sea King" helicopter. Assigned to Carrier Air Wing TWO from 1984 to 1993, the Chargers deployed aboard the aircraft carrier USS Ranger. In 1989, while deployed off the coast of Vietnam in the South China Sea, HS-14 participated in one of the largest rescue operations ever by a deployed helicopter squadron when they rescued 37 Vietnamese refugees who were trapped aboard a foundering boat.

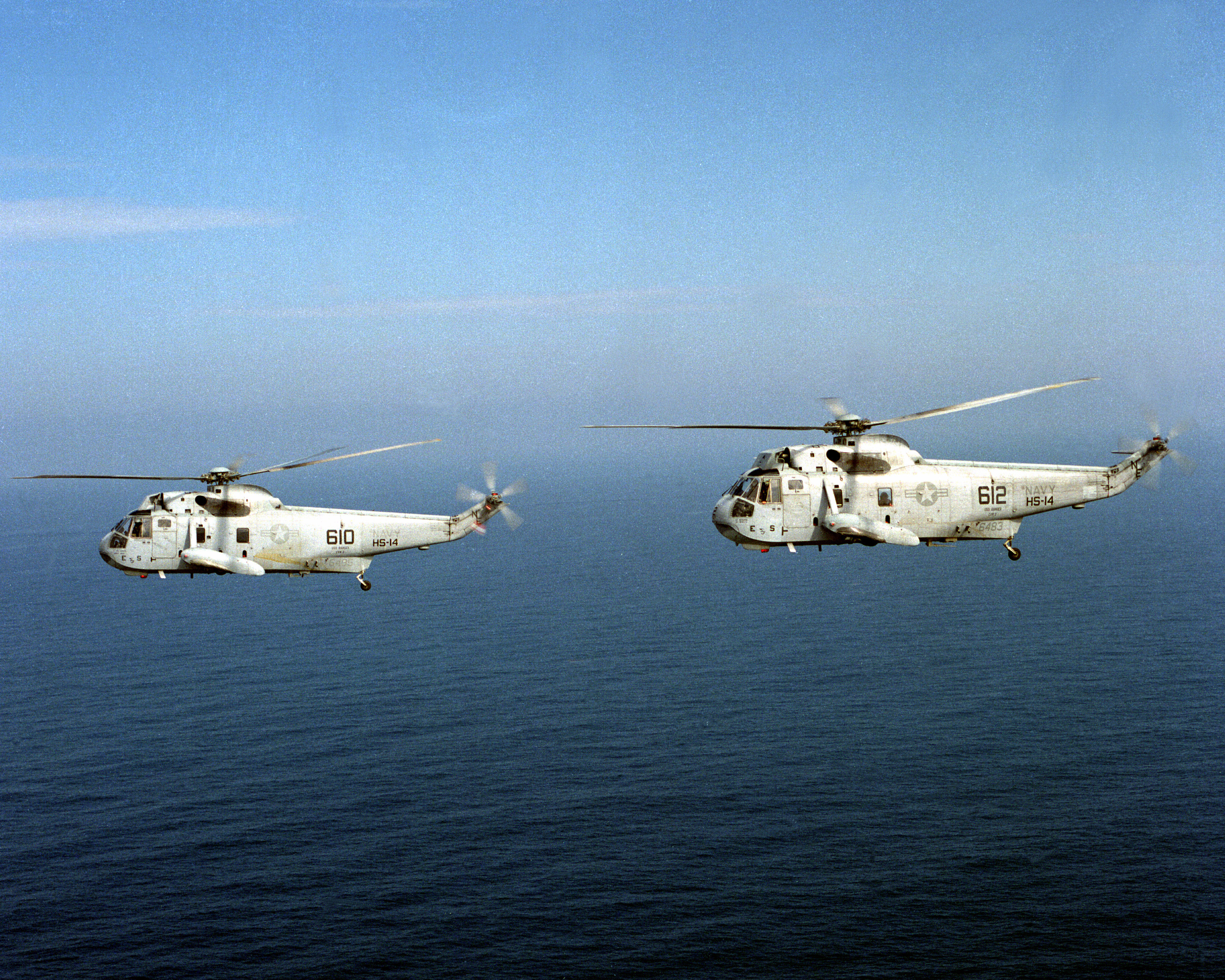
SH-3H Sea Kings of HS-14 in 1990

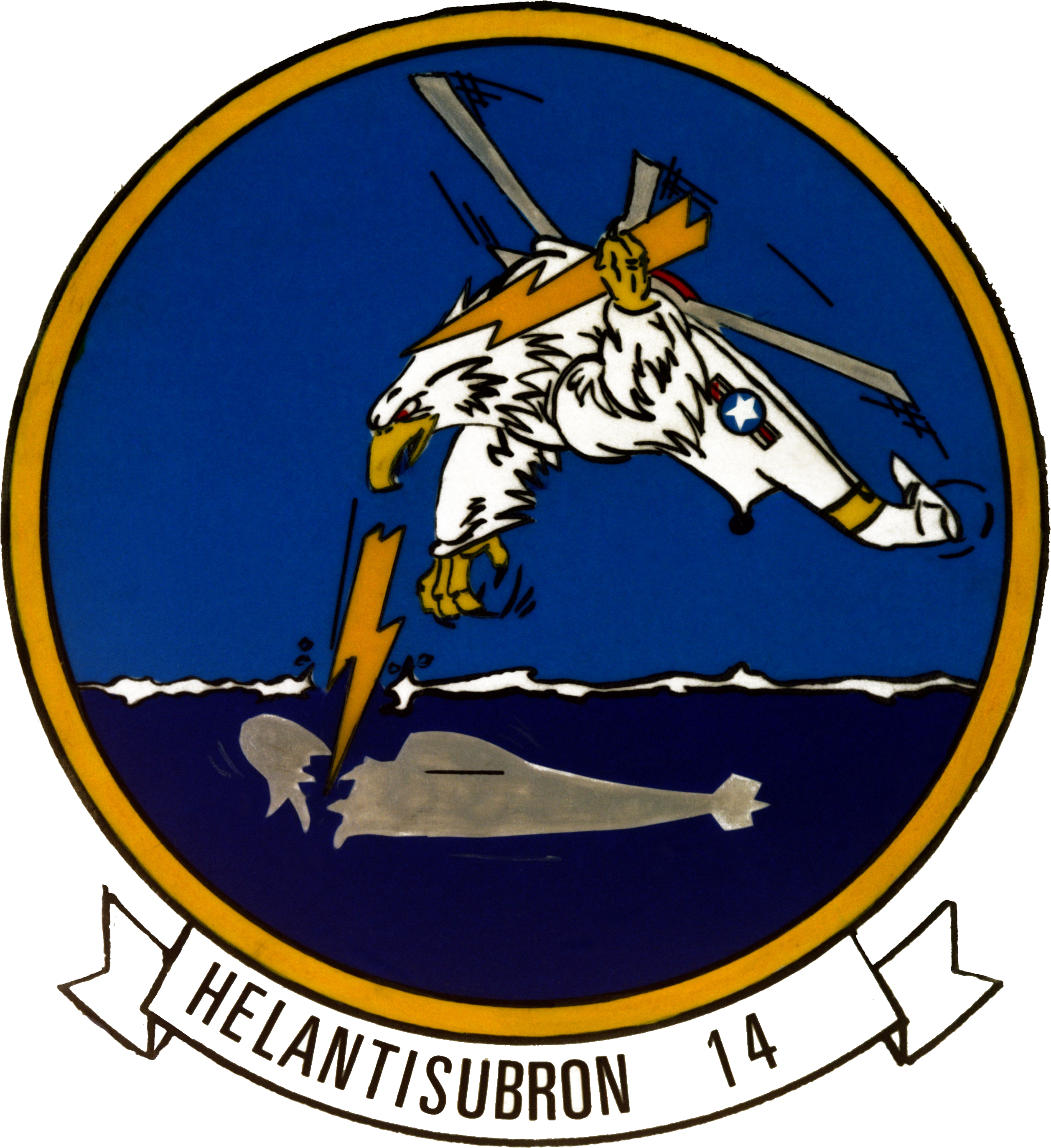
Squadron insignia, 1984–1994

In 1991, HS-14 participated in Operation Desert Shield and Desert Storm. During Desert Storm, the Chargers participated in an operation that resulted in the capture of four Iraqi commandos on a small island off the coast of Kuwait. Additionally, HS-14 played an important role in the destruction of one Iraqi gunboat and two anti-shipping mines. In 1992, the squadron deployed in support of Operation Southern Watch to the Northern Persian Gulf and to the coast of Somalia in support of Operation Restore Hope. In December 1992, the squadron surged to support the first eleven days of Operation Restore Hope with such determination and efficiency that the operational commander wrote, "without HS-14, the first ten days of RESTORE HOPE simply could not have happened."

In May 1993, the squadron moved 175 men and women, seven aircraft, and all their support equipment from San Diego to Mayport, Florida, in four days. The cross-country move was executed to embark on board USS Constellation for her transit around South America to San Diego. During this transit, the squadron participated in coordinated anti-submarine warfare (ASW) with several South American navies.

In October 1993, the Chargers began the transition from the Sea King to the SH-60F Seahawk helicopter. Soon afterward, military downsizing dictated the decommissioning of HS-12, a sister squadron in Japan. For HS-14, this meant an accelerated transition schedule and training program to complete a homeport change to Atsugi, Japan by October 1994. The squadron's progress in this endeavor was rewarded with a personal visit from then Chief of Naval Operations, Admiral Frank B. Kelso.

HS-14 executed back-to-back deployments to the Persian Gulf in 1998 and 1999, participating in Operation Southern Watch. Additionally, the squadron began its annual participation in the bilateral exercises Foal Eagle and ANNUALEX. In 1998, the Chargers made USS Kitty Hawk their permanent sea-based home, traveling to Hawaii aboard USS Independence in July for the complicated cross-deck move.

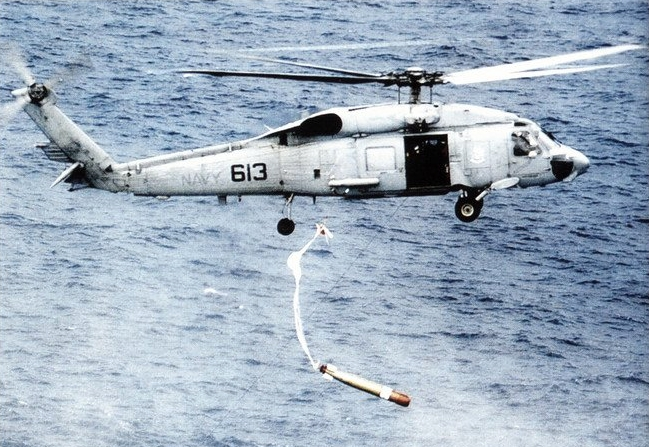
A HS-14 SH-60F Seahawk drops a torpedo in 1996

In early 2002, the HS-14 supported Operation Enduring Freedom in Afghanistan by deploying a detachment on board USS Kitty Hawk. During this deployment, Kitty Hawk served as a mobile staging base for elite United States Army special operations units. In March 2003, as the situation in Iraq escalated, HS-14 and Kitty Hawk received orders to participate in Operation Iraqi Freedom. The Chargers were assigned to provide a naval special warfare (NSW) capability to forward operating bases in support of SEAL operations. The squadron also affected the recovery of a CVW-5 strike fighter pilot who was downed in hostile territory.

After returning from the Persian Gulf, HS-14 participated in several training and operational deployments, including the historic PULSE EX 2004. This exercise represented a shift in naval policy from set "work-up" periods and deployment schedules to a rapid-responding, surge capable force. During PULSE EX the Navy deployed six carriers simultaneously around the world to demonstrate the projection of power available under the new doctrine. It was during this deployment that an S-3B Viking from CVW-14 crashed on the remote and rugged island of Kita Iwo Jima. HS-14 deployed two Seahawks within three hours to Iwo Jima to conduct search and recovery operations. Working closely with United States Air Force Pararescuemen from 33rd Rescue Squadron, the cruiser USS Lake Champlain and the frigate USS Gary, HS-14 was able to locate the wreckage, salvage parts of the aircraft and return the remains of the Viking crew. This accomplishment was noted in a personal letter from President George W. Bush to the wife of one of the fallen aviators.

In the fall of 2004, an HS-14 detachment deployed two HH-60H helicopters on board USNS GySgt. Fred W. Stockham in support of Operation Enduring Freedom Philippines. The overall effort proved to be a success and established the HS community as a leading participant in the global war on terrorism. In the first week of December 2004, typhoons Imbudo and Namando struck the Philippines, causing extensive damage. Helicopters of HS-14 provided humanitarian assistance. The squadron was able to provide immediate relief to the most stricken victims of the typhoons and rescue over 100 refugees. At the same time, another HS-14 detachment was deployed on board the guided-missile cruiser USS Vincennes to support several 7th Fleet ASW exercises, operating in conjunction with the Japan Maritime Self-Defense Force (JMSDF). Additionally, the squadron operated a third detachment out of Atsugi, Japan.

After being deployed or detached eleven out of twelve months in 2004, the HS-14 operated from Kitty Hawk in January 2005, operating off the southeast coast of Japan. In February 2005, the squadron deployed for routine training operations in the Okinawa Fleet Operations Areas. Simultaneously, HS-14 deployed a one-plane detachment and 18 personnel to the destroyer USS Cushing to operate with Destroyer Squadron 15 in bilateral ASW operations with the South Korean Navy.

After some rest and relaxation in Hong Kong, Kitty Hawk headed north toward Korea for Operation Foal Eagle. HS-14 spent most of the year deployed and participating in exercises such as Talisman Saber, Orange Crush, JASEX, SHAREM, MULTI-SAIL, and ANNUALEX.

== 2006 ==
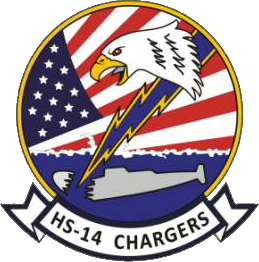
Squadron insignia, 1994–2013

June 2006 marked the start of another eventful summer deployment aboard Kitty Hawk for HS-14. Before deploying, HS-14 earned the "Golden Wrench Award" for having the most outstanding maintenance department in the airwing. This marked the third time the Chargers had taken home the award, more than any other squadron in CVW-5. With maintenance operating at full potential and the flight crews ready to fight, the Chargers were ready to start the cruise.

The deployment began with a short port call to Otaru, Japan, a suburb of Sapporo on the Japanese island of Hokkaido. After Otaru, Kitty Hawk's Carrier Strike Group Five joined up with Carrier Strike Group Nine, led by USS Abraham Lincoln, and the USS Ronald Reagan Carrier Strike Group, along with Marine Corps, Air Force, and various foreign militaries for the largest operation in over a decade, Valiant Shield. This exercise involved more than 30 ships, 280 aircraft, and 22,000 sailors, marines, and airmen, and focused on the strike groups' ability to maintain a very robust air strike schedule while being attacked by multiple submarine and surface threats. HS-14 performed incredibly, scoring many simulated torpedo attacks on the American, Australian, and Singaporean attacking subs, while allowing almost no attacks against the carrier Kitty Hawk.

While defending the carrier from simulated submarine attacks, HS-14 also had a dedicated Combat Search and Rescue detachment working out of Guam. This detachment focused on joint operations with HS-2 while conducting NSW insertions and extractions. The detachment also gave the crews a chance to learn different techniques when operating in low light, tactical environments. HS-14 worked with several other units from different services and countries during the remainder of the year. Further exercises included "Allies in the Outback", ANNUALEX, and an Atsugi CSAR Detachment.

== 2007 ==
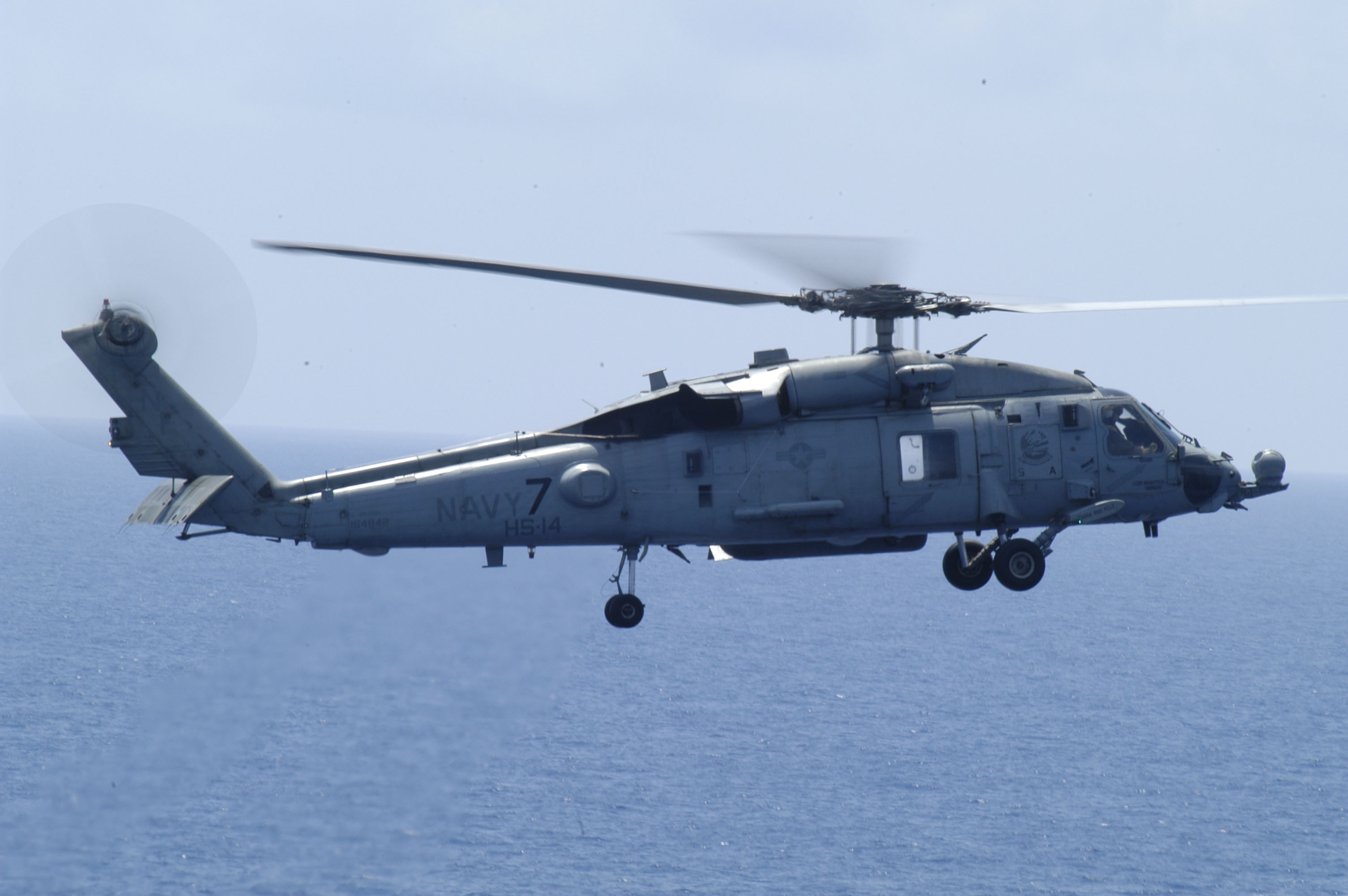
A HS-14 HH-60H in 2005

In 2007, HS-14 sent a four helicopter detachment to Kadena Air Base on the island of Okinawa, Japan to practice weapons employment and terrain flying. The crews were able to take advantage of the area's weapons ranges and fired two AGM-114 Hellfire missiles and three Mk 46 practice torpedoes. Additionally, HS-14 practiced joint operations with multiple commands and services. HS-14 practiced anti-submarine warfare tracking and attacking techniques with the P-3C Orion aircraft from Patrol Squadron 4. HS-14 was also able to practice fast roping, rappelling, and High Altitude Low Opening and static-line paradrops with the 1st of the 1st Airborne Rangers, U.S. Army. The 320th Tactics Squadron also worked with HS-14 practicing similar techniques.

Kitty Hawk, began another deployment in May, making stops in Guam, Sydney, Brisbane, Guam again, and Kuala Lumpur. HS-14 participated in multiple exercises during the deployment, including Talisman Saber, Valiant Shield, and Malabar 2007. During a port call in Muroran, Northern Japan, in October, HS-14 detached two HH-60Hs and four aircrews to Misawa Air Base for FLIR/Hellfire training. The detachment rejoined Kitty Hawk prior to ANNUALEX 19G, the naval portion of a larger U.S./Japanese exercise. Following the exercise, Carrier Strike Group Five made international headlines when it was denied entrance to the port of Hong Kong for the Thanksgiving holiday. HS-14 returned to Atsugi in early December.

== 2008 ==
HS-14 began 2008 with another weapons detachment to Kadena Air Base in Okinawa, beginning in early February. The detachment used four helicopters to fire Hellfire missiles, drop torpedoes, and conduct ASW, CSAR, NSW, and close air support (CAS) training with Marines, Air Force, and Army personnel.

Detachment "B" joined the guided missile destroyer USS Lassen in January 2008 and conducted independent operations until March. HS-14's main body embarked aboard Kitty Hawk for sea trials in March, followed by workups in April, including a port call at Hong Kong. Detachment A embarked aboard the guided missile cruisers USS Shiloh and USS Cowpens from February through May. Carrier Strike Group Five left Yokosuka in May, marking Kitty Hawk's final departure from Japan. Detachment A rejoined the main squadron aboard Kitty Hawk for this cruise, while Detachment B returned to NAF Atsugi. The strike group visited Guam in June, then proceeded to Pearl Harbor, Hawaii.

At the end of the port call, HS-14 Detachment A "Misfits" debarked Kitty Hawk and embarked aboard the guided missile frigate USS Rodney M. Davis as its air department for exercise RIMPAC 2008. HS-14 Det. A conducted intensive ASW operations in a separate surface action group, providing support as a "pouncing" aircraft, as well multiple logistics flights in support of the ship. HS-14's main body aboard Kitty Hawk provided similar support to Carrier Strike Group Five.

Following RIMPAC, Kitty Hawk proceeded to San Diego as the carrier was replaced by USS George Washington. Before arriving in San Diego, HS-14 provided VERTREP for Kitty Hawk's ammunition offload. The squadron moved over 900 loads in two days.

CVW-5 flew off Kitty Hawk for the final time off the coast of California on 6 August. HS-14 provided photographic platforms for the flyoff, then flew off to Naval Air Station North Island on 7 August. When HS-14 landed at North Island that morning, it marked 14 years since the squadron was forward deployed to Japan. After Kitty Hawk tied up at NAS North Island, CVW-5 immediately began crossdeck operations required to establish itself aboard George Washington. For two weeks in August, HS-14 was divided between Kitty Hawk, George Washington, and HS-4's squadron spaces ashore.

George Washington pulled out of San Diego with CVW-5 embarked on 21 August. HS-14 flew aboard that afternoon, and following a Blue Water Certification and workups over the next couple weeks, the aircraft carrier began its trek west. The following month consisted of heavy flight operations for HS-14, to get CVW-5 and the George Washington Air Department working together as a cohesive team. George Washington arrived at Yokosuka on 25 September.

2008 Fall Cruise began on 30 September. HS-14 left a CSAR detachment back aboard NAF Atsugi for the month of October. Along with Detachment B, the composite detachment managed to qualify several pilots and aircrew in CSAR Syllabus. HS-14's main body continued to provide ASW and SAR service to George Washington as the Strike Group visited Pusan, South Korea, and Guam. Following the Guam port visit, Detachment A left the ship to embark the guided-missile cruiser USS Cowpens, while Detachment B departed Japan aboard USS Lassen. Both ships joined the George Washington Strike Group for ANNUALEX 20G, an exercise involving US and Japanese surface, subsurface, and air units. During the exercise, HS-14 provided round the clock ASW coverage, with George Washington-based helicopters covering days and detachment helicopters covering nights. The squadron scored numerous submarine kills, helping to validate the detachment concept. HS-14 and CVW-5 returned to Atsugi on 21 November, marking nearly nine months of underway time for the air wing in 2008.

== 2009 ==
During the 2009 Summer Deployment HS-14 participated in TALISMAN SABRE 2009. While the main body of HS-14 supported the air wing on the West coast of Australia, Detachment Bravo, on the destroyer USS Mustin conducted continuous ASW missions in support of multinational operations. In conjunction with two permanent Detachments, the Chargers sent a temporary detachment to Darwin, Australia to work with Australia Special Forces. As the Summer Deployment wound down, HS-14 celebrated both their 25th birthday on 10 July marking 25 years of service and 50,000 hours Class "A" mishap free.

During the Fall Deployment (October – November 2009), HS-14 flew over 500 additional Class "A" mishap free hours. While Chargers on board George Washington worked ASW for Talisman Sabre, Detachment Bravo conducted actual ASW operations tracking a Russian Oscar-class submarine. For the squadron's unequaled performance in its primary mission areas of Anti-Submarine Warfare (ASW) and Anti-Surface Warfare (ASU) they were awarded with the 2009 Captain Arnold Jay Isbell Trophy for Anti-Submarine and Anti-Surface Warfare Excellence.

== 2010 ==
From 19 February to 5 March, HS-14 sent a detachment to Kadena AFB, Okinawa, Japan. During this detachment the squadron flew over 250 hours enhancing their readiness for the 2010 Deployment.

== 2011 ==
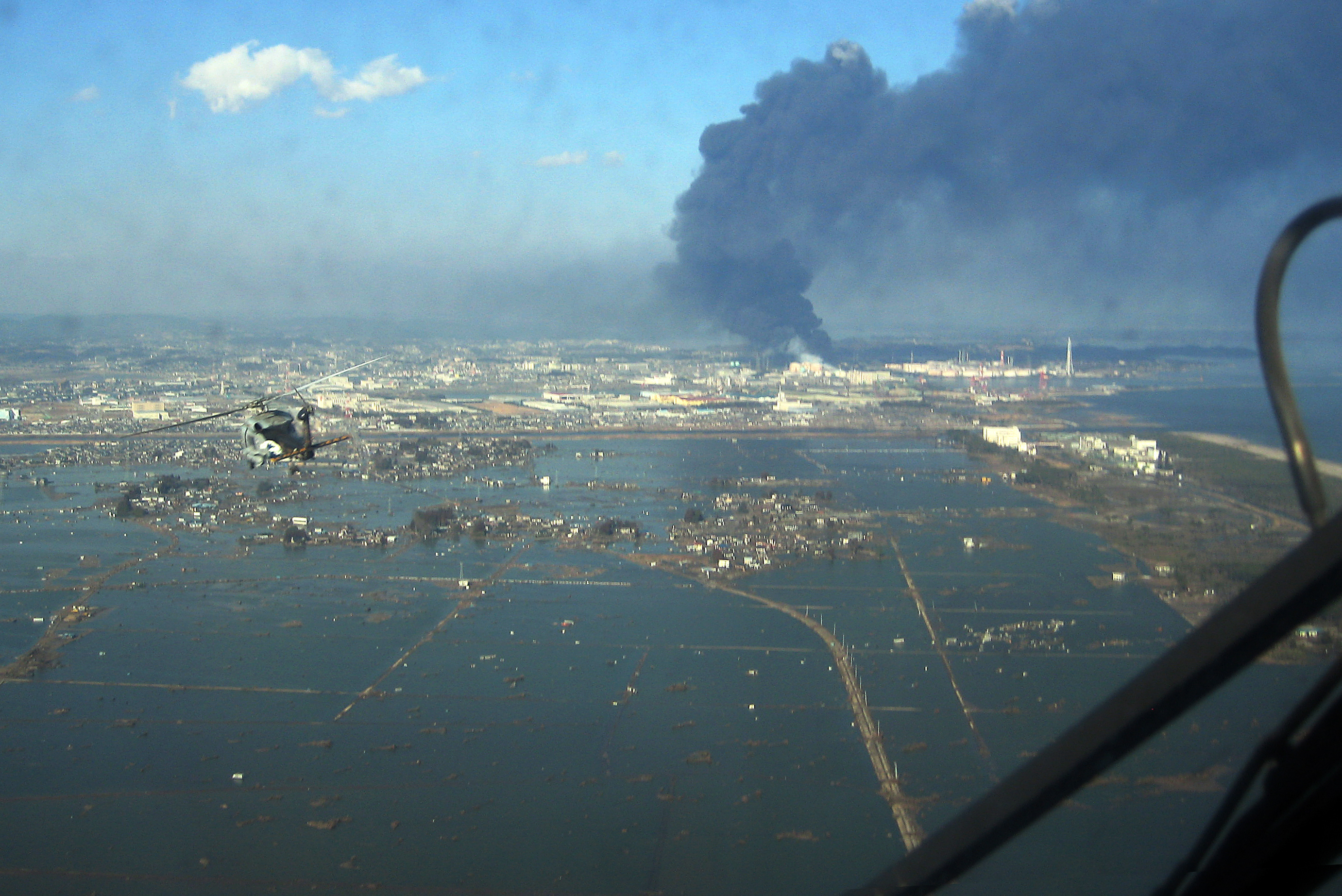
A Sikorsky SH-60 Seahawk of HSC-14 overflying the inundated port of Sendai to deliver food and aid to the city's residents following the 2011 Tōhoku earthquake and tsunami, 12 March 2011

HS-14 and HSL-51 conducted humanitarian flights over Japan since 11 March 2011 as part of Operation Tomodachi from Naval Air Facility Misawa.

== 2013 ==
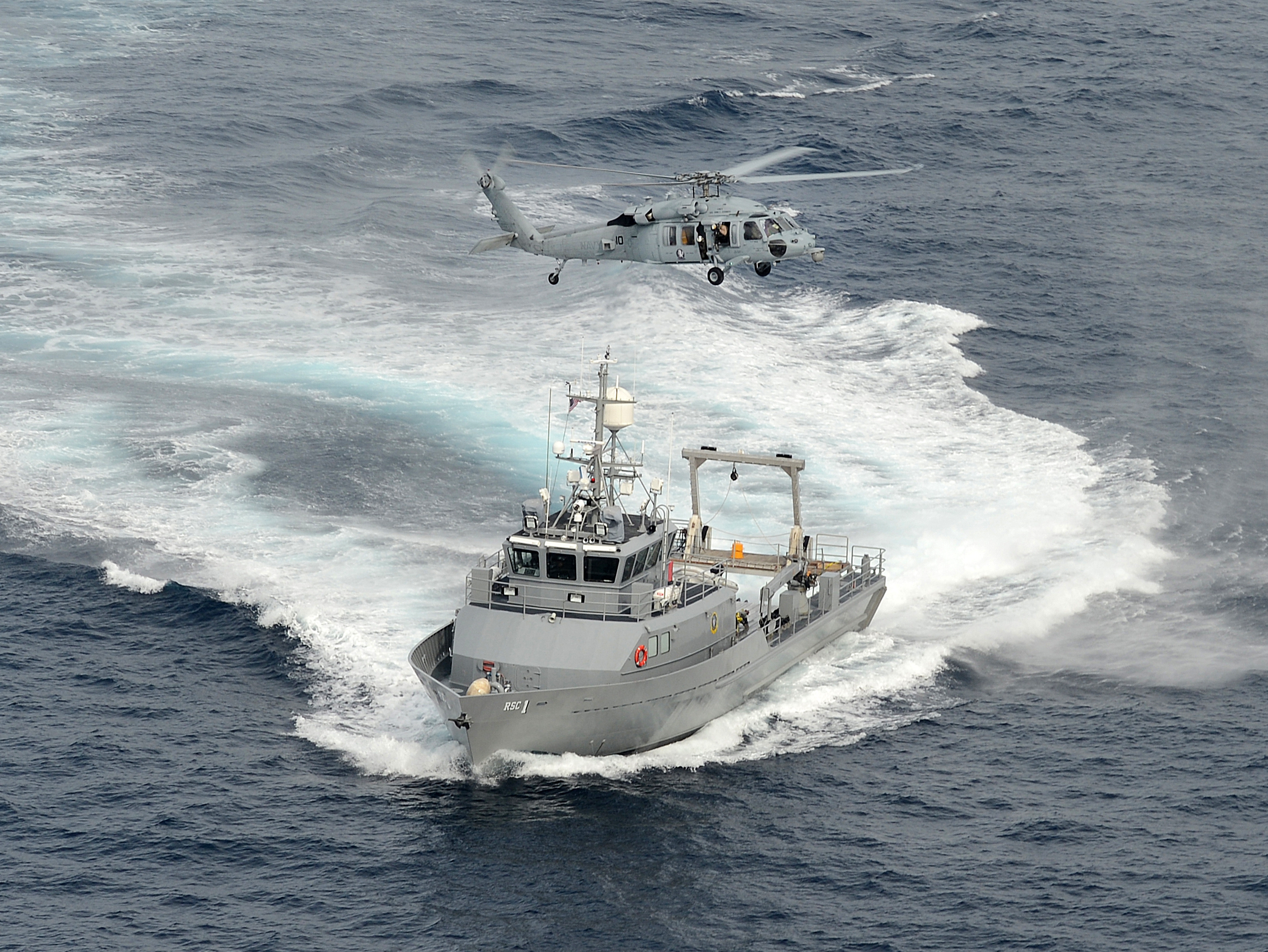
A MH-60S of HSC-14 off San Diego in February 2015

In March 2013, HS-14 left Carrier Air Wing Five (CVW-5) at NAF Atsugi, Japan, and conducted a permanent duty station change to NAS North Island. HS-14 transitioned to the MH-60S Seahawk helicopter and was redesignated Helicopter Sea Combat Squadron FOURTEEN (HSC-14) in July. HSC-14 is currently assigned to Carrier Air Wing Nine (CVW-9) which deploys aboard USS Abraham Lincoln (CVN-72).

== 2026 ==
In late Feb 2026, as part of CVW 9, HSC-14 and their MH-60s operating off the USS Abraham Lincoln, undertook combat sorties within Operation Epic Fury against Iran.

== HS-14 achievements ==
HS-14 celebrated over thirteen years and 50,000 mishap-free flight hours in August 2009. The squadron's impressive history is highlighted by many awards including

- Navy Unit Commendation Medal – 1991 (OPERATION DESERT STORM), 1998 (USS Independence (CV-62))
- Meritorious Unit Commendation Medal – 1989, 1994, and 1996 while attached to CVW-2, USS Ranger (CV-61), and the USS Independence (CV-62) Battle Group
- Seven Battle Efficiency Awards – 1989, 1992, 1998, 1999, 2003, 2004, and 2010
- Armed Forces Expeditionary Medal – 1987, 1989, 1991, 1992, 1998, 1999, and 2003
- Joint Meritorious Unit Award – 1993
- Humanitarian Service Medal – 2001 (USS Gary (FFG-51))
- Southwest Asia Service Medal -1991
- Nine Chief of Naval Operations Safety Awards – 1989, 1991, 1992, 1993, 1998, 1999, 2001, 2006, and 2010
- Two consecutive DESRON SEVEN "Golden Arrow" Awards
- Nine Arnold J. Isbell Awards for ASW and ASUW excellence – 1993, 1999, 2001, 2002, 2003, 2005, 2007, 2009, and 2010
- Admiral John S. Thatch Award for ASW excellence – 2003
- Three CVW-5 Maintenance Excellence "Golden Wrench" Awards – 2nd Qtr. 03, 2nd Qtr. 04, 4th Qtr. 04, 1st Qtr. 06

== See also ==
- History of the United States Navy
- List of United States Navy aircraft squadrons
- Carrier Strike Group Eleven
