= VFA-195 =

Strike Fighter Squadron 195
- Active: 15 August 1943 - present
- Country: United States
- Branch: United States Navy
- Type: Fighter/Attack
- Role: Close air support Air interdiction Aerial reconnaissance
- Part of: Carrier Air Wing Five
- Garrison/HQ: MCAS Iwakuni
- Nickname: "Dambusters"
- Engagements: World War II; Korean War; *Attack on the Sui-ho Dam; Vietnam War; Operation Earnest Will; Gulf War; Operation Southern Watch; Third Taiwan Strait Crisis; Operation Enduring Freedom; Iraq War; Operation Epic Fury

Commanders
- Commanding Officer: CDR Christopher Pollock
- Executive Officer: CDR JD Lape
- Command Master Chief: CMDCM. Eduardo Fragoso

Aircraft flown
- Attack: TBM Avenger; AD-1/A-1 Skyraider; A-4 Skyhawk; A-7 Corsair II
- Fighter: F/A-18A Hornet; F/A-18C/C (Night Attack) Hornet; F/A-18E Super Hornet; F/A-18F Super Hornet

Strike Fighter Squadron 195 (VFA-195), also known as the Dambusters, is a United States Navy F/A-18E Super Hornet fighter squadron stationed at Marine Corps Air Station Iwakuni, Japan. They are a part of Carrier Air Wing Five (CVW-5) and their tail code is NF. Their radio callsign is "Chippy".

== Squadron insignia and nickname ==
The squadron, originally known as the Tigers, had its first insignia approved by Chief of Naval Operations (CNO) on 4 March 1944, consisting of a lion cub riding a torpedo. Bob Burns gave the squadron a lion cub. On the patch the cub is holding the musical "bazooka" that Burns used in his act, while riding a torpedo. The lion went to the Los Angeles Zoo. A new design replaced the cub with a tiger and parrot on the torpedo, and was approved on 18 April 1949.

Sometime in the 1950s, the squadron adopted a shield insignia that featured an eagle's head and a torpedo. On 1 May 1951, squadron aircraft disabled the heavily defended Hwacheon Dam held by North Koreans, earning them the nickname Dambusters, echoing the original Dam Busters of No. 617 Squadron RAF. Destruction of the dam had been previously attempted by other units many times.

In August 1985, the squadron adopted the stylized eagle on green background insignia in use today.

== History ==
=== 1940s ===
Torpedo Squadron 19 (VT-19) was established at NAAS Los Alamitos, California on 15 August 1943, flying the TBM-1 Avenger.

As unit of Carrier Air Group 19 during World War II, it was a part of Admiral Bull Halsey's Naval Task Force. On 18 July 1944, the squadron flew its first combat mission when it conducted pre-invasion strikes against Guam.

The squadron participated in the Battle of Leyte Gulf striking the Japanese Northern Force composed primarily of aircraft carriers, resulting in 25 Navy Cross awards. The squadron supported the landings at Palau, Morotai and Leyte. Squadron pilots also flew strikes against the Carolines, Philippines, Bonin Islands, Okinawa, Mindanao, Luzon, and Formosa while embarked on USS Lexington.

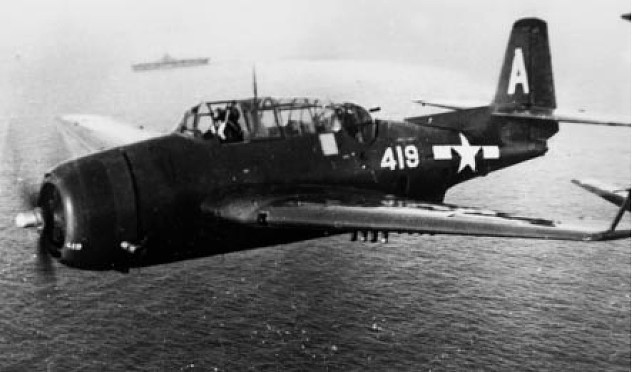
VT-19 TBM-3E in 1946

In October 1944, squadron aircraft participated in strikes against the Central Japanese Task Force in the Sibuyan Sea, which included the super battleship Musashi. Three of the squadron's personnel were awarded the Silver Star for their actions during this strike. On 5 November 1944, squadron aircraft participated in the sinking of Nachi, a Japanese heavy cruiser, which was making a sortie out of Manila Bay.

The squadron changed homeports several times during the Second World War, first to NAS San Diego, then to NAS Alameda, NAAS Santa Rosa, California, and NAS Barbers Point before finally ending up back at NAS Alameda in August 1946. VT-19 also upgraded their Avengers throughout the war, to the TBM-3 in February 1945, the TBM-3E in April 1945, and finally the TBM-3Q.

On 15 November 1946, the squadron was redesignated Attack Squadron 20A (VA-20A). In May 1947, the squadron transitioned to the AD-1 Skyraider. In August 1948, VA-20A upgraded to the AD-2 and was redesignated Attack Squadron 195 (VA-195). In January 1949, the squadron upgraded again to the AD-3.

=== 1950s ===
VA-195 upgraded to the AD-4 in July 1950, and served in the Korean War while embarked on USS Princeton. On 5 December 1950, the squadron flew its first combat mission since the end of World War II, flying close air support missions for U.S. Marines near Chosin Reservoir in North Korea.

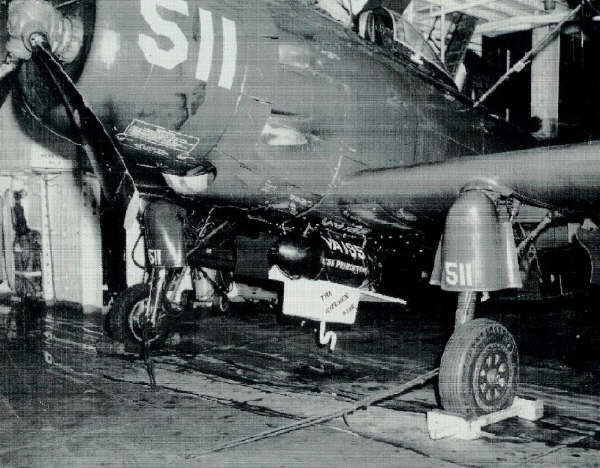
VA-195 "Kitchen Sink Bomb" on an AD-4 in August 1952

On 1 May 1951, the squadron's Skyraiders, making precise low level runs, delivered aerial torpedoes on the heavily defended and strategically positioned Hwacheon Dam in North Korea. Destruction of the dam had been attempted by Air Force and Navy bombers, but was finally accomplished by VA-195, earning them the nickname the Dambusters.

The squadron upgraded to the AD-4L, and on 23 June 1952, the squadron conducted coordinated air strikes against the Suiho hydroelectric plant on the Yalu River and the Kyosen Number Three hydroelectric plant. Squadron aircraft participated in attacks against other hydroelectric plants the following day.

On 11 July 1952, squadron aircraft participated in one of the major joint U.S. Navy, Air Force and Marine Corps air strikes of the war, hitting industrial targets in North Korea's capital city of Pyongyang.

In November 1952, the squadron relocated to NAS Moffett Field, and upgraded to the AD-4B and AD-4NA in early 1953. VA-195 received AD-6s in May 1954, and finally moved to the jet age with A4D-2 Skyhawks (later designated A-4B) in July 1959.

=== 1960s ===
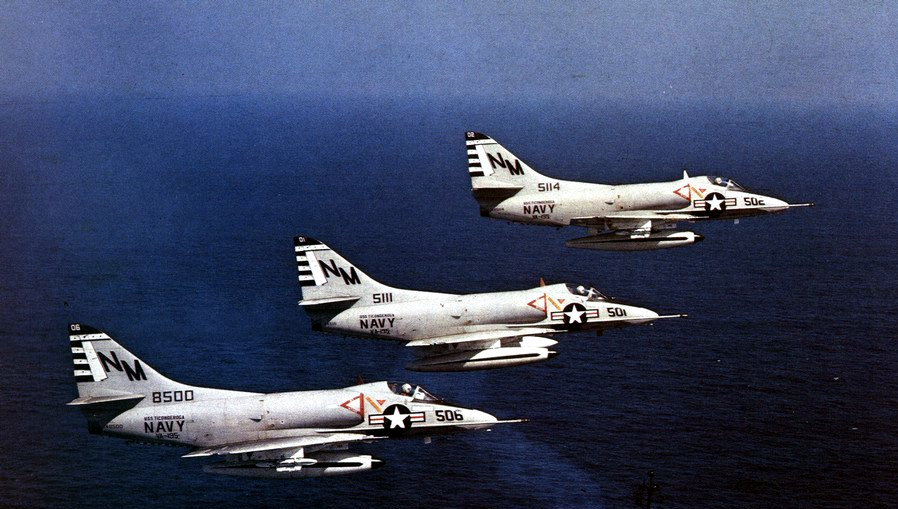
Several A-4C Skyhawks of VA-195 in 1968.

In December 1961, the squadron moved to NAS Lemoore, California. As the Vietnam War flared in the fall of 1964, the squadron made their fourth consecutive deployments on USS Bon Homme Richard. During the next five years, while operating various models of the A-4 from the decks of Bon Homme Richard and USS Ticonderoga, the squadron logged more combat flight hours and sorties than any other squadron in Carrier Air Wing 19 (CVW-19).

On 20 April 1967, the squadron's executive officer was awarded the Silver Star for his actions in planning and executing a successful strike against a Haiphong thermal power plant, accomplishing the mission without the loss of a single aircraft.

In March 1968, VA-195, along with other squadrons in CVW-19, conducted flight operations from USS Ticonderoga in the Sea of Japan following the capture of USS Pueblo by North Korea. In September 1968, the squadron upgraded to the A-4E.

=== 1970s ===
In early 1970 VA-195 transitioned to the A-7E Corsair II. As a unit of Carrier Air Wing 11 on USS Kitty Hawk, the squadron deployed in late 1970, marking its fourth consecutive decade of involvement in foreign conflicts. In May 1972, the squadron participated in Operation Pocket Money, the mining of North Vietnamese harbours and Operation Linebacker, concentrated air strikes against targets in North Vietnam above the 20th parallel. On 19 July 1972 the squadron delivered the first data link version of the television guided Walleye Glide Bomb into a cave storage area causing its complete destruction. Later the same day, they destroyed the Ninh Bình railroad bridge, also with a single weapon.

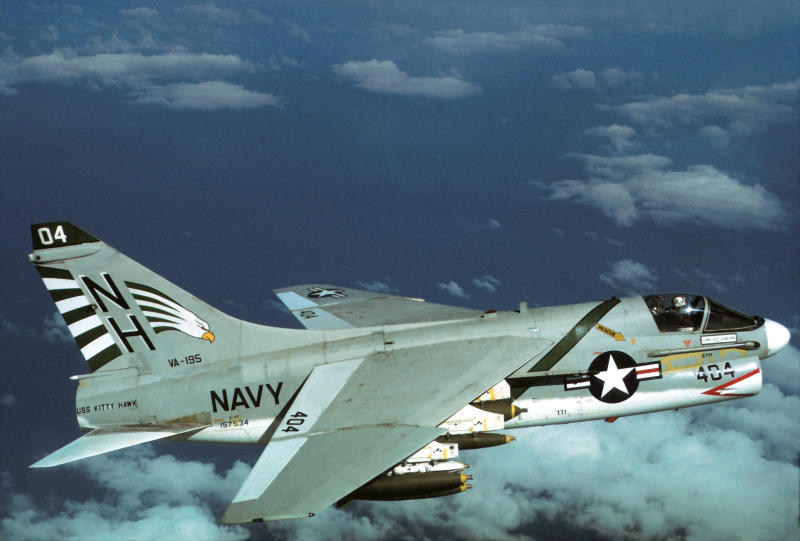
VA-195 A-7E over North Vietnam in 1970

In November 1973, VA-195 deployed with CVW-11 embarked on USS Kitty Hawk as part of the first CV concept air wing deployment on the West Coast. This concept consolidated all aspects of carrier aviation warfare into one air wing deployed on an aircraft carrier. The most important difference was the integration of the anti-submarine squadrons (VS) into the former Attack Carrier Air Wing, as the old Essex-class anti-submarine carriers (CVS) and their Anti-Submarine Carrier Air Groups (CVSG) were retired.

Between 1970 and 1981 VA-195 made seven deployments with CVW-11 aboard USS Kitty Hawk. The 1979 deployment led CVW-11 in unfamiliar waters, as it was deployed to the Mediterranean Sea, followed by the 1981 cruise to the same area and the Indian Ocean.

=== 1980s ===
In 1981, the squadron made back-to-back deployments aboard USS America. In 1983/84 VA-195 made its last deployment with the A-7 Corsair II, this time being reassigned to the Pacific Fleet CVW-9 aboard USS Ranger. From July to August 1983, USS Ranger was ordered to operate off the coast of Nicaragua in response to an unstable situation in Central America. Then, from October 1983 to January 1984, during a 122-day line period in the Indian Ocean, USS Ranger was extended on station in the Arabian Sea due to the Iranian threat to block oil exports from the Persian Gulf.

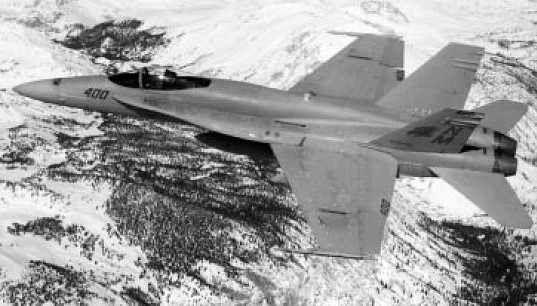
NM-400, an VFA-195 F/A-18A in 1986 while assigned to CVW-10.

VA-195 was redesignated Strike Fighter Squadron 195 (VFA-195) on 1 April 1985 and commenced transition to the F/A-18A Hornet. The first of 12 new Lot 8 F/A-18As were delivered to the squadron in October, 1985. In 1986 VFA-195 was assigned to the newly established CVW-10. This wing was to deploy on USS Independence CV-62, and it was given the old CVW-19 tail code "NM". However, CVW-10 was never deployed. VFA-195 was the only squadron of this wing that was not disestablished in 1987. Instead, VFA-195 was reassigned to CVW-5 aboard USS Midway CV-41, when CVW-5's fighter squadrons transitioned from the F-4S Phantom II and the A-7E Corsair to the F/A-18 Hornet. VFA-195 joined the Forward Deployed Naval Forces in U.S. Fleet Activities Yokosuka, Japan with the first aircraft arriving at NAF Atsugi on 14 November 1986.

In 1987, the squadron completed two short Westpac cruises aboard USS Midway, from January to 20 March and 23 April to 13 July, with port calls in Subic Bay, Philippines, Hong Kong, and Sydney, Australia. From November 1987 to February 1988, the squadron participated in Operation Earnest Will, the escorting of reflagged Kuwaiti tankers through the Persian Gulf. In late 1988 and again in 1989, the squadron embarked aboard USS Midway and made deployments to the Indian Ocean, along with several shorter deployments in the Western Pacific.

=== 1990s ===
VFA-195 was deployed aboard USS Midway when Iraq invaded Kuwait in August 1990. During Operations Desert Shield and Desert Storm the squadron flew 564 combat missions, delivering 356 tons of ordnance. During the war (possibly on 24 January 1991) VFA-195 became the first Hornet squadron and first CVW-5 squadron to deliver a Walleye II glide bomb in combat during an air strike against the Iraqi Navy's HQ at Umm Qasr. During the strike, LCDR. Jeffery S. Ashby guided his Walleye II into the T-shaped building at Umm Qasr Naval Base. The next day, F-14s equipped with TARPS confirmed the Walleye hit was a success and a strike that was planned the next day was cancelled.

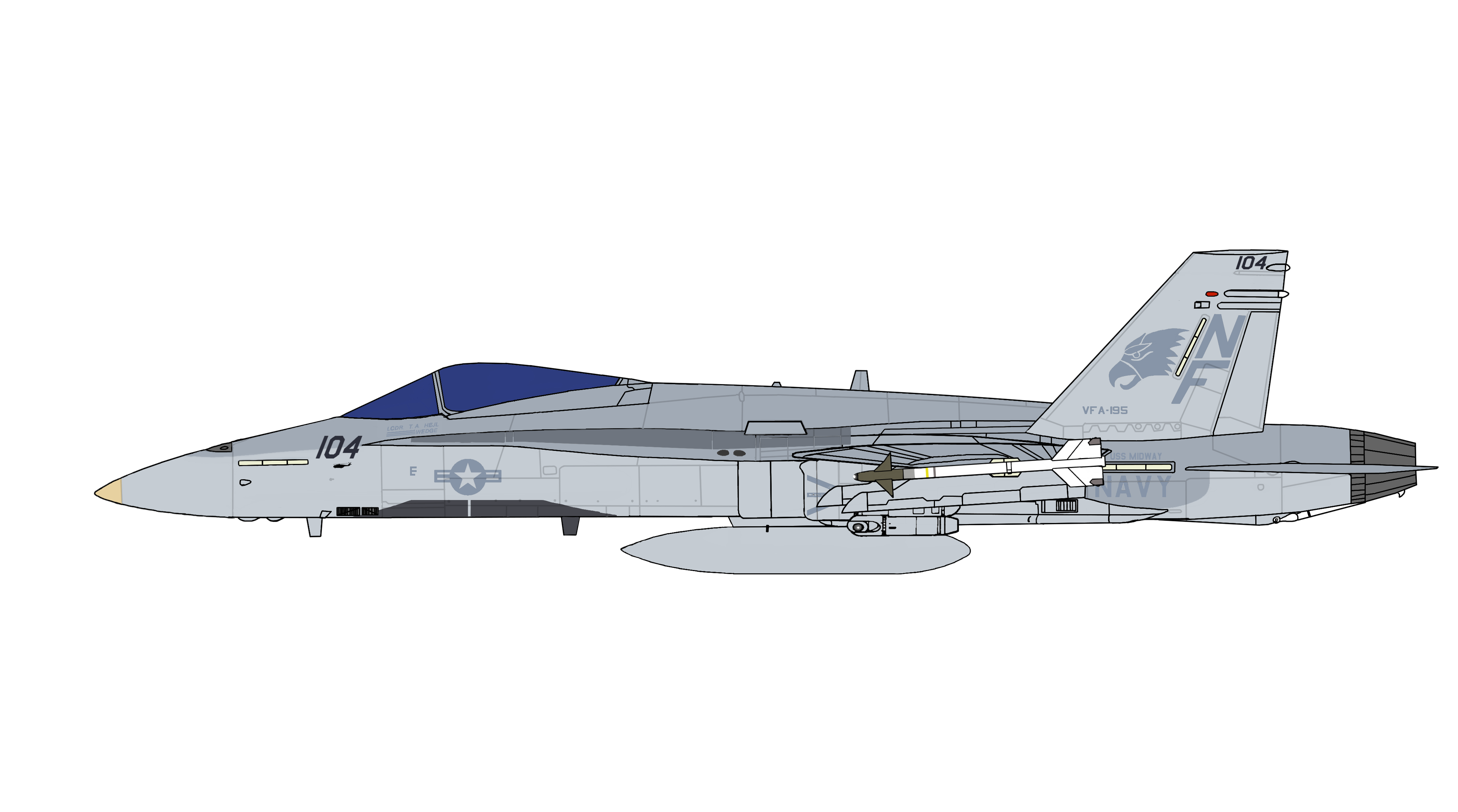
NF-104 which had the kill marking of a Super Frelon, destroyed by LCDR. Jeff S. Ashby with a Walleye I (who was also the first F/A-18 pilot to use the Walleye II in combat).

About three to four weeks into the war, LCDR. Ashby was about to lead a major six to eight plane strike against a communications building in the northern end of Basra, Iraq. Intelligence had been alerted by the presence of an Iraqi Super Frelon Helicopter fitted with Exocet ASM missiles.

On 13 February 1991, LCDR. Ashby flying NF-104 and another Hornet from VFA-195 found the helicopter in the desert, with Ashby destroying it with a Walleye I. NF-104 would later have a kill marking of the Super Frelon applied to the aircraft when it was displayed at the WINGS 1991 airshow in Japan.

On 10 August 1991, CVW-5 sailed with USS Midway for the last time, arriving in Hawaii on 22 August to swap with the new forward deployed carrier, USS Independence which had CVW-14. During the 'Great Carrier Air Wing SwapEx', VFA-195 transitioned to the F/A-18C Hornet and stayed with CVW-5.

On 15 April 1992, VFA-195 deployed to the Persian Gulf with CVW-5 on the Independence. Along the way, in June, VFA-195 sent one of the Hornets to Doha, Qatar as well as conducting DACT with the Qatar Air Force. On 23 August 1992, Operation Southern Watch began as CVW-5 was the first US Navy unit to take part. On 11 October 1992, VFA-195 returned back to Atsugi, with one of their F/A-18C's (NF-403) being painted with a special white eagle on the tail. In February 1993, VFA-195 took part in Exercise Team Spirit '93 with South Korea while in the Sea of Japan. In September, they also participated in ANNUALEX '93 with the JMSDF.

In March 1996, CVW-5 and VFA-195 deployed to calm tensions in the Taiwan Strait over Taiwan's first direct presidential elections. On 27 March, VFA-195 and CVW-5 returned back to Atsugi after the Third Taiwan Strait Crisis.

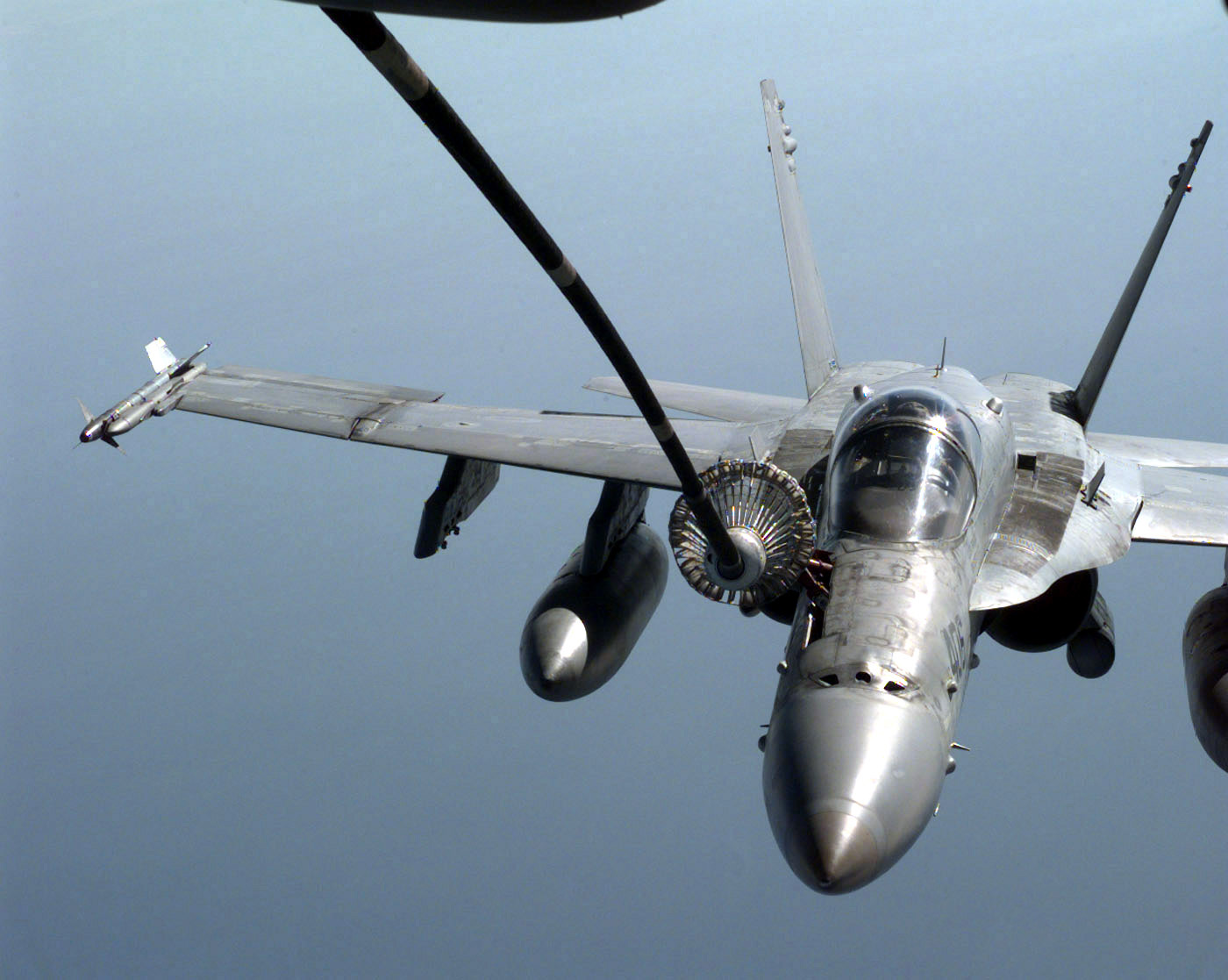
An F/A-18C Hornet (NF-406) from VFA-195 refuels during Operation Southern Watch in 1998.

On 18 May, VFA-195 along with CVW-5 departed with the Independence to take part in RIMPAC 1996 which ended on 18 June. From 10 March – 22 March 1997, VFA-195 and the Independence took part in Exercise Tandem Thrust '97 with the Australian military. Between 16 and 20 October 1997, VFA-195 also took part in Foal Eagle '97 with South Korea before taking part in ANNUALEX 09G between 6 and 12 November 1997 with the JSDF.

After a visit by U.S. Secretary of Defense William Cohen to the Independence while in-port on 21 January 1998, the Carrier along with VFA-195 and CVW-5 deployed on 23 January to take part in Operation Southern Watch, as announced by Cohen when he visited. This deployment would however be the last deployment made with the Independence. VFA-195 arrived in the Persian Gulf on 5 February, before engaging in OSW. After four months, VFA-195 returned to NAF Atsugi on 5 June 1998.

On 7 July 1998, the Independence, CVW-5 and VFA-195 left Japan to swap with the Kitty Hawk, which was to become the new home of CVW-5. The Independence arrived at Pearl Harbor on 17 July. During the cross-deck, VFA-195 replaced its F/A-18Cs with the F/A-18C (N) Night Attack Hornet. At 7:00AM on 24 July 1998, VFA-195 and CVW-5 along with the Kitty Hawk departed Pearl Harbor for Japan while the Independence went into retirement in the Puget Sound, Washington State. VFA-195 arrived back on 11 August.

=== 2000s ===
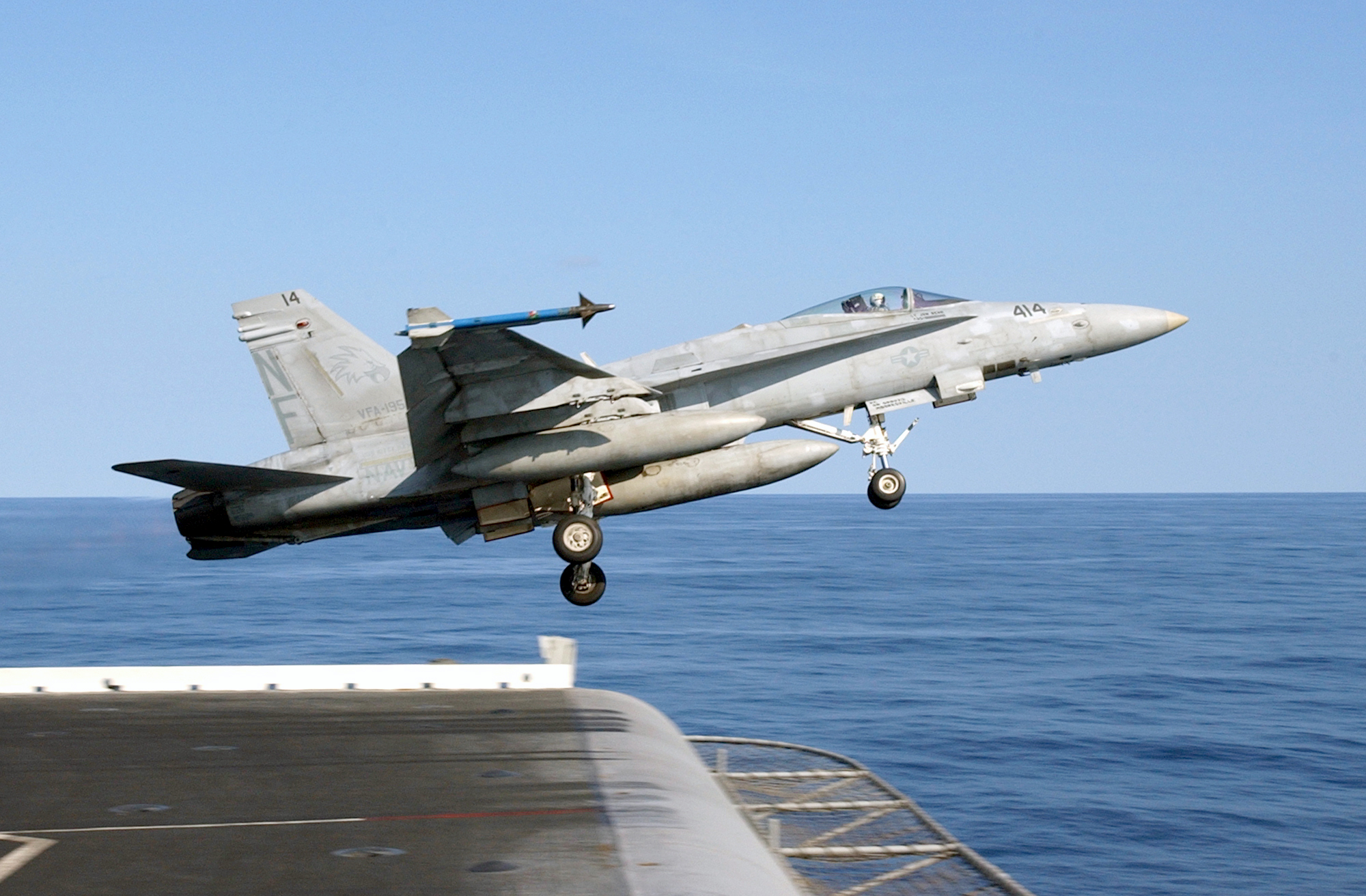
NF-414, an F/A-18C (N) from VFA-195 launches from the Kitty Hawk on 31 Jan 2003 in the Sea of Japan.

VFA-195 flew in support of Operation Enduring Freedom in 2001, striking targets deep in Afghanistan.

VFA-195 called on for duty when on 23 January 2003, VFA-195 deployed off the coast of North Korea in the face of tensions over the latter's nuclear weapons program, as well as preventing North Korea from taking advantage of the deployment of US forces to the Persian Gulf that year. In February, VFA-195 and the Kitty Hawk headed to the Persian Gulf to take part in Southern Watch for the last time. On 19 March 2003, as part of the first night attacks of Operation Iraqi Freedom, eight F/A-18C (N)s from VFA-195 along with F-14As from VF-154 and Night Attack Hornets from VFA-192 attacked SAM sites in Western Iraq.

On 2 April 2003, NF-405, an F/A-18C (N) from VFA-195; was shot down by a Patriot PAC-2 SAM Site in a Friendly Fire incident while in support of Coalition Forces approaching Baghdad, killing the pilot, Lieutenant Nathan D. White. The squadron would go on to fly 278 combat sorties in support of Iraqi Freedom, delivered 179,000 pounds of precision guided munitions against military targets over the course of a single month. On 23 April 2003, Iraqi Freedom was over for VFA-195, CVW-5 and the Kitty Hawk, heading back to Japan from then on.

Starting on 7 May 2004, as a result of VFA-27 transitioning to the F/A-18E Super Hornet, VFA-27's F/A-18C (N)s were given to VFA-192. As a result, VFA-195 received VFA-192 Night Attack Hornets as well as VMFA-212 at MCAS Iwakuni. On 19 July, VFA-195 and the rest of CVW-5 as well as the Kitty Hawk deployed to the Western Pacific to take part in Summer Pulse 2004, a Naval Exercise involving 7 Carrier Battle Groups including the Kitty Hawk CVBG. During the Exercise, VFA-195 and CVW-5 worked alongside the John C. Stennis and CVW-14, taking part in JASEX 04, 600 nm east of Ioshima.

Departing on 8 June 2006 for another deployment in the Pacific, VFA-195 took part in Exercise Valiant Shield 2006 between 19 and 23 June 2006 with the USMC and USAF (including the B-2A Spirit). Around a year later, the squadron took part in Valiant Shield 2007. That same year, they also took part in Exercise Malabar 07-2 with CVW-11, the Royal Australian Navy, JSMDF, The Republic of Singapore Navy and the Indian Navy, which ended on 9 September.

On 28 May 2008 USS Kitty Hawk left Yokosuka for the last time, heading for Pearl Harbor along with CVW-5 and VFA-195, the latter two of which were preparing to move to USS George Washington CVN-73. The Kitty Hawk, CVW-5 and VFA-195 firstly arrived at Hawaii on 1 July, before taking part in RIMPAC 2008 on 8 July. They then returned back to Hawaii before departing for San Diego on 1 August 2008. VFA-195 and the rest of CVW-5 flew off the Kitty Hawk on 6 August before it arrived on 7 August in San Diego. This was the first time since 1986 that VFA-195 had been on the Mainland US. VFA-195 and the rest of CVW-5 then transitioned to the George Washington and left on 20 August for Yokosuka. On 25 September 2008, VFA-195 arrived back in Japan.

In March 2009, VFA-195 sent six of their aircraft along with VFA-27, who sent eight of theirs to take part in Cope Tiger 2009 in Thailand with the Thai Armed Forces, Singapore and USAF.

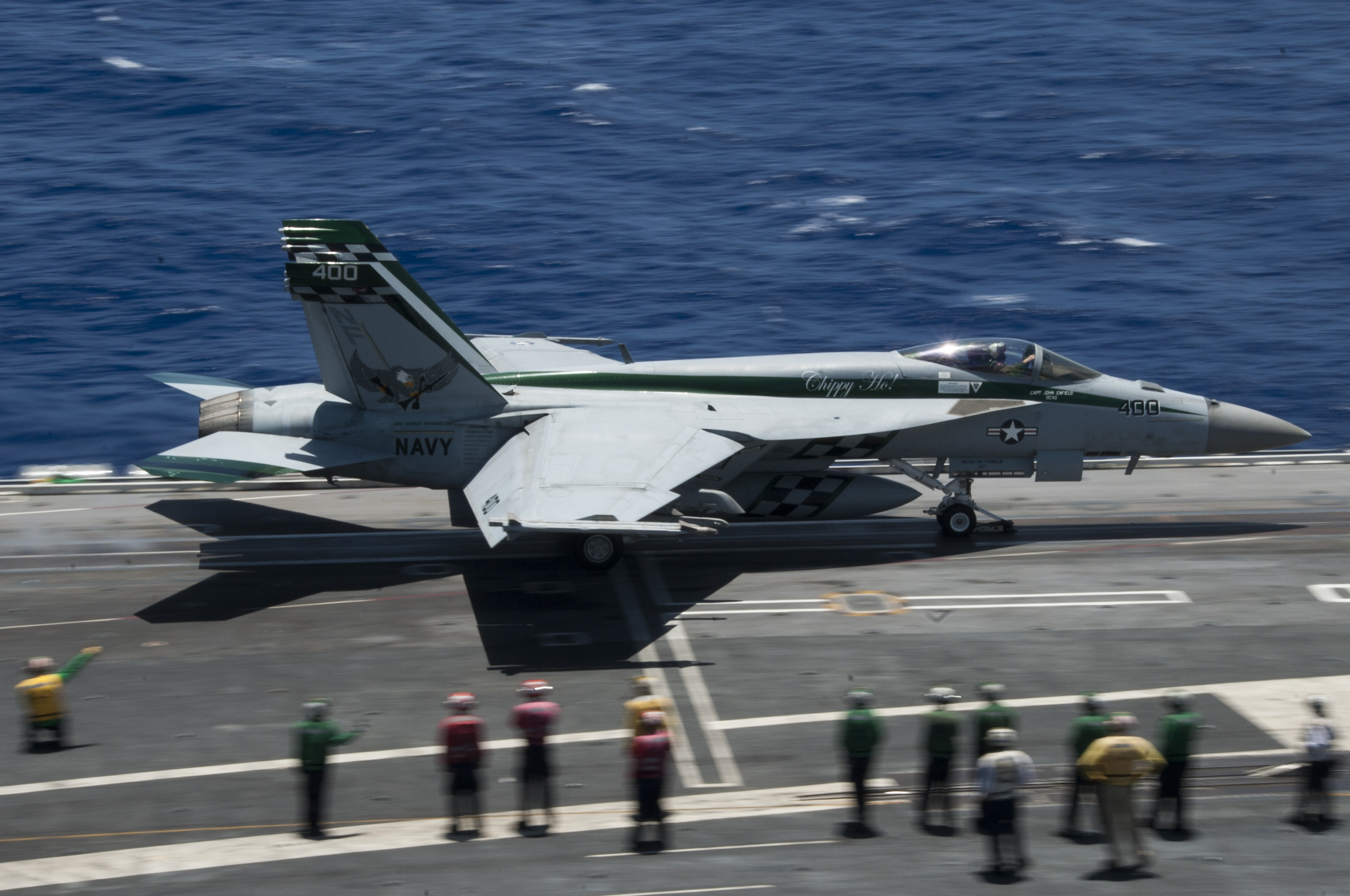
VFA-195 F/A-18E launches from USS George Washington in May 2015

=== 2010s ===
During late 2010 the squadron transitioned to the F/A-18E Super Hornet. In late 2015, CVW-5 was scheduled to be transferred to USS Ronald Reagan which replaced USS George Washington as the U.S. Navy's forward deployed aircraft carrier at Yokosuka, Japan.

=== 2020s ===
In February 2026, VFA-195 received its first Block III advanced Super Hornets. Then in May, the squadron received its first F/A-18F, officially making them the first FDNF composite squadron. VFA-195 accepted their first WSO shortly thereafter.

== See also ==
- Naval aviation
- Modern US Navy carrier air operations
- List of United States Navy aircraft squadrons
- List of Inactive United States Navy aircraft squadrons
