= USS Gary (FFG-51) =

Oliver Hazard Perry-class frigate

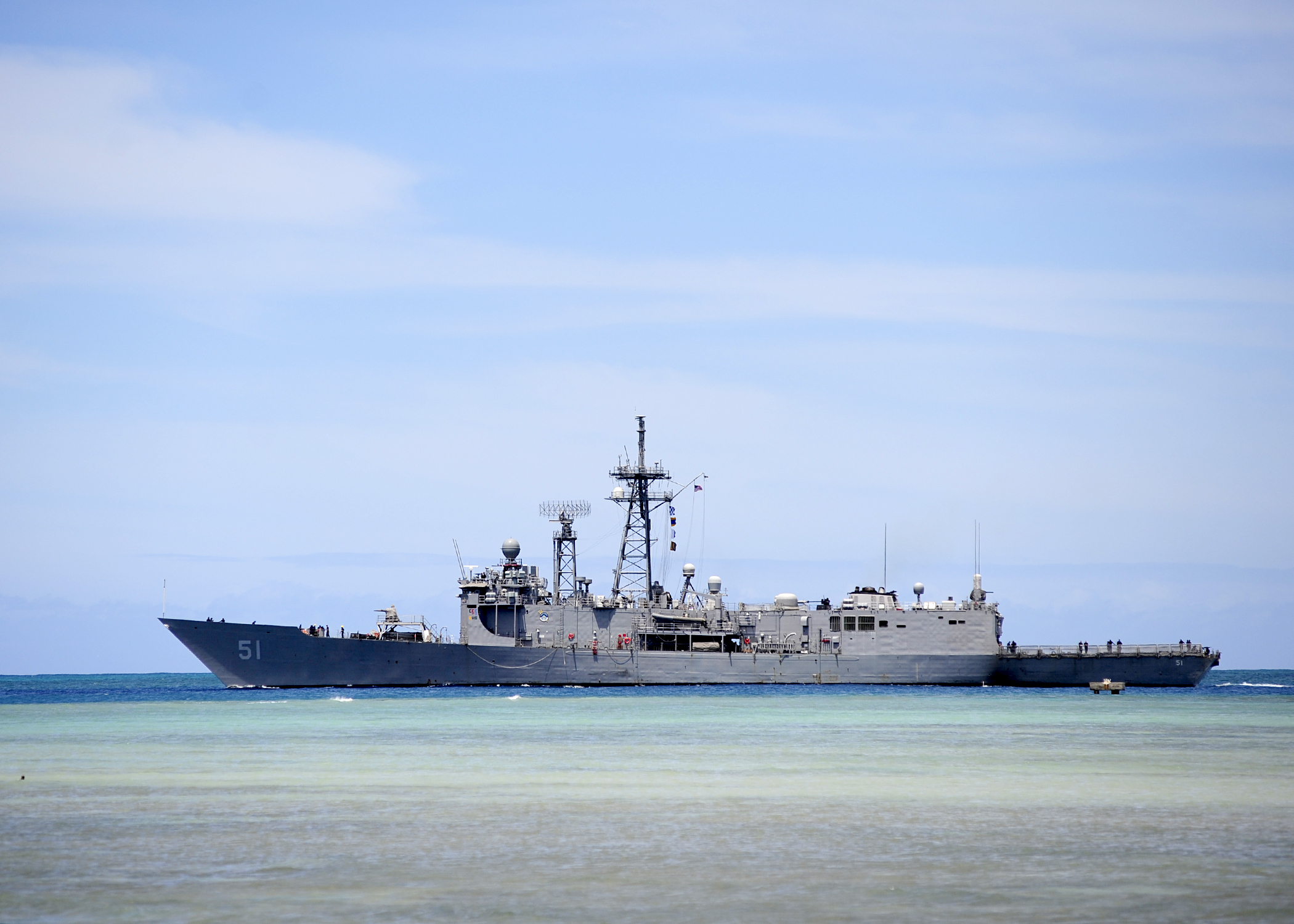
- USS Gary (FFG-51), leaves Pearl Harbor in July 2014.

History

United States
- Name: Gary
- Namesake: Commander Donald A. Gary
- Awarded: 22 May 1981
- Builder: Todd Pacific Shipyards, Los Angeles Division, San Pedro, California
- Laid down: 18 December 1982
- Launched: 19 November 1983
- Commissioned: 17 November 1984
- Decommissioned: 5 August 2015
- Identification: Hull symbol: FFG-51; Code letters: NDAG
- Motto: "Freedom's Foremost Guardian"
- Nickname(s): "Two Guns"
- Fate: Sold to Republic of China
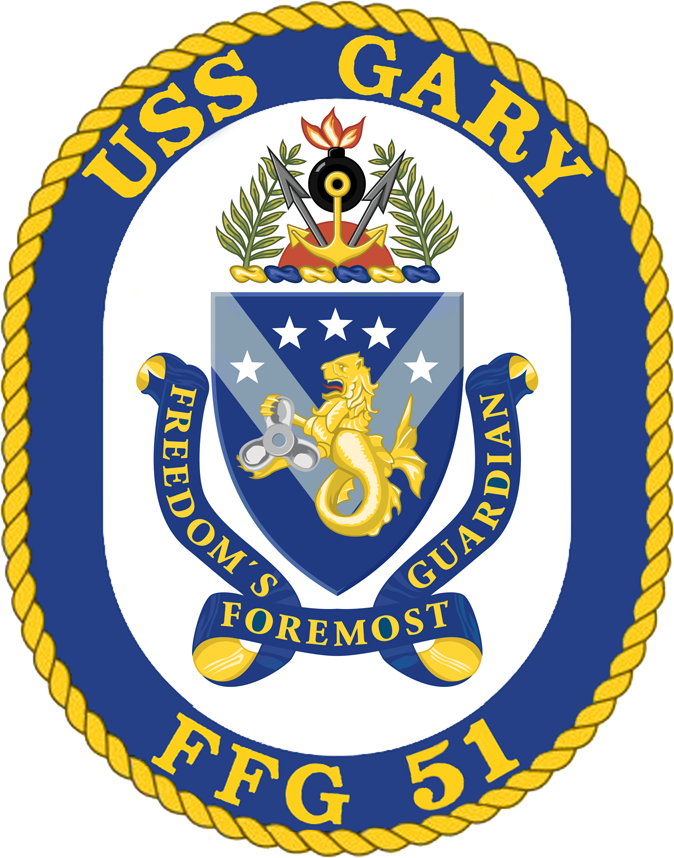
- Badge

Republic of China
- Name: Feng Jia; (逢甲)
- Namesake: Chiu Feng-chia
- Acquired: 13 March 2017
- Commissioned: 8 November 2018
- Identification: Pennant number: PFG-1115
- Status: in active service

General characteristics
- Class & type: Oliver Hazard Perry-class frigate
- Displacement: 4,100 long tons (4,200 t), full load
- Length: 453 feet (138 m), overall
- Beam: 45 feet (14 m)
- Draft: 22 feet (6.7 m)
- Propulsion: 2 × General Electric LM2500-30 gas turbines generating 41,000 shp (31 MW) through a single shaft and variable pitch propeller; 2 × Auxiliary Propulsion Units, 350 hp (260 kW) retractable electric azimuth thrusters for maneuvering and docking.
- Speed: over 29 knots (54 km/h)
- Range: 5,000 nautical miles at 18 knots (9,300 km at 33 km/h)
- Complement: 15 officers and 190 enlisted, plus SH-60 LAMPS detachment of roughly six officer pilots and 15 enlisted maintainers
- Sensors & processing systems: AN/SPS-49 air-search radar; AN/SPS-55 surface-search radar; CAS and STIR fire-control radar; AN/SQS-56 sonar.
- Electronic warfare & decoys: AN/SLQ-32
- Armament: As built: 1 × OTO Melara Mk 75 76 mm/62 caliber naval gun; 2 × Mk 32 triple-tube (324 mm) launchers for Mark 46 torpedoes; 1 × Vulcan Phalanx CIWS; 4 × .50-cal (12.7 mm) machine guns.; 1 × Mk 13 Mod 4 single-arm launcher for Harpoon anti-ship missiles and SM-1MR Standard anti-ship/air missiles (40 round magazine); Note: As of 2004, Mk 13 systems removed from all active US vessels of this class.**However, the Mk 13 Mod 4 single-arm launcher has been removed (as with all other US Navy frigates) due to the weapons system becoming obsolete.
- Aircraft carried: 2 × SH-60 LAMPS III helicopters
- Aviation facilities: 2 × hangars; RAST helicopter hauldown system

USS Gary (FFG-51) was an Oliver Hazard Perry-class frigate in the United States Navy. She was named for Medal of Honor recipient Commander Donald A. Gary (1903–1977).

Gary was laid down on 18 December 1982 at Todd Pacific Shipyards, Los Angeles Division, San Pedro, California; launched on 19 November 1983, co-sponsored by Mrs. Dorothy G. Gary, widow of the late Cmdr. Gary, and Mrs. Joyce Leamer, the late Medal of Honor recipient's niece; and commissioned on 17 November 1984 at Naval Station Long Beach. The Gary was decommissioned from the US Navy on 5 August 2015 with the Taiwanese crew taking possession on 13 March 2017, and arrived at the ROCN Zuoying Naval Base on 13 May. She was formally commissioned into ROCN as the ROCS Feng Jia (PFG-1115) on 8 November 2018.

== Background ==
Gary is the forty-fifth ship of the Oliver Hazard Perry-class of guided missile frigates. These ships were built to provide air, surface and sub-surface protection for underway replenishment groups, convoys, amphibious groups and other military and merchant shipping. While a capable surface combatant in these traditional warfare areas, Gary's role has expanded from that of the early 1980s to meet the threats and contingencies of the 21st century. Being the smallest multi-mission surface combatant in the U.S. Navy, Gary's shallow draft gives her an advantage over larger cruisers and destroyers in the littoral operations that have characterized recent conflicts.

Gary's engineering plant is computer-controlled and monitored, reducing the number of watchstanders required in the engineering spaces themselves. Two marine gas turbine engines provide propulsion. Digital electronic logic circuits and remotely operated valves are monitored in a central control station and make Gary capable of getting ready to get underway in less than ten minutes rather than the eight hours required by steam-powered ships.

One of the U.S. Navy's premiere anti-submarine warfare platforms, Gary routinely deploys for bilateral anti-submarine exercises and real-world contingency operations in the western Pacific and Indian Oceans. During Operation Iraqi Freedom, she displayed her versatility, deploying to the Arabian Sea, Persian Gulf, Gulf of Aden and Red Sea, conducting carrier escort and air defense, intelligence gathering and presence missions, terrorist interdiction operations, rescue at sea and escorted dozens of merchant and military supply ships through the Strait of Hormuz and Bab-el-Mandeb strait. From 1999 to 2007, Gary was forward-deployed to Yokosuka, Japan, as part of the United States Seventh Fleet. During 2007, Gary completed a hull-swap/crew-swap with McCampbell (DDG-85) and to be home-ported at Naval Station, San Diego.

== Notable history ==
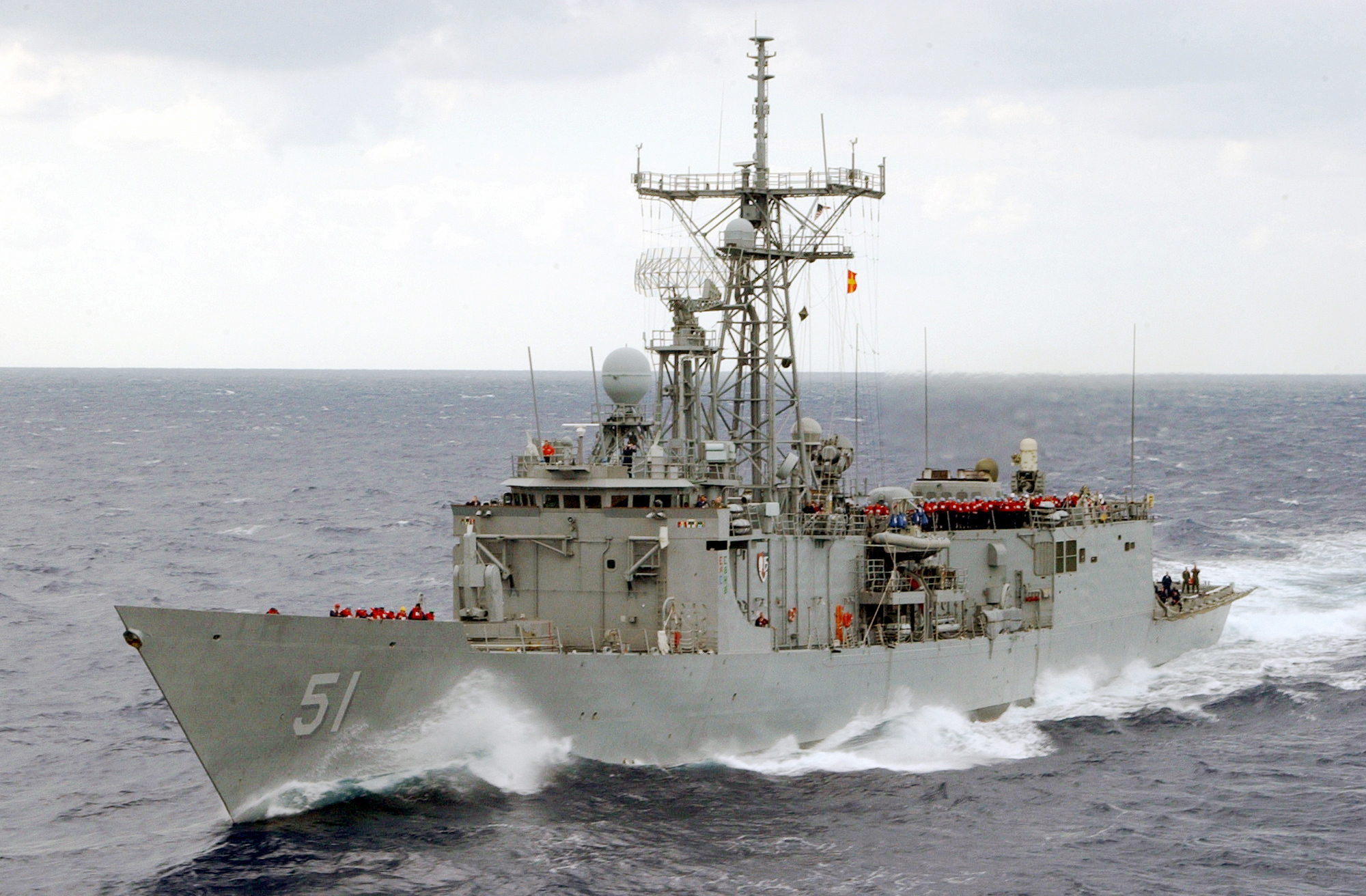
Gary in 2002, before removal of her missile launcher.

An Iranian mine damaged guided missile frigate Samuel B. Roberts in the Persian Gulf on 14 April 1988. On 18 April the U.S. launched retaliatory Operation Praying Mantis against the Iranian-occupied Rakhsh, Salman (Sassan), and Sīrrī-D (Nassr) oil platforms. As the Task Unit Commander of joint forces in the Northern Persian Gulf, Gary coordinated her efforts with naval, Air Force and Army aircraft as well as special operations boat units while protecting Mobile Sea Bases Hercules and Wimbrown VII during the fighting. She even claimed to have shot down a Silkworm missile, but this was never officially credited nor was she officially commended for her actions due to political reasons at that time. All sailors and Marines aboard Gary were awarded the Combat Action Ribbon in June 2025.

While aircraft carrier Kitty Hawk, guided missile destroyer Curtis Wilbur, and Gary, with an embarked an SH-60B Seahawk of Helicopter Antisubmarine Squadron (Light) (HSL) 51 Detachment 5, passed through the Strait of Malacca, en route to the Indian Ocean, on 7 October 2001, they rescued five Indonesian fishermen from their sinking 40-foot fishing vessel.

On 13 March 2003, Gary, with an SH-60B of HSL-51 embarked, assisted in the rescue of all eight Iraqi fishermen from dhow Kaptain Muhamadat when she lost steerage and propulsion in heavy seas and capsized 20 miles south of the Iranian coast.

On 9 February 2007 Gary docked at the Cambodian port of Sihanoukville. It is the first time since the Vietnam War that an American warship has docked in Cambodia.

In the summers of 2012 and 2014, Gary took part in the largest Rim of the Pacific multi-national naval exercise including 23 nations and over 40 ships.

While Gary, with a Coast Guard law enforcement detachment team embarked, deployed for Operation Martillo (Spanish for "Hammer"), a counter-narcotics patrol, in the Eastern Pacific Ocean, she intercepted a suspicious vessel on 4 January 2013. The Coast Guardsmen and Sailors from the ship's "visit, board, search, and seizure" (VBSS) team boarded the suspected smuggler and seized 600 pounds (270 kg) of cocaine with an estimated street value of $22 million. "This was one of those vessels we were chasing in the dark," Leatrice Daniels, Gary's embarked Naval Criminal Investigative Service (NCIS) agent explained, "There was great open communication with everybody involved. Everything just flowed, from pursuit to initial contact and boarding." The investigators deemed the smuggler a hazard to navigation and sank her. This case concluded a hectic week in which Gary's crewmembers and Coast Guardsmen boarded three boats, disrupting more than 2,000 pounds (910 kg) of cocaine destined for the United States with a street value of $272 million.

On the night of 8 January 2013, Gary encountered a small vessel loaded with cargo. The boat displayed several indicators that she was involved in illicit trafficking, and the VBSS team and the Coast Guardsmen boarded the vessel. While they searched the boat, she suffered a temporary steering casualty, rendering her dangerous to operate. Gary rigged a tow until the Americans and the mariners restored the boat's steering. The intervening time enabled the boarders to complete their search and they failed to discover any narcotics on board, and the vessel resumed her voyage two days later. The ship capped her deployment by seizing an additional vessel smuggling more than 2,200 pounds (1,000 kg) of cocaine valued at $81 million. "It was a complex operation," Lt. (j.g.) Christian Gotcher, the ship's navigation officer, recalled, "involving a law enforcement boarding, boat and helicopter searches, precision driving, detainee handling, and multiple deck operations, but Gary's crew proved they were fully capable of handling it and scored a big win."

Gary was decommissioned on 23 July 2015 at Naval Base San Diego, California.

=== Republic of China Navy ===
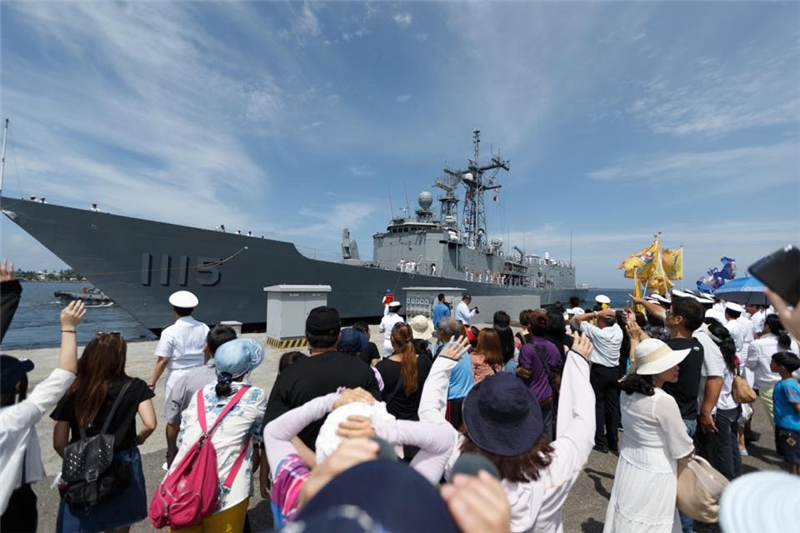
ROCS Feng Jia

Gary was inactivated on 5 August 2015 and then prepared for transfer to Republic of China, Taiwan. The Republic of China Navy inaugurated the ship as the ROCS Feng Jia (逢甲, PFG-1115) on November 8, 2018. Mk13 was reinstalled before being transferred to the Republic of China.
