= HS-12 =

Helicopter Anti-Submarine Warfare Squadron 12
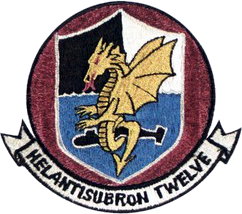
- Active: 1977-1994
- Country: United States
- Branch: United States Navy
- Type: Helicopter Anti-Submarine Warfare Squadron
- Garrison/HQ: NAF Atsugi, Japan (CVW-5)
- Nickname(s): Wyverns
- Engagements: Cold War, Operation Desert Storm

Aircraft flown
- Helicopter: SH-3H Sea King

Helicopter Anti-Submarine Warfare Squadron 12 (HS-12) the Wyverns was a former ASW helicopter Squadron of the U.S. Navy between 1977 and 1994.

== History ==
=== Early years (1977–1989) ===
HS-12 was established on 15 July 1977 as part of the U.S. Pacific Fleet. Being the newest HS squadron at the time, it became the first to fly the TACNAV equipped SH-3H Sea King. That same year, the squadron sent a 2 detachments to the USS Paul F. Foster for trials on whether the Spruance Class destroyer could operate the Sea King Helicopter. Their first carrier deployment came in 1979 aboard the USS America as part of CVW-11 in the Mediterranean. During 1980, the squadron took part in exercises while based in NAS North Island which included 2 detachments sent to the USS Constellation (CV-64) and USS Kitty Hawk (CV-63). A second deployment with the America and CVW-11 in 1981 followed which included the rescue of 15 shipmates at sea.

In 1982, HS-12 became the first ASW helicopter squadron to be assigned on the older Midway Class Carrier USS Coral Sea (CV-43) when they moved to CVW-14. In 1983, a world cruise from Alameda in San Francisco to Norfolk took place on the Coral Sea with HS-12 joining the ship for the only time ever. This included taking part in FLEETEX 83-1 which was also the largest ASW exercise up to that time since World War II. In November, the squadron was informed they would moving to Japan to join CVW-5 as the first ASW unit to be assigned to the Coral Sea's sister USS Midway (CV-41). On 15 July 1984 (seven years since being established) they officially joined CVW-5. The first deployment on Midway would later come in late 1984. While Midway underwent modifications in 1986, HS-12 sent three detachments to the USS Oldendorf (DD-972).

=== 1991 Gulf War ===
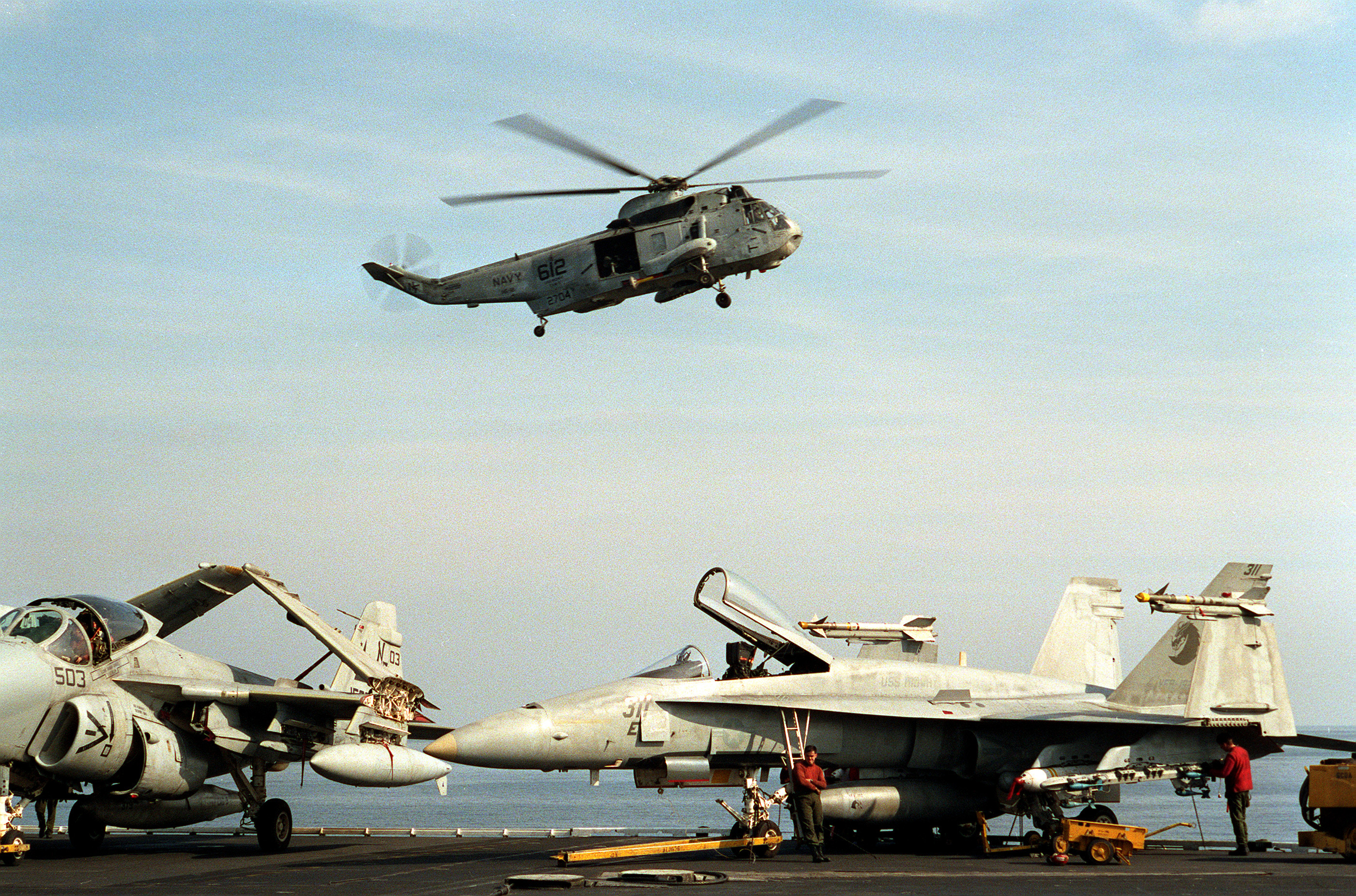
An SH-3H of HS-12 in January 1991 above the USS Midway. Below it to the left is an A-6E TRAM Intruder of VA-115 Eagles and an F/A-18A Hornet of VFA-192 Golden Dragons.

With the Invasion of Kuwait by Iraq on 2 August 1990, the USS Midway and CVW-5 deployed to the Persian Gulf to relieve the USS Independence (CV-62) and CVW-14 which had already arrived in the Gulf. Before the deployment, the Midway and CVW-5 were conducting exercises with the JMSDF which included the tracking of a then-Soviet Navy Foxtrot Class Submarine for 4.9 hours while it transited the Tsushima Straits. The deployment officially began on 2 October and almost a month later, the ship reached the Strait of Hormuz as part of Operation Desert Shield. It was during the time in the Persian Gulf that HS-12 conducted exercises which included four of the six helicopters had their ASW equipment removed and replaced by guns.

With the Beginning of Operation Desert Storm on 17 January 1991, the squadron started conducted operations in support which began with the capture of Jazirat Qaruh on 24 January. This involved the insertion of sixteen Navy SEALs by HS-12 on to the former Kuwaiti Island. During the first liberation of Kuwaiti land, 3 Iraqis were killed and 29 Iraqis were captured. This was followed by a few more raids including one on the day before the ceasefire on 27 February 1991. With the liberation of Kuwait finally at hand, HS-12 finally returned to NAF Atsugi on 17 April 1991.

=== Final years (1991–1994) ===
After taking part in the Operation Fiery Vigil after the 1991 eruption of Mount Pinatubo in the Philippines, HS-12 made their last deployment on the Midway when the carrier sailed from Yokosuka to Pearl Harbor to swap with the Independence and CVW-14. During this, CVW-5 moved to the Independence while CVW-14 went back to the U.S. with the Midway, while some squadrons swapped aircraft. After completing their last deployment on 29 August 1994 while on board the Independence as part of CVW-5, the squadron decommissioned three months later on 30 November 1994, ending seventeen years of service, the squadron being replaced by HS-14 Chargers, equipped with the SH-60F Oceanhawk and HH-60H Rescuehawk.
