= ANNUALEX =

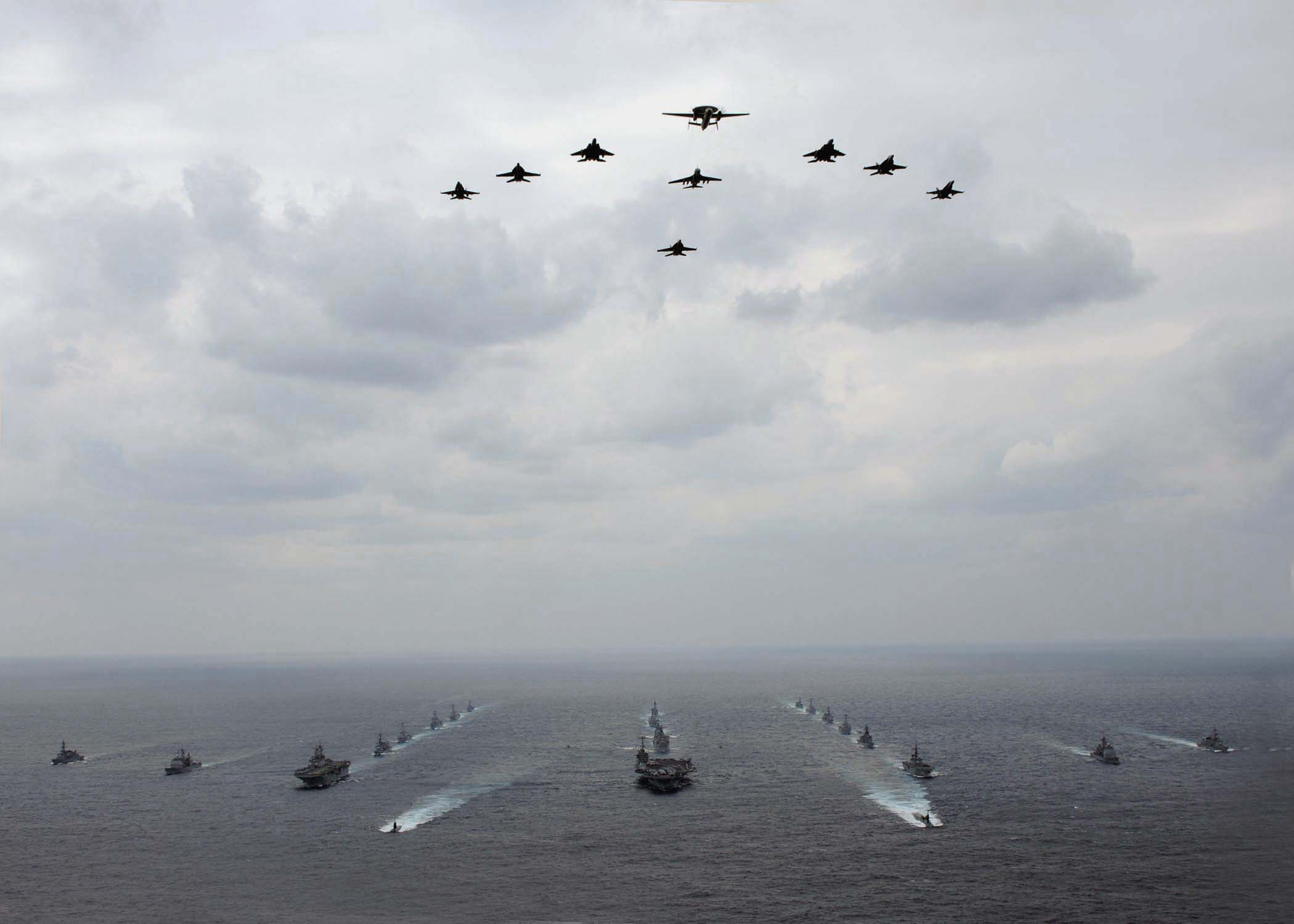
USN-JASDF ships and aircraft formations during ANNUALEX 2008

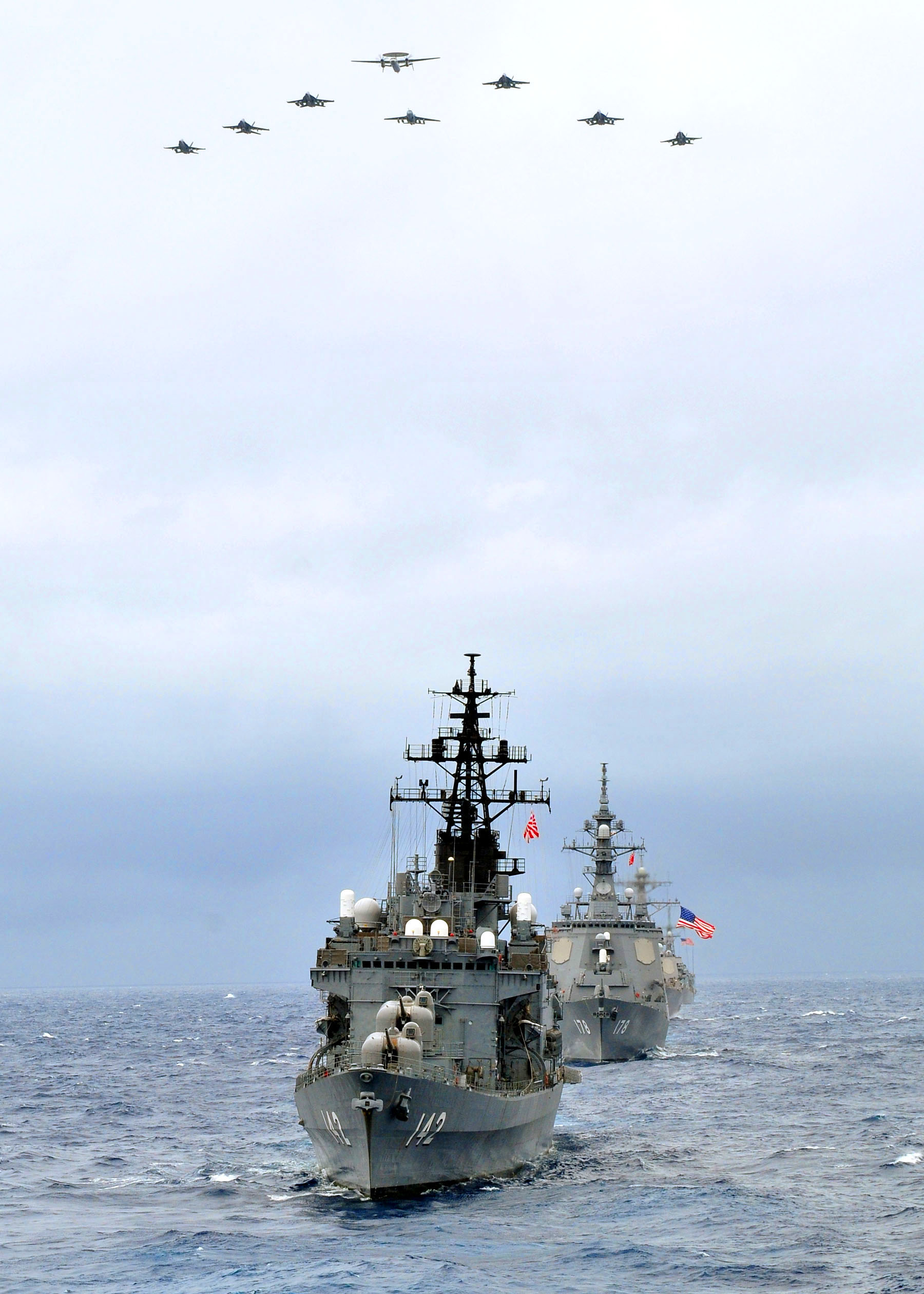
Aircraft fly overhead during an ANNUALEX 21G formation in 2009.

ANNUALEX or AnnualEx (AE) is a military exercise by the United States Navy and the Japan Maritime Self-Defense Force. It is annually held in the Southern Sea of Japan.

The official definition reads: [ANNUALEX] ...

... is a bilateral training exercise between the Navy and JMSDF conducted in the waters south of Japan, to practice and evaluate the coordination, procedures, and interoperability elements required to effectively and cohesively respond to the defense of Japan or to a regional contingency in the Indo-Asia-Pacific.

— United States Navy, Mass Communication Specialist Seaman Sara B. Sexton, Commander, Task Force 70 Public Affairs, Japanese Admiral Embarks Ronald Reagan as Sea Combatant Commander During AnnualEx 16

== History ==
The first ANNUALEX was held between November 5 and 15, 1996. ANNUALEX 13g was held from November 4–11, 2016, and participation included 750 American military personnel.

ANNUALEX 2021 was held from November 21–30 in the Philippine Sea. Five international navies participated, including the Royal Australian Navy (RAN), Royal Canadian Navy (RCN), German Navy (GMN), Japan Maritime Self-Defense Force (JMSDF), and the U.S. Navy. The German Navy participated with the "Bayern", an anti-submarine specialized ship with on-board helicopters and sonar equipment.

The Carrier Strike Group 1 with the USS Carl Vinson (CVN 70) participated in the ANNAULEX held in November 2023. The RAN and RCN also participated together with Japan and the U.S.

ANNAULEX 2025 was held from October 20-31 in the Philippine Sea with the JS Kaga (DDH184) anti-submarine warfare destroyer in the lead. The U.S. Navy and Marine Corps participated in the 2025 ANNAULEX as well as the RAN and the Royal Australian Air Force (RAAF), the RCN and Royal Canadian Air Force (RCAF), the French Navy and the Royal New Zealand Air Force (RNZAF).
