= List of United States Navy aircraft squadrons =

This is a list of active United States Navy aircraft squadrons. Deactivated or disestablished squadrons are listed in the list of inactive United States Navy aircraft squadrons.

vThe U.S. Navy uses the term "squadron" only to describe units consisting of aircraft, ships, submarines or boats. It does not use it for maintenance, medical, administrative, support or other any other units as does the USAF, U.S. Army, and USMC. There are three exceptions: Tactical Air Control Squadrons (TACRON) operate Tactical Air Control Centers aboard amphibious ships and consist of personnel who control aircraft in amphibious operations; Tactical Operations Control Squadrons (TOCRON) operate Patrol and Reconnaissance Wing Tactical Operations Centers supporting Patrol (VP) squadron operations; and the operating units of Naval Special Warfare Development Group colloquially known as "SEAL Team Six" are called "squadrons" named by color (these squadrons are the organizational equivalent of a "regular" SEAL Team).

Selected aircraft squadrons and their histories are listed in the Dictionary of American Naval Aviation Squadrons (DANAS).

== Aircraft Squadron organization ==
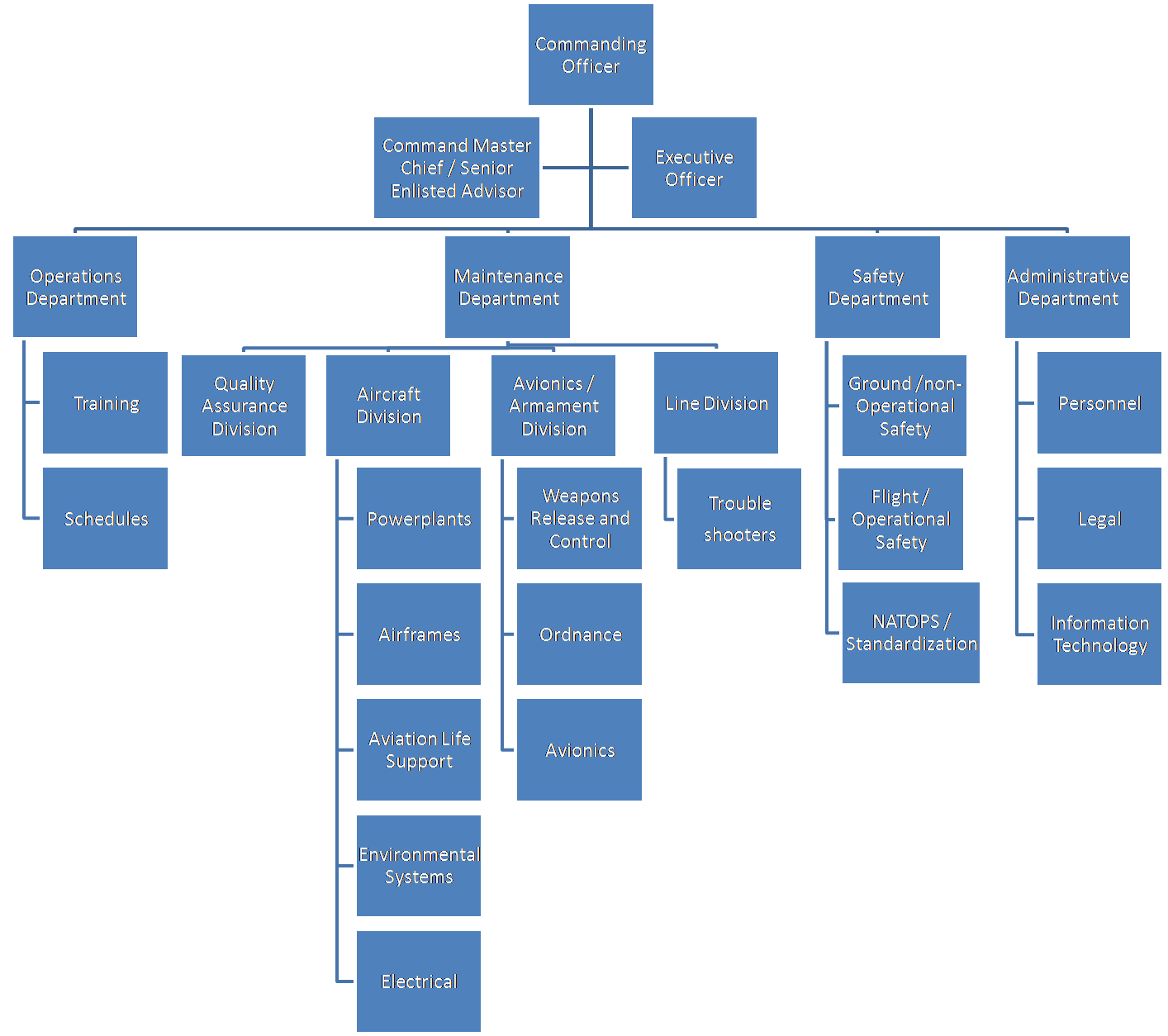
Navy squadron organization (a typical squadron)

Navy aircraft squadrons are composed of aircraft, (Note: in contrast to the USAF where custody of aircraft is usually held by the Wing's Maintenance Group, USN aircraft squadrons are the reporting custodians of their aircraft) the officers who fly the aircraft, the officers and sailors who crew or maintain them, and operational and administrative support sailors. Aircraft carrier based squadrons number between about 150 and 250 officers and sailors and have as few as five aircraft to as many as fourteen depending on the type of squadron. Aircraft squadrons are commanded by a Naval Aviator or Naval Flight Officer (NFO) Commanding Officer (CO) who holds the rank of Commander. (Note: Some large squadrons (test and evaluation squadrons or fleet replacement squadrons for example) might be commanded by a Captain) Second in command is the Executive Officer (XO), also a Naval Aviator or NFO who also holds the rank of Commander. The XO typically assumes command of the squadron after approximately 15 months as XO. In the case of Training Squadrons or Test and Evaluation Squadrons the CO or XO will often be a USMC Lieutenant Colonel (Note: or Colonel in the case of a large test and evaluation squadron) as those squadrons are composed of both Navy and Marine Corps personnel. (Note: Also, command of one training squadron is shared between the USN and the USCG) A Command Master Chief (CMC), a senior sailor who holds the rating of Command master chief petty officer acts as the senior enlisted advisor to the CO. There are typically four departments – Operations, Maintenance, Safety, and Administration – each led by a Lieutenant Commander Naval Aviator or NFO "Department Head". An assistant Maintenance Officer who is a senior Lieutenant or Lieutenant Commander Aerospace Maintenance Duty Officer or Limited Duty Officer assists the maintenance department head. Within the departments are divisions each headed by a Lieutenant or Lieutenant (junior grade) Naval Aviator or NFO "Division Officer". Divisions are divided into branches typically headed by a Chief Petty Officer but in very large squadrons they may be headed by a Lieutenant (junior grade) or recently promoted Lieutenant. All but four officers in an aircraft carrier based squadron are Naval Aviators or NFOs with those four typically being two Aerospace Maintenance Duty Officers or Limited Duty Officers, one Intelligence Officer, and one aircraft maintenance or ordnance Warrant Officer. If there is an Ensign to be found in an aircraft squadron he or she will likely be one of the non-Naval Aviators or NFOs as the length of Naval Aviator and NFO training pipelines often exceeds two years.

The CO of a Reserve squadron is also a Commander, as is the XO who will also assume command after approximately 15 months. However, reserve squadron demographics are typically older and more senior in rank than their active duty squadron counterparts. Department heads in reserve squadrons are typically senior Lieutenant Commanders or recently promoted Commanders. Where this difference in maturity level becomes more apparent is at the division officer level. Since most officers in reserve squadrons previously served on active duty in the Regular Navy in a flying status for eight to ten or more years, they are typically already Lieutenant Commanders or achieve that rank shortly after transferring to the Navy Reserve. As a result, Lieutenants are a minority and Lieutenants (junior grade) are practically non-existent in reserve squadrons; therefore, divisions are typically headed by Lieutenant Commanders and branches by Lieutenants, Senior Chief Petty Officers or Chief Petty Officers. U.S. Navy Reserve squadrons are manned by a combination of full-time and part-time reservists. The Navy Reserve provides 100% of the Navy's Adversary and land based Fleet Logistics Support capability.

== Aircraft Squadron designations ==
A single squadron can carry a number of designations through its existence. Chief Of Naval Operations Instruction 5030.4G governs the squadron designation system. A squadron comes into existence when it is "established". Upon establishment it receives a designation, for example Patrol Squadron One ("VP-1"). During the life of the squadron it may be "redesignated" one or more times, the Navy's oldest currently active squadron is VFA-14 which has been redesignated 15 times since it was established in 1919. Over the history of U.S. Naval Aviation there have been many designations which have been used multiple times (re-used) resulting in multiple unrelated squadrons bearing the same designation at different times. Once a squadron was either redesignated or "disestablished" its designation became available for a newly established squadron or a squadron redesignation. A squadron's lineage and history does not follow the designation, it follows the squadron regardless of the designation. A squadron which receives a designation of a previous squadron may adopt the insignia and or nickname of that former squadron, but that does not make it the same squadron and it cannot lay claim to the previous squadron's lineage or history any more than a new ship commissioned USS Enterprise could claim to be the actual WWII aircraft carrier USS Enterprise.

Navy and Marine Corps squadrons are designated using a series of letters followed by a hyphen and a series of numbers. In 1920 with issuance of General Order 541, two overall types of aircraft were identified and assigned permanent letters; lighter than air types were identified by the letter Z and heavier than air types by the letter V. The use of letter abbreviations for squadrons was promulgated in the "Naval Aeronautic Organization for Fiscal Year 1923" which is the first known record associating the abbreviated Aircraft Class Designations with abbreviated squadron designations. Squadrons which flew heavier than air aircraft were designated with the first letter V and squadrons which flew lighter than air aircraft (blimps) were designated with the first letter Z. A second letter followed indicating the purpose of the squadron (ex: P for Patrol, F for Fighting). (Note: After 1 July 1941 USMC squadrons were identified by the letter "M" in the second position with the purpose letter in a third position (ex: VMF-214 "Marine Fighter Squadron 214"). Prior to 1 July 1941 USMC squadrons had been identified by the letter "M" appended to the end of the designation (ex: VF-1M)) A VP squadron was a patrol squadron which flew patrol airplanes and a ZP squadron was a patrol squadron which flew patrol blimps. Squadrons were numbered either serially within each type (VP-1, VP-2 etc...) or they were numbered to conform with a higher level organization (VF-8 belonging to Carrier Air Group eight during WWII for example) depending on the designation scheme in use at that specific time in history. Squadron numbers today are a result of this mixed history resulting in seemingly non-sensical numbering.

In 1948 the Navy established its first two operational helicopter squadrons designating them Helicopter Utility Squadrons. Even though helicopters are heavier than air aircraft it did not use the letter "V" in the squadron designation but instead designated them "HU" ('Helicopter, Utility'). From that point on squadrons which flew rotary wing aircraft were designated with the first letter "H" leaving "V" to only fixed wing heavier than air squadrons. In 1961 the Navy retired its last lighter than air aircraft and the letter "Z" was no longer used in the designation system leaving "V" to denote fixed wing squadrons and "H" to denote rotary wing squadrons. In rare cases of squadrons which have been made up of both fixed and rotary wing aircraft the letter "V" has been used to designate the squadron.

In April 2018 a new squadron type designation was created apart from the existing "V" for fixed wing squadron and "H" for rotary wing squadron when Air Test and Evaluation Squadron Twenty Four was programmed for establishment to develop unmanned aerial systems (UAS) for the U.S. Navy and Marine Corps and it was designated UX-24 seeming to create a third squadron type designation of "U" for squadrons flying unmanned aerial systems. However six years prior, in 2012 the navy had established a squadron to train operators of rotary winged UASs designating it HUQ-1 (that squadron was disestablished two years later in 2014), then in 2016 it established an "unmanned patrol squadron" to fly the MQ-4 Triton designating it VUP for V-fixed wing, U-unmanned, P-patrol and on 1 October 2022 it established its first MQ-25 Stingray unmanned aerial refueling squadron designating it VUQ-10 all sticking with "V" for fixed wing and "H" for rotary wing regardless of the fact that the aircraft were unmanned aerial systems. UX-24 is the only Navy squadron designated by a first letter other than V or H.

== Current U.S. Navy aircraft squadrons ==
The tables below contain lists of currently active U.S. Navy aircraft squadrons along with squadron lineage for each squadron, homeport or basing location, and wing assignment for each. Squadron types which deploy as part of a carrier air wing (CVW) are assigned to two wings, operationally to a carrier air wing and administratively to a type wing. Non carrier air wing type squadrons are assigned to a single functional wing. Some special mission/support squadrons are assigned to organizations other than a wing.

=== Airborne Command & Control (VAW) squadrons ===
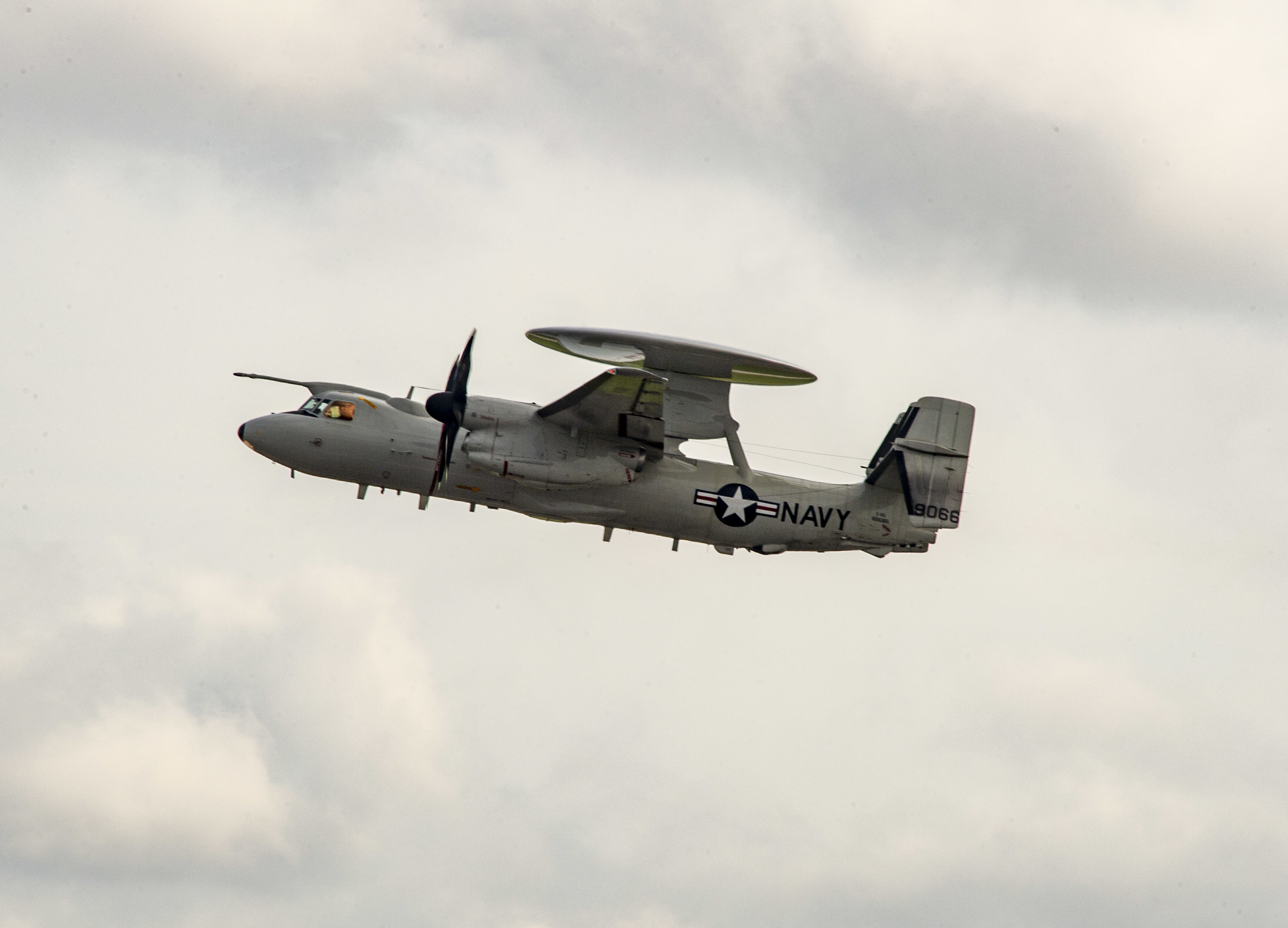
An E-2D Hawkeye

The VAW designation was first created in July 1948 with the establishment of VAW-1 and VAW-2 to designate "Carrier Airborne Early Warning Squadron". It was in use for less than two months as on 1 September 1948 VAW-1 and VAW-2 were redesignated "Composite Squadron" VC-11 and VC-12. In July 1956 the VAW designation was resurrected when VC-11 and VC-12 were redesignated VAW-11 and VAW-12. In 1967, VAW-11 and VAW-12 which were large land based squadrons that provided detachments of Airborne Early Warning aircraft to deploying carrier air wings were redesignated as wings and each of their detachments were established as separate squadrons. Established from VAW-11 were RVAW-110 which was a Fleet Replacement Squadron (FRS), VAW-111, 112, 113, 114, 115, 116 and established from VAW-12 were RVAW-120 (a FRS), VAW-121, 122, 123 (VAWs 110, 111, 112, 114 and 122 have since been disestablished or deactivated). In 2019, the VAW designation was renamed from Carrier Airborne Early Warning Squadron to Airborne Command and Control squadron and all VAW squadrons were renamed "Airborne Command & Control Squadron____" retaining the VAW designation.

Each Airborne Command and Control squadron consists of five E-2D Hawkeyes except for the Fleet Replacement Squadron which has more. Transition to the E-2D Hawkeye from the E-2C began in 2010 and completed in 2026 with the transition of VAW-116 which was the last squadron to operate the E-2C. The Hawkeye's primary mission is to provide all-weather airborne early warning, airborne battle management and command and control (C2) functions for the carrier strike group and Joint Force Commander. Additional missions include surface surveillance coordination, air interdiction, offensive and defensive counter air control, close air support coordination, time critical strike coordination, search and rescue airborne coordination and communications relay.

All deployable VAW squadrons are operationally assigned to a carrier air wing and administratively to Airborne Command & Control and Logistics Wing which is a Type Wing. The Fleet Replacement Squadron reports operationally and administratively to the Type Wing.

The single Fleet Replacement Squadron which serves both the Atlantic and Pacific Fleets is based at Naval Station Norfolk, VA. Deployable squadrons when not deployed are home-ported at either Naval Station Norfolk, VA or Naval Base Ventura County, Point Mugu, CA. The exception is VAW-125, which is forward deployed to Marine Corps Air Station Iwakuni, Japan with Carrier Air Wing Five.

Disestablished and deactivated VAW squadrons can be found here: Disestablished or deactivated VAW squadrons

Squadron designation	Insignia	Nickname	Aircraft	Carrier air wing	Type Wing	Squadron lineage	Station	Notes	Tail code
VAW-113		Black Eagles	E-2D	CVW-2	ACCLOGWING (Note: Airborne Command & Control and Logistics Wing)	VAW-113: 20 Apr 1967–present	NBVC Pt. Mugu	(Note: was established from a detachment of VAW-11)	*
VAW-115		Liberty Bells	E-2D	CVW-11	ACCLOGWING	VAW-115: 20 Apr 1967–present	NBVC Pt. Mugu		*
VAW-116		Sun Kings	E-2D	CVW-7	ACCLOGWING	VAW-116: 20 Apr 1967–present	NBVC Pt. Mugu		*
VAW-117		Wallbangers	E-2D	CVW-9	ACCLOGWING	VAW-117: 1 Jul 1974–present	NBVC Pt. Mugu		*
VAW-120		Grey Hawks	E-2D		ACCLOGWING	RVAW-120: 1 Jul 1967 – 1 May 1983; VAW-120: 1 May 1983 – present	NS Norfolk	FRS (Note: was established from VAW-12 when VAW-12 was elevated to a wing)	AD (Note: Fleet Replacement Squadrons for fixed wing carrier type aircraft carry tail code AD (Atlantic Fleet) or NJ (Pacific Fleet) which were the tail codes of Readiness Carrier Air Wing FOUR (AD) and TWELVE (NJ) which were disestablished in 1970)
VAW-121		Blue Tails	E-2D	CVW-17	ACCLOGWING	VAW-121: 1 Apr 1967–present	NS Norfolk	(Note: was established from a detachment of VAW-12)	*
VAW-123		Screwtops	E-2D	CVW-3	ACCLOGWING	VAW-123: 1 Apr 1967–present	NS Norfolk		*
VAW-124		Bear Aces	E-2D	CVW-8	ACCLOGWING	VAW-124: 1 Sep 1967–present	NS Norfolk		*
VAW-125		Tigertails	E-2D	CVW-5	ACCLOGWING	VAW-125: 1 Oct 1968–present	MCAS Iwakuni		*
VAW-126		Seahawks	E-2D	CVW-1	ACCLOGWING	VAW-126: 1 Apr 1969–present	NS Norfolk		*

- Carrier air wing (CVW) squadrons are marked with the tail code of their assigned CVW.
  Naval Air Force Atlantic Fleet CVW tail codes begin with the letter "A": CVW-1 AB, CVW-3 AC, CVW-7 AG, CVW-8 AJ
  Naval Air Force Pacific Fleet CVW tail codes begin with the letter "N": CVW-2 NE, CVW-5 NF, CVW-9 NG, CVW-11 NH, CVW-17 NA

=== Air Test and Evaluation (VX), (HX), (UX) squadrons ===
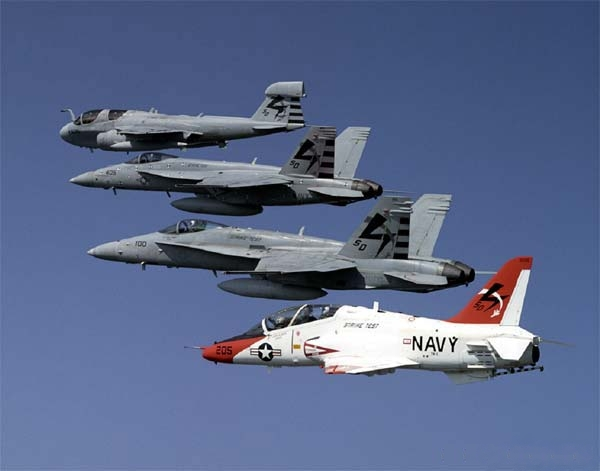
VX-23 jets in 2006

The VX designation was first used from 1927 to 1943 to designate "experimental squadron". It was again used beginning in 1946 when four "experimental and development" squadrons (VX-1 (still exists today), 2, 3 and 4) (Note: VX-1: anti-submarine aircraft and technologies, VX-2: pilotless aircraft and guided missiles, VX-3: helicopters, and VX-4: airborne early warning aircraft and technologies) were established to develop and evaluate new equipment and methods. From 1946 to 1968 the designation was variously "Experimental and Development" squadron, "Operational Development" squadron, "Air Operational Development" squadron and "Air Development" squadron. In 1969 the designation changed to "Air Test and Evaluation" squadron and it remains as such today.

In 2002 the Naval Air Systems Command's five aircraft and weapons test squadrons which conducted developmental test and evaluation of aircraft and weapons systems were all redesignated Air Test and Evaluation Squadrons using the same designation as the then existing two Navy and one USMC operational test and evaluation squadrons except that the rotary wing squadron was designated with the first letter 'H' rather than 'V'. When a specialized unmanned aerial vehicle test and evaluation squadron was established in 2018 it was designated with the first letter 'U' in place of the standard fixed wing 'V'.

Air test and evaluation squadrons test everything from basic aircraft flying qualities to advanced aerodynamics to weapons systems effectiveness and employment. VX-20, HX-21, VX-23, UX-24, VX-30 and VX-31 are developmental test and evaluation squadrons which conduct or support developmental test and evaluation of aircraft and weapons as part of the Naval Air Systems Command (NAVAIRSYSCOM) while VX-1 and VX-9 are operational test and evaluation squadrons which along with USMC squadrons HMX-1 and VMX-1 conduct operational test and evaluation of aircraft and weapons as part of the Operational Test and Evaluation Force (OPTEVFOR).

Disestablished and deactivated VX squadrons can be found here: Disestablished or deactivated VX squadrons

Squadron designation	Insignia	Nickname	Aircraft	Functional Wing	Squadron lineage	Station	Notes	Tail Code
VX-1		Pioneers	MH-60R, MH-60S, P-8A, KC-130J, E-2D, MQ-4C, MQ-8C	VX-1 and VX-9 are not assigned to a wing, they are elements of the Aviation Warfare Division of Commander, Operational Test and Evaluation Force	Acft ASW Dev Det Atlantic Flt: 1 Apr 1943 – 17 Sep 1943; ASW Dev Det Atlantic Flt: 17 Sep 1943–15 Mar 1946; VX-1: 15 Mar 1946–present	NAS Patuxent River	(Note: Operational test and evaluation of ASW and other maritime aircraft and weapons.)	JA
VX-9		Vampires	FA-18E, FA-18F, F-35C, EA-18G	VX-1 and VX-9 are not assigned to a wing, they are elements of the Aviation Warfare Division of Commander, Operational Test and Evaluation Force	VX-9: 30 Apr 1994–present	NAWS China Lake (Note: with a detachment at Edwards AFB for F-35C testing)	(Note: Operational test and evaluation of strike aircraft and weapons.) (Note: Established from the personnel and assets of VX-4(2nd) "Evaluators" and VX-5 "Vampires" which were then both disestablished on 30 September 1994.)	XE
VX-20		Force	E-2D, E-6B, E-130J, KC-130T, C-130J, KC-130J, C-38A, P-8A	Naval Test Wing; Atlantic	Naval Force Acft Test Sqdn: 21 Jul 1955 – 1 May 2002; VX-20: 1 May 2002 – present	NAS Patuxent River	(Note: Developmental test and evaluation of ASW and other maritime aircraft.)	FORCE
HX-21		Blackjack	AH-1Z, UH-1Y, MH-60R, MH-60S, CH-53E, CH-53K, CMV-22B, TH-57C, MQ-8C	Naval Test Wing; Atlantic	Naval Rotary Wing Acft Test Sqdn: 21 Jul 1995 – 1 May 2002; HX-21: 1 May 2002 – present	NAS Patuxent River	(Note: Developmental test and evaluation of Rotary Wing and Tilt Rotor Aircraft.)	HX
VX-23		Salty Dogs	F/A-18A/B/C/D/E/F, F-35B/C, EA-18G, T-45	Naval Test Wing; Atlantic	Naval Strike Acft Test Sqdn: 21 Jul 1995 – 1 May 2002; VX-23: 1 May 2002 – present	NAS Patuxent River	(Note: Developmental test and evaluation of Strike Aircraft.)	SD
UX-24		Ghost Wolves	MQ-8, MQ-9, RQ-20, MQ-25, RQ-26	Naval Test Wing; Atlantic	UX-24: 18 Oct 2018 – present	NAS Patuxent River	(Note: Developmental test and evaluation of unmanned aircraft.)	(Note: this squadron has no assigned tail code)
VX-30		Bloodhounds	P-3C, NP-3C, NP-3D, NC-20G, NC-37B; E-2D, KC-130T, UAVs	Naval Test Wing; Pacific	Naval Weapons Test Sqdn, Pt Mugu: 8 May 1995 – 1 May 2002; VX-30: 1 May 2002 – present	NBVC Pt. Mugu	(Note: Range surveillance, photometric support, area clearance, and airborne telemetry on the Naval Air Systems Command Sea Test Range in support of developmental test and evaluation of airborne weapons and platform-related systems.)	BH
VX-31		Dust Devils	F/A-18C/D/E/F, EA-18G, MH-60S	Naval Test Wing; Pacific	Naval Weapons Test Sqdn, China Lake: 8 May 1995 – 1 May 2002; VX-31: 1 May 2002 – present	NAWS China Lake	(Note: Developmental test and evaluation of airborne weapons and platform-related systems.)	DD

=== Electronic Attack (VAQ) squadrons ===
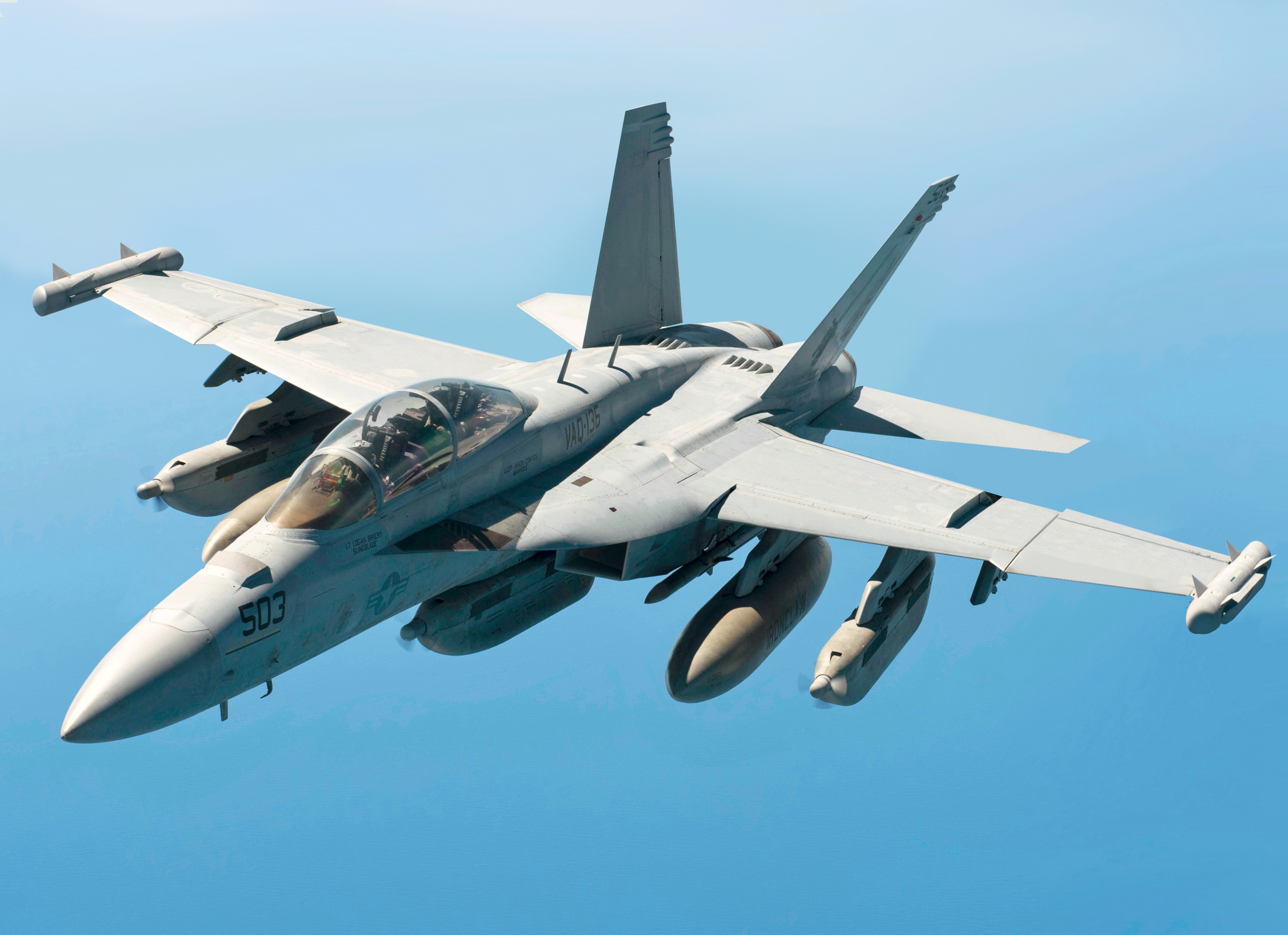
An EA-18G Growler

The VAQ (V-fixed wing, A-attack, Q-electronic countermeasure) designation was established in 1968 to designate "Tactical Electronic Warfare Squadron". On 30 March 1998 the name of the designation was changed to "Electronic Attack Squadron" and all VAQ squadrons then in existence were renamed from "Tactical Electronic Warfare Squadron ___" to "Electronic Attack Squadron ___".

Carrier air wing Electronic Attack Squadrons consist of seven Boeing EA-18G Growlers while land based "expeditionary" squadrons are made up of only five. The primary mission of the Growler is Suppression of Enemy Air Defenses (SEAD) in support of strike aircraft and ground troops by interrupting enemy electronic activity and obtaining tactical electronic intelligence within the combat area.

Most VAQ squadrons are operationally assigned to a carrier air wing and administratively to Electronic Attack Wing, Pacific Fleet which is a type wing. However, six are land based squadrons (including the one USNR squadron) which do not deploy as part of a carrier air wing but instead deploy independently to land bases. These non-carrier air wing squadrons are called "expeditionary" squadrons and were formed as a result of the USAF's decision to retire its fleet of EF-111A Raven aircraft without replacement in the 1990s. The Navy was tasked to replace that lost capability with support from the USAF and as such the five active component expeditionary squadrons are each augmented by one or two USAF pilots or Combat Systems Officers (CSOs) of the 390th Electronic Combat Squadron (390th ECS). The Fleet Replacement Squadron (FRS) is also augmented by 390th ECS CSOs serving as instructors. The expeditionary squadrons are assigned both operationally and administratively to Electronic Attack Wing, Pacific Fleet except for VAQ-209 which is administratively assigned to the USNR's Tactical Support Wing.

The single Fleet Replacement Squadron is based at Naval Air Station Whidbey Island, WA. Deployable squadrons when not deployed are all home-ported at Naval Air Station Whidbey Island, WA. The exception is VAQ-141, which is forward deployed to MCAS Iwakuni, Japan with Carrier Air Wing Five.

Disestablished and deactivated VAQ squadrons can be found here: Disestablished or deactivated VAQ squadrons

Note: The parenthetical (Second use) and (2nd) appended to some designations in the table below are not a part of the squadron designation system. They are added to indicate that the designation was used more than once during the history of U.S. Naval Aviation to designate a squadron and that these were the second use of that designation.

Squadron designation	Insignia	Nickname	Aircraft	Carrier Air Wing	Type Wing	Squadron lineage (Note: Former squadron designations below: VAW Carrier Airborne Early Warning, VAH Heavy Attack (nuclear bomber), VP Patrol, VP-ML Patrol (Medium Landplane))	Station	Notes	Tail Code
VAQ-129		Vikings	EA-18G		VAQWINGPAC (Note: Electronic Attack Wing Pacific)	VAH-10: 1 May 1961 – 1 Sep 1970; VAQ-129: 1 Sep 1970–present	NAS Whidbey Island	FRS	NJ
VAQ-130		Zappers	EA-18G	CVW-3	VAQWINGPAC	VAW-13: 1 Sep 1959 – 1 Oct 1968; VAQ-130: 1 Oct 1968–present	NAS Whidbey Island		*
VAQ-131		Lancers	EA-18G		VAQWINGPAC	VP-920: 1 May 1946 – 15 Nov 1946; VP-ML-70: 15 Nov 1946 – Feb 1950; VP-931: Feb 1950 – 4 Feb 1953; VP-57: 4 Feb 1953 – 3 Jul 1956; VAH-4: 3 Jul 1956 – 1 Nov 1968; VAQ-131: 1 Nov 1968–present	NAS Whidbey Island	Expeditionary Squadron. (Note: USNR squadron VP-931 was activated on 2 Sep 1950 for participation in the Korean War)	NL (Note: Expeditionary squadrons use tail code NL because when CVW-15 to which that tail code was assigned was disestablished in 1995 its VAQ squadron which was VAQ-134 was re-purposed as the first expeditionary squadron. It kept its CVW-15 NL tail code and all expeditionary squadrons have since been assigned that tail code.)
VAQ-132		Scorpions	EA-18G		VAQWINGPAC	VAH-2: 1 Nov 1955 – 1 Nov 1968; VAQ-132: 1 Nov 1968–present	NAS Whidbey Island	Expeditionary Squadron	NL
VAQ-133 (Second use)		Wizards	EA-18G	CVW-9	VAQWINGPAC	VAQ-133(2nd): 1 Apr 1996–present	NAS Whidbey Island	(Note: There was an earlier squadron designated VAQ-133 also called the "Wizards" which existed from 4 Mar 1969 to Jun 1992)	*
VAQ-134		Garudas	EA-18G		VAQWINGPAC	VAQ-134: 17 Jun 1969–present	NAS Whidbey Island	Expeditionary Squadron	NL
VAQ-135		Black Ravens	EA-18G		VAQWINGPAC	VAQ-135: 15 May 1969 – present	NAS Whidbey Island	Expeditionary Squadron	NL
VAQ-136		Gauntlets	EA-18G	CVW-2	VAQWINGPAC	VAQ-136: 6 Apr 1973–present	NAS Whidbey Island		*
VAQ-137 (Second use)		Rooks	EA-18G	CVW-11	VAQWINGPAC	VAQ-137(2nd): 1 Oct 1996–present	NAS Whidbey Island	(Note: There was an earlier squadron designated VAQ-137 also called the "Rooks" which existed from 14 Dec 1973 to 26 May 1994)	*
VAQ-138		Yellowjackets	EA-18G		VAQWINGPAC	VAQ-138: 27 Feb 1976–present	NAS Whidbey Island	Expeditionary Squadron	NL
VAQ-139		Cougars	EA-18G	CVW-17	VAQWINGPAC	VAQ-139: 1 Jul 1983–present	NAS Whidbey Island		*
VAQ-140		Patriots	EA-18G	CVW-7	VAQWINGPAC	VAQ-140: 1 Oct 1985–present	NAS Whidbey Island		*
VAQ-141		Shadowhawks	EA-18G	CVW-5	VAQWINGPAC	VAQ-141: 1 Jul 1987–present	MCAS Iwakuni		*
VAQ-142 (Second use)		Gray Wolves	EA-18G	CVW-8	VAQWINGPAC	VAQ-142(2nd): 1 Apr 1997–present	NAS Whidbey Island	(Note: There was an earlier squadron designated VAQ-142 called the "Grim Watchdogs" which existed from 1 Jun 1988 to March 1991)	*
VAQ-144		Main Battery	EA-18G	CVW-1	VAQWINGPAC	VAQ-144: 1 Oct 2021–present	NAS Whidbey Island	(Note: Adopted "Main Battery" name from former VA-196 which was the last Pacific Fleet A-6E squadron disestablished in 1997)	*
VAQ-209		Star Warriors	EA-18G		Tactical Support Wing	VAQ-209: 1 Oct 1977–present	NAS Whidbey Island	U.S. Navy Reserve	AF (Note: VAQ-209 is assigned to the USNR Tactical Support Wing and uses that wing's tail code AF from its prior existence as Carrier Air Wing Reserve Twenty)

*Carrier Air Wing (CVW) squadrons are marked with the tail code of their assigned CVW.
Naval Air Force Atlantic Fleet CVW tail codes begin with the letter "A": CVW-1 AB, CVW-3 AC, CVW-7 AG, CVW-8 AJ
Naval Air Force Pacific Fleet CVW tail codes begin with the letter "N": CVW-2 NE, CVW-5 NF, CVW-9 NG, CVW-11 NH, CVW-17 NA

=== Fighter Squadron Composite (VFC) squadrons (aggressor squadrons) ===
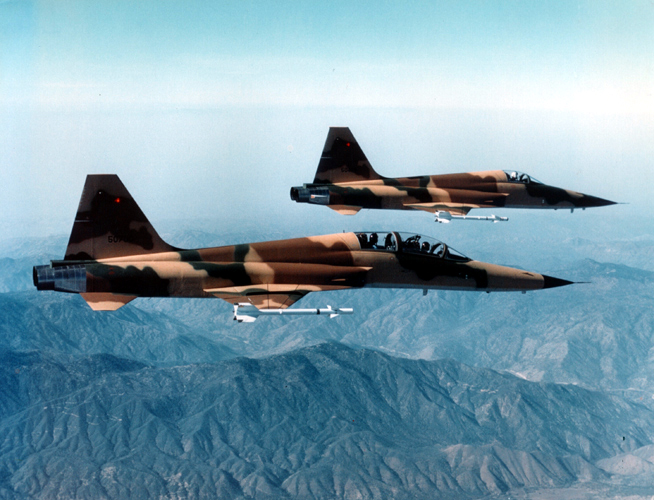
F-5s

VFC squadrons are aggressor squadrons. The VFC designation was created in 1988 when two Fleet Composite (VC) squadrons (VC-12 & 13) which were dedicated adversary squadrons were redesignated to differentiate them from the remaining VC squadrons which fulfilled various miscellaneous or utility roles. In 2006 a third VFC squadron (VFC-111) was established from what had become a permanent detachment of VFC-13 and in 2022 a fourth VFC squadron was created when the last remaining USNR VFA squadron (VFA-204) was redesignated to VFC. VFC squadrons provide adversary simulation for fleet squadrons. All VFC squadrons are Navy Reserve squadrons.

VFC-12 is based at NAS Oceana to support Strike Fighter Wing Atlantic squadron training, VFC-13 is based at NAS Fallon supporting Strike Fighter Wing Pacific and Joint Strike Fighter Wing squadrons homeported at nearby NAS Lemoore and supporting fleet training at the extensive range complex at NAS Fallon. (Note: Aggressor services for the Navy Fighter Weapons School (TOPGUN) at NAS Fallon are provided by the school's F/A-18E and F and F-16A and B aircraft flown by TOPGUN aggressor pilots not by the VFC squadrons) VFC-111 supports fleet squadron training at the ranges supported by NAS Key West and VFC-204 remains based at NAS JRB New Orleans where it was based in its former existence as a VFA squadron.

Note: The parenthetical (2nd) and (3rd) appended to some designations in the lineage column of table below are not a part of the squadron designation system. They are added to indicate that the designation was used more than once during the history of U.S. Naval Aviation and which use of the designation is indicated. Absence indicates that the designation was used only once.

Squadron designation	Insignia	Nickname	Aircraft	Functional Wing	Squadron lineage	Station	Notes	Tail Code
VFC-12		Fighting Omars	F/A-18E; F/A-18F	Tactical Support Wing	VC-12(3nd): 1 Sep 1973 – 22 Apr 1988; VFC-12: 22 Apr 1988–present	NAS Oceana	U.S. Navy Reserve	AF (Note: Tactical Support Wing uses tail code AF from its prior existence as Carrier Air Wing Reserve Twenty)
VFC-13		Saints	F-16C	Tactical Support Wing	VC-13(2nd): 1 Sep 1973 – 22 Apr 1988; VFC-13: 22 Apr 1988–present	NAS Fallon	U.S. Navy Reserve	AF
VFC-111		Sundowners (Note: Third "Sundowners" squadron. Adopted nickname and insignia of VF-111(3rd) which had been disestablished in 1995)	F-5F; F-5N	Tactical Support Wing	VFC-111: 1 Nov 2006–present	NAS Key West	U.S. Navy Reserve	AF
VFC-204		River Rattlers	F-5F; F-5N	Tactical Support Wing	VA-204: 1 Jul 1970 – 1 May 1991; VFA-204: 1 May 1991 – Oct 2022; VFC-204: Oct 2022–present	NAS JRB New Orleans	U.S. Navy Reserve	AF

=== Fleet Air Reconnaissance (VQ) squadrons ===
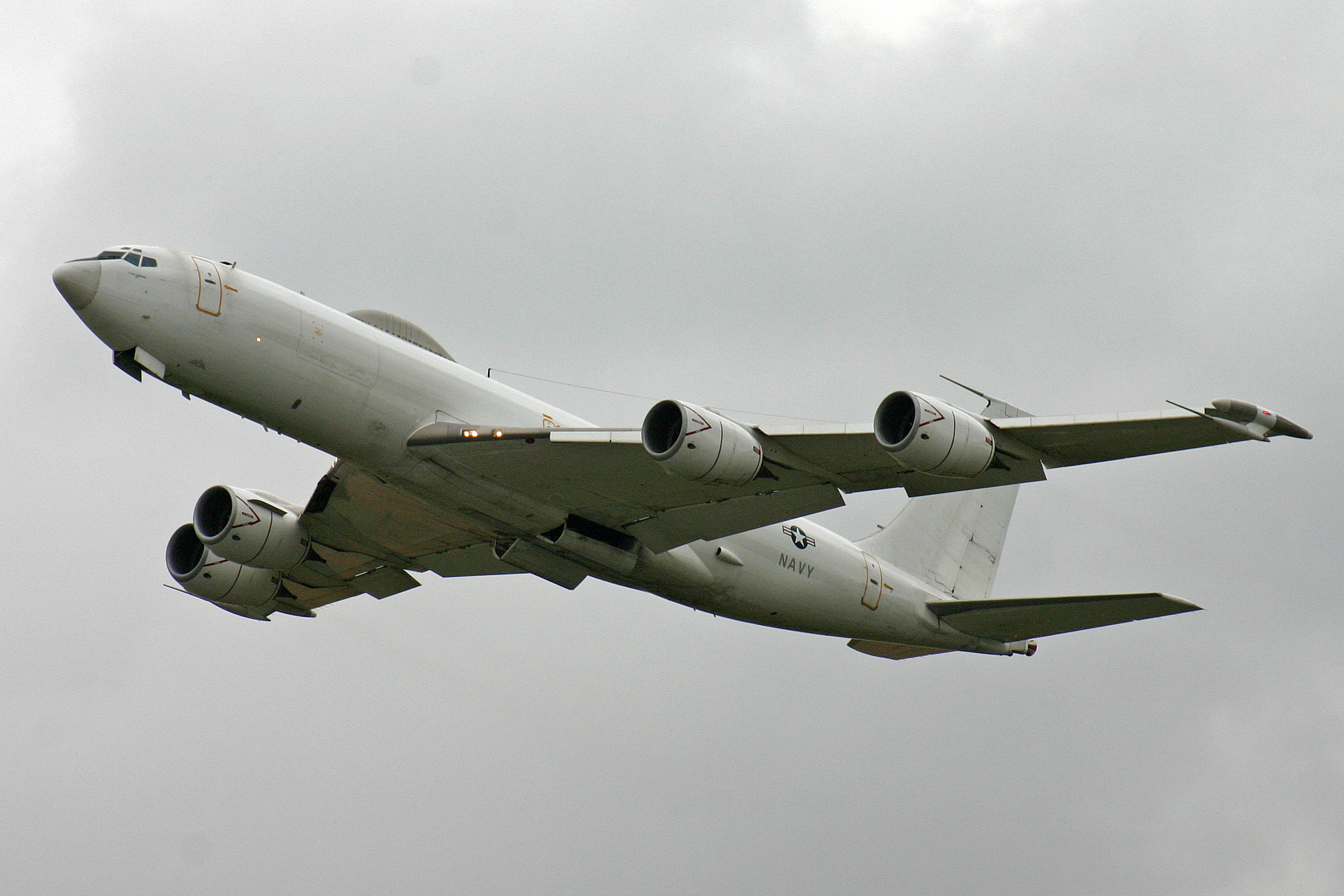
An E-6B Mercury

The VQ designation was created in 1955 to designate "Electronic Countermeasures Squadron" and did so though 1959. By 1960 the VQ squadrons, rather than simply jamming communications and electronic signals, had been equipped to collect them for intelligence purposes. In January 1960 this new role of the VQ squadrons was recognized by changing the VQ designation from "Electronic Countermeasures Squadron" to "Fleet Air Reconnaissance Squadron." Fleet Air Reconnaissance Squadron ONE which was deactivated on 31 March 2025 was the last VQ squadron to perform the Fleet Air Reconnaissance mission. Fleet Air Reconnaissance is now the mission of Unmanned Patrol (VUP) squadrons operating the MQ-4C Triton. Disestablished and deactivated Fleet Air Reconnaissance squadrons can be found here: Disestablished or deactivated VQ squadrons

Fleet Air Reconnaissance Squadrons THREE and FOUR carry the VQ designation, but they are not reconnaissance squadrons; they are airborne command and control, and communications relay squadrons which provide survivable, reliable, and endurable airborne command, control, and communications for the command and control of U.S. strategic nuclear forces. There are fifteen E-6B aircraft operated by two operational squadrons and one Fleet Replacement Squadron. These aircraft are dual-mission, fulfilling both the airborne strategic command post mission which was formerly carried out by the USAF until it retired its "Looking Glass" aircraft in 1998 without replacement, and the Navy TACAMO ("Take Charge and Move Out") mission which provides communications with submerged Navy ballistic missile submarines. The aircraft carry the Airborne Launch Control System (ALCS) which is capable of launching U.S. land based intercontinental ballistic missiles and are equipped with a very low frequency communication system with dual trailing wire antennae for the TACAMO mission. Strategic Communications Wing ONE reports administratively to Commander, Naval Air Force Pacific and operationally to the Commander of United States Strategic Command as the commander of United States Strategic Command Task Force 124. Fleet Air Reconnaissance Squadron SEVEN is the E-6B Fleet Replacement Squadron providing initial and requalification training for pilots, crew, and maintainers.

The Navy plans to replace the E-6B with a C-130 variant designated E-130J with a projected Initial Operational Capability in 2034. The E-130J will be a single mission aircraft assuming the TACAMO role but it will not carry the ALCS or be equipped for the airborne strategic command post mission which the USAF will re-assume, presumably with an E-4 variant.

Squadron designation	Insignia	Nickname	Aircraft	Functional Wing	Squadron lineage	Station	Notes	Tail Code
VQ-3		Ironman	E-6B	STRATCOMWING ONE (Note: Strategic Communications Wing ONE)	VQ-3: 1 Jul 1968–present	Tinker AFB	Dets at Travis AFB and Offutt AFB	(Note: Tail codes are not displayed on E-6B aircraft. However prior to the E-6B, VQ-3 and VQ-4 operated a C-130 variant (EC-130Q) and tail codes were displayed. VQ-3: TC, VQ-4: HL)
VQ-4		Shadows	E-6B	STRATCOMWING ONE	VQ-4: 1 Jul 1968–present	Tinker AFB	Det at NAS Patuxent River	(Note: Tail codes are not displayed on E-6B aircraft. However prior to the E-6B, VQ-3 and VQ-4 operated a C-130 variant (EC-130Q) and tail codes were displayed. VQ-3: TC, VQ-4: HL)
VQ-7		Roughnecks	E-6B	STRATCOMWING ONE	Naval Training Support Unit: 1992-1 Nov 1999; VQ-7: 1 Nov 1999–present	Tinker AFB	FRS	(Note: Tail codes are not displayed on E-6B aircraft. However prior to the E-6B, VQ-3 and VQ-4 operated a C-130 variant (EC-130Q) and tail codes were displayed. VQ-3: TC, VQ-4: HL)

=== Fleet Logistics Multi-Mission (VRM) squadrons ===
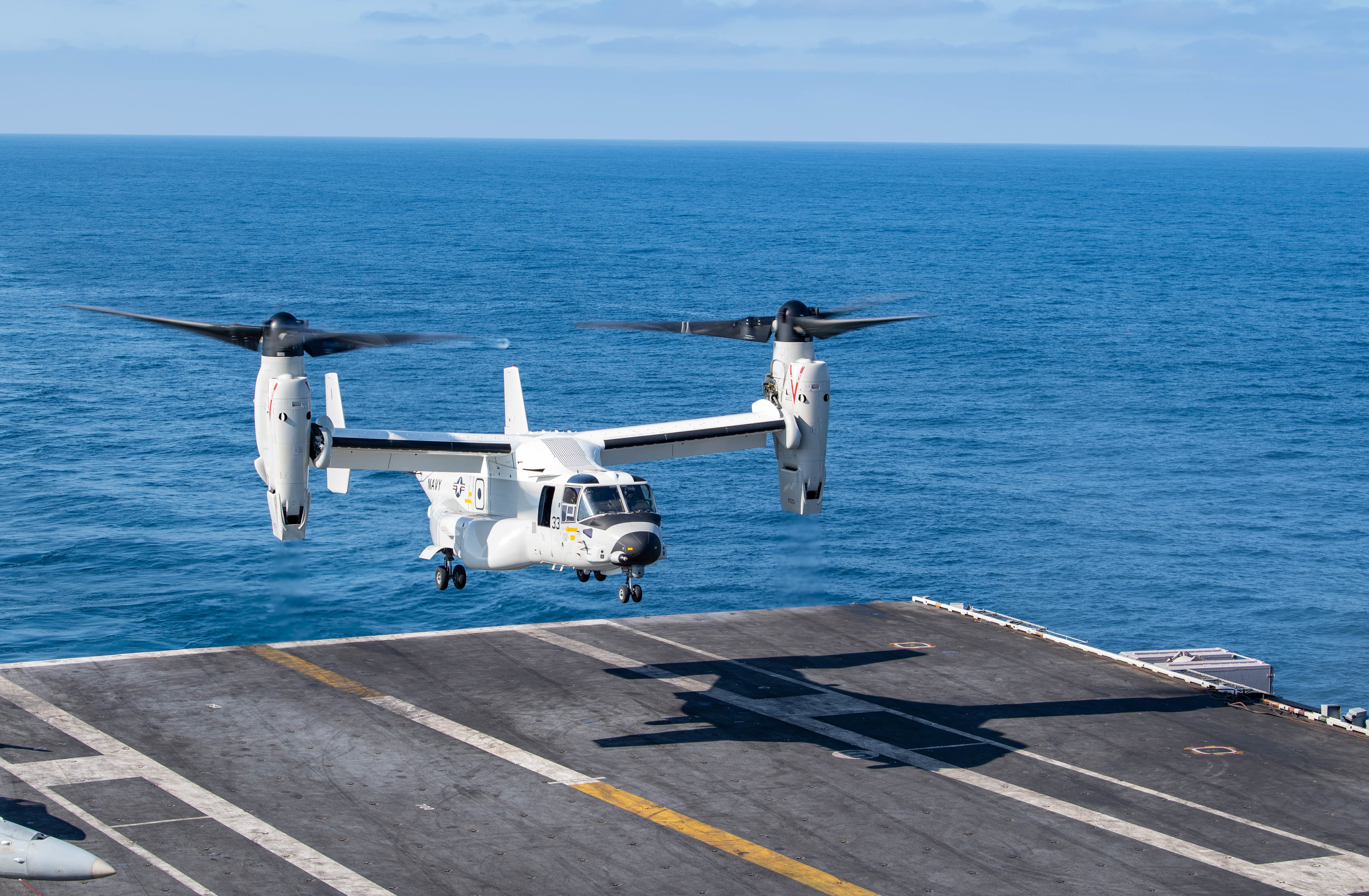
A CMV-22B Osprey

The VRM designation was first used in 2018 to designate a new Carrier Onboard Delivery (COD) squadron which was established to operate the CMV-22B Osprey tilt rotor aircraft as a replacement for the long serving C-2A Greyhound flown by Fleet Logistics Support (VRC) squadrons nearing the end of its service life. The inclusion of "Multi-Mission" in the squadron designation recognizes the versatility of the tilt rotor and hints at possible future roles if the Navy decides to invest in aircraft modifications and additional crew training and certification and is willing and able to acquire additional aircraft to meet an increased demand. Potential future additional roles could be transportation of special warfare teams or shore or sea-based combat search-and-rescue (CSAR)". The primary and currently only role however is logistics support of aircraft carriers and potentially of large deck amphibious warfare ships through the delivery of high priority parts, supplies, people, and mail to and from the carrier and logistics hubs in the carrier's operating area.

While the squadrons themselves are non-deploying shore based squadrons, the two operational squadrons provide detachments of three aircraft to deploy as part of a carrier air wing. The third squadron is a Fleet Replacement Squadron which trains pilots, aircrew and maintenance personnel to operate and maintain the CMV-22.

Squadron designation	Insignia	Nickname	Aircraft	Carrier Air Wing	Type Wing	Squadron lineage	Station	Notes	Tail Code
VRM-30		Titans	CMV-22B	PAC Fleet CVWs (Note: provides detachments to Pacific Fleet Carrier Air Wings)	VRMWING (Note: Fleet Logistics Multi-Mission Wing)	VRM-30: 1 Dec 2018 – present	NAS North Island	Det at MCAS Iwakuni	DC (Note: Tail codes are not usually displayed on CMV-22B aircraft. The last four digits of the aircraft's "Bureau Number" are usually displayed without a tail code on CMV-22B tails)
VRM-40		Mighty Bison	CMV-22B	LANT Fleet CVWs (Note: provides detachments to Atlantic Fleet Carrier Air Wings)	VRMWING	VRM-40: 14 Mar 2022 – present	NS Norfolk		JM
VRM-50		Sunhawks	CMV-22B		VRMWING	VRM-50: 1 Oct 2019 – present	NAS North Island	FRS	SB

=== Fleet Logistics Support (VR) squadrons ===
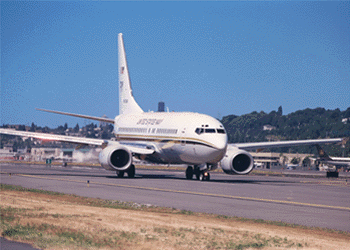
A C-40 Clipper

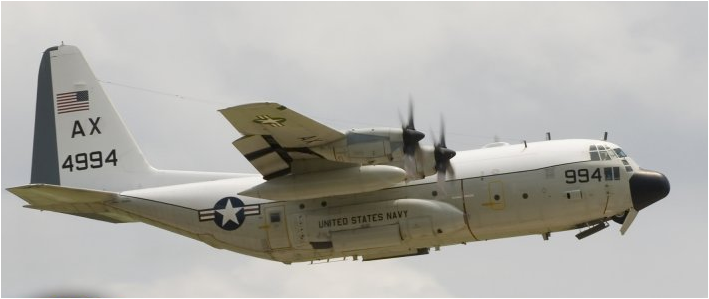
A C-130 Hercules

The VR designator was first established in 1942 to designate "transport" or "air transport" or "fleet logistic air" squadrons. From 1958 to 1976, it designated "fleet tactical support squadron"; from 1976 to the present, it designates "fleet logistics support squadron". Today, all fleet logistics support (VR) squadrons are U.S. Navy Reserve squadrons.

Fleet logistics support squadrons operate Navy unique fleet essential airlift (NUFEA) on a worldwide basis to provide responsive, flexible, and rapidly deployable air logistics support required to sustain combat operations from the sea. During peacetime, squadrons provide air logistics support for all Navy commands as well as provide continuous quality training for mobilization readiness. All fleet logistics support (VR) squadrons are Navy Reserve squadrons with no counterparts in the regular Navy. They represent 100% of the Navy's medium and heavy intra-theater airlift, and operate year-round around the world, providing the critical link between deployed seagoing units and the USAF Air Mobility Command logistics hubs. VR-1 provides dedicated airlift support to the Office of the Secretary of the Navy, Chief of Naval Operations and Commandant of the Marine Corps.

The headquarters of the Fleet Logistics Support Wing is based at Naval Air Station Joint Reserve Base Fort Worth, TX, but the squadrons of the wing are based across the country from the east coast to Hawaii. In addition to the VR squadrons, the Fleet Logistics Support Wing also operates an "executive transport detachment" with one C-37A based in Hawaii alongside the USAF's 65th Airlift Squadron which operates two C-37As.

Note: The parenthetical (2nd), (3rd), or (second use), (third use), etc., appended to some designations in the table below are not part of the squadron designation system. They are added to indicate that the designation was used more than once during the history of U.S. Naval Aviation and which use of the designation is indicated. Absence indicates that the designation was used only once.

Squadron designation	Insignia	Nickname	Aircraft	Functional Wing	Squadron lineage	Station	Notes	Tail Code
VR-1 (third use)		Star Lifters	C-37B	Fleet Logistics Support Wing	VR-1(3rd): 1 May 1997—present	Joint Base Andrews	U.S. Navy Reserve	(Note: This squadron has no assigned tail code. A small American flag and the aircraft's three-digit Bureau Number suffix are displayed in lieu of a tail code)
VR-51 (second use)		Windjammers	C-40A	Fleet Logistics Support Wing	VR-51(2nd): 1 Jun 1997—present	MCAS Kaneohe Bay	U.S. Navy Reserve	RG (Note: VR squadrons flying the C-40 do not display their assigned tail code, instead a small American flag and the aircraft's three-digit Bureau Number suffix are displayed in lieu of the tail code)
VR-53		Capital Express	C-130T	Fleet Logistics Support Wing	VR-53: 1 Oct 1992—present	Joint Base Andrews	U.S. Navy Reserve	AX
VR-54 (second use)		Revelers	C-130T	Fleet Logistics Support Wing	VR-54 (2nd): 1 Jun 1991—present	NAS JRB New Orleans	U.S. Navy Reserve	CW
VR-55		Minutemen	C-130T	Fleet Logistics Support Wing	VR-55: 1 Apr 1976—present	NBVC Pt. Mugu	U.S. Navy Reserve	RU
VR-56		Globemasters	C-40A	Fleet Logistics Support Wing	VR-56: 1 Jul 1976—present	NAS Oceana	U.S. Navy Reserve	JU
VR-57		Conquistadors	C-40A	Fleet Logistics Support Wing	VR-57: 1 Nov 1977—present	NAS North Island	U.S. Navy Reserve	RX
VR-58		Sunseekers	C-40A	Fleet Logistics Support Wing	VR-58: 1 Nov 1977—present	NAS Jacksonville	U.S. Navy Reserve	JV
VR-59		Lone Star Express	C-40A	Fleet Logistics Support Wing	VR-59: 1 Oct 1982—present	NAS JRB Fort Worth	U.S. Navy Reserve	RY
VR-61		Islanders	C-40A	Fleet Logistics Support Wing	VR-61: 1 Oct 1982—present	NAS Whidbey Island	U.S. Navy Reserve	RS
VR-62	VR-62 NOMADS Logo	Nomads	C-130T	Fleet Logistics Support Wing	VR-62: 1 Jul 1985—present	NAS Jacksonville (Note: relocated from NAS Brunswick in 2009)	U.S. Navy Reserve	JW
VR-64		Condors	C-130T	Fleet Logistics Support Wing	VP-64: 1 Nov 1970 – 18 Sep 2004; VR-64: 18 Sep 2004—present	Joint Base McGuire, Dix, Lakehurst (Note: relocated from NAS Willow Grove in Mar 2011)	U.S. Navy Reserve	BD

=== Helicopter Maritime Strike (HSM) squadrons ===
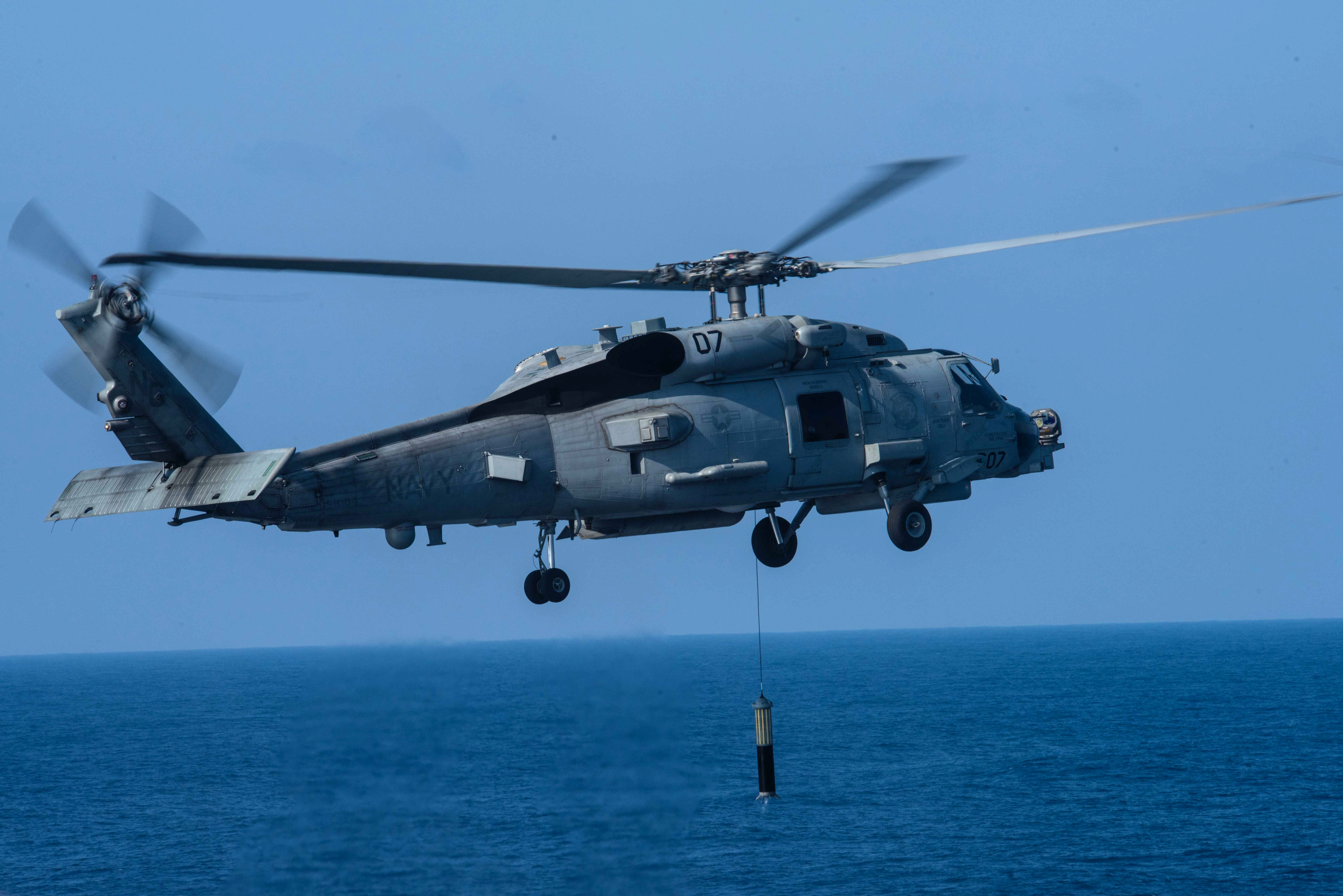
A MH-60R Seahawk

Helicopter maritime strike squadrons fly the MH-60R Seahawk from aircraft carriers, cruisers, destroyers and littoral combat ships. Roles the MH-60R is capable of performing include anti-submarine warfare, anti-surface warfare, electronic warfare, overwater or unopposed search and rescue, naval surface fire support and limited logistics, medical evacuation and humanitarian assistance and disaster relief.

The HSM designation was created in 2005 when HSL-41, the Fleet Replacement Squadron for the MH-60R Seahawk, was redesignated HSM-41. The new designation was created to reflect the MH-60R's multi-mission capabilities which combined the area search capabilities of the Cruiser, Destroyer and Frigate based SH-60B flown by Helicopter Anti-Submarine (Light) (HSL) squadrons with the dipping sonar of the SH-60F flown by Aircraft Carrier-based Helicopter Antisubmarine (HS) squadrons. The first operational fleet squadron to receive the MH-60R was HSM-71 in fiscal year 2008. With the transition of the HS squadrons to HSC squadrons without any ASW capability and the disestablishment of the last Sea Control (VS) squadrons, all ship based airborne ASW capabilities now reside in the HSM squadrons.

From 2008 to 2016 all Helicopter Anti-Submarine (Light) (HSL) squadrons transitioned to the MH-60R and were redesignated Helicopter Maritime Strike (HSM) squadrons; additionally, five new HSM squadrons were established. This provided one HSM squadron for each carrier air wing and six non-carrier air wing land-based squadrons to provide detachments to surface combatants. The non-carrier air wing land based squadrons are called "expeditionary" squadrons. Additionally there was one Navy Reserve expeditionary squadron as well. An additional expeditionary squadron was established later in 2021 and in 2026 a second Navy Reserve squadron was established. Carrier air wing squadrons are composed of eleven helicopters. They deploy aboard aircraft carriers with their carrier air wing and also provide detachments aboard the surface combatants of the carrier strike group. (Note: only five of the eleven helicopters embark aboard the aircraft carrier, the remaining six embark in detachments of two helicopters each in the carrier strike group's surface combatants (cruiser and/or destroyers)) Expeditionary squadrons are comprised of either ten or fifteen helicopters and provide single helicopter detachments to littoral combat ships and dual helicopter detachments to destroyers which deploy independently, not as part of a carrier strike group. (Note: 10 helicopters is the standard, however the squadrons based in Hawaii and Atsugi consist of 15 each as those squadrons are each the single provider of detachments to the numerous surface combatants homeported in Pearl Harbor, HI and Yokosuka, Japan) The two Navy Reserve squadrons are composed of seven helicopters each.

Carrier air wing squadrons are operationally assigned to their carrier air wing and administratively to a type wing (Helicopter Maritime Strike Wing Atlantic or Pacific) while expeditionary squadrons and fleet replacement squadrons are assigned only to a type wing which exercises both operational and administrative control over those squadrons. The Navy Reserve squadrons are assigned operationally and administratively to the Navy Reserve's Maritime Support Wing.

The two fleet replacement squadrons are based at Naval Air Station North Island, CA and Naval Station Mayport, FL. Carrier Air Wing squadrons when not deployed are home-ported at Naval Air Station North Island, CA or Naval Air Station Jacksonville, FL. The exception is HSM-77 which is forward deployed to Naval Air Facility Atsugi, Japan with Carrier Air Wing Five. Expeditionary squadrons are based at Naval Air Station North Island, CA, Naval Station Mayport, FL, Marine Corps Air Station Kaneohe Bay, Hawaii and Naval Air Station Jacksonville, FL. Additionally there are two forward deployed expeditionary squadrons, one at Naval Air Facility Atsugi, Japan and the other at Naval Station Rota, Spain.

Squadron designation	Insignia	Nickname	Aircraft	Carrier Air Wing	Type Wing	Squadron lineage	Station	Notes	Tail Code
HSM-35		Magicians	MH-60R		HSMWINGPAC (Note: Helicopter Maritime Strike Wing Pacific)	HSM-35: 2 May 2013 – present	NAS North Island	Expeditionary Squadron (Note: There was an earlier squadron designated HSL-35 also called "Magicians" which existed from 15 Jan 1974 to 4 Dec 1992. This squadron adopted that squadron's name and insignia.)	TG
HSM-37		Easyriders	MH-60R		HSMWINGPAC	HSL-37: 3 Jul 1975 – 1 Oct 2013; HSM-37: 1 Oct 2013–present	MCAS Kanehoe Bay	Expeditionary Squadron	TH
HSM-40		Airwolves	MH-60R		HSMWINGLANT (Note: Helicopter Maritime Strike Wing Atlantic)	HSL-40: 4 Oct 1985 – 1 Nov 2009; HSM-40: 1 Nov 2009–present	NS Mayport	FRS	HK
HSM-41		Seahawks	MH-60R		HSMWINGPAC	HSL-41: 21 Jan 1983 – 8 Dec 2005; HSM-41: 8 Dec 2005–present	NAS North Island	FRS	TS
HSM-46		Grandmasters	MH-60R	CVW-7	HSMWINGLANT	HSL-46: 7 Apr 1988–2012; HSM-46: 2012–present	NAS Jacksonville		*
HSM-48		Vipers	MH-60R		HSMWINGLANT	HSL-48: 7 Sep 1989 – May 2014; HSM-48: May 2014 – present	NS Mayport	Expeditionary Squadron	HR
HSM-49		Scorpions	MH-60R		HSMWINGPAC	HSL-49: 23 Mar 1990 – Apr 2015; HSM-49: Apr 2015–present	NAS North Island	Expeditionary Squadron	TX
HSM-50		Valkyries	MH-60R		HSMWINGLANT	HSM-50: 1 Oct 2021–present	NS Mayport	Expeditionary Squadron	HV
HSM-51		Warlords	MH-60R		HSMWINGPAC	HSL-51: 1 Oct 1991 – Mar 2013; HSM-51: Mar 2013–present	NAF Atsugi	Expeditionary Squadron	TA
HSM-60		Jaguars	MH-60R		Maritime Support Wing	HSL-60: 1 Apr 2001 – Jul 2015; HSM-60: Jul 2015–present	NAS Jacksonville	U.S. Navy Reserve; Expeditionary Squadron	NW
HSM-61			MH-60R		Maritime Support Wing	HSM-61: 30 Sep 2026–present	NAS North Island	U.S. Navy Reserve; Expeditionary Squadron	NW
HSM-70		Spartans	MH-60R	CVW-8	HSMWINGLANT	HSM-70: 1 Mar 2008–present	NAS Jacksonville		*
HSM-71		Raptors	MH-60R	CVW-9	HSMWINGPAC	HSM-71: 1 Jan 2007–present	NAS North Island		*
HSM-72		Proud Warriors	MH-60R	CVW-1	HSMWINGLANT	HSL-42: 5 Oct 1984 – Jan 2013; HSM-72: Jan 2013–present	NAS Jacksonville		*
HSM-73		Battle Cats	MH-60R	CVW-17	HSMWINGPAC	HSL-43: 5 Oct 1984 – Feb 2012; HSM-73: Feb 2012–present	NAS North Island		*
HSM-74		Swamp Fox	MH-60R	CVW-3	HSMWINGLANT	HSL-44: 21 Aug 1986 – Jun 2011; HSM-74: Jun 2011–present	NAS Jacksonville		*
HSM-75		Wolfpack	MH-60R	CVW-11	HSMWINGPAC	HSL-45: 3 Oct 1986 – Feb 2011; HSM-75: Feb 2011–present	NAS North Island		*
HSM-77		Saberhawks	MH-60R	CVW-5	HSMWINGPAC	HSL-47: 25 Sep 1987 – 1 Feb 2009; HSM-77: 1 Feb 2009–present	NAF Atsugi		*
HSM-78		Blue Hawks	MH-60R	CVW-2	HSMWINGPAC	HSM-78: 1 Mar 2012–present	NAS North Island		*
HSM-79		Griffins	MH-60R		HSMWINGLANT	HSM-79: 2 Jun 2016–present	NS Rota	Expeditionary Squadron	HG

*Carrier air wing (CVW) squadrons are marked with the tail code of their assigned CVW.
Naval Air Force Atlantic Fleet CVW tail codes begin with the letter "A": CVW-1 AB, CVW-3 AC, CVW-7 AG, CVW-8 AJ
Naval Air Force Pacific Fleet CVW tail codes begin with the letter "N": CVW-2 NE, CVW-5 NF, CVW-9 NG, CVW-11 NH, CVW-17 NA

=== Helicopter Mine Countermeasures (HM) squadron ===
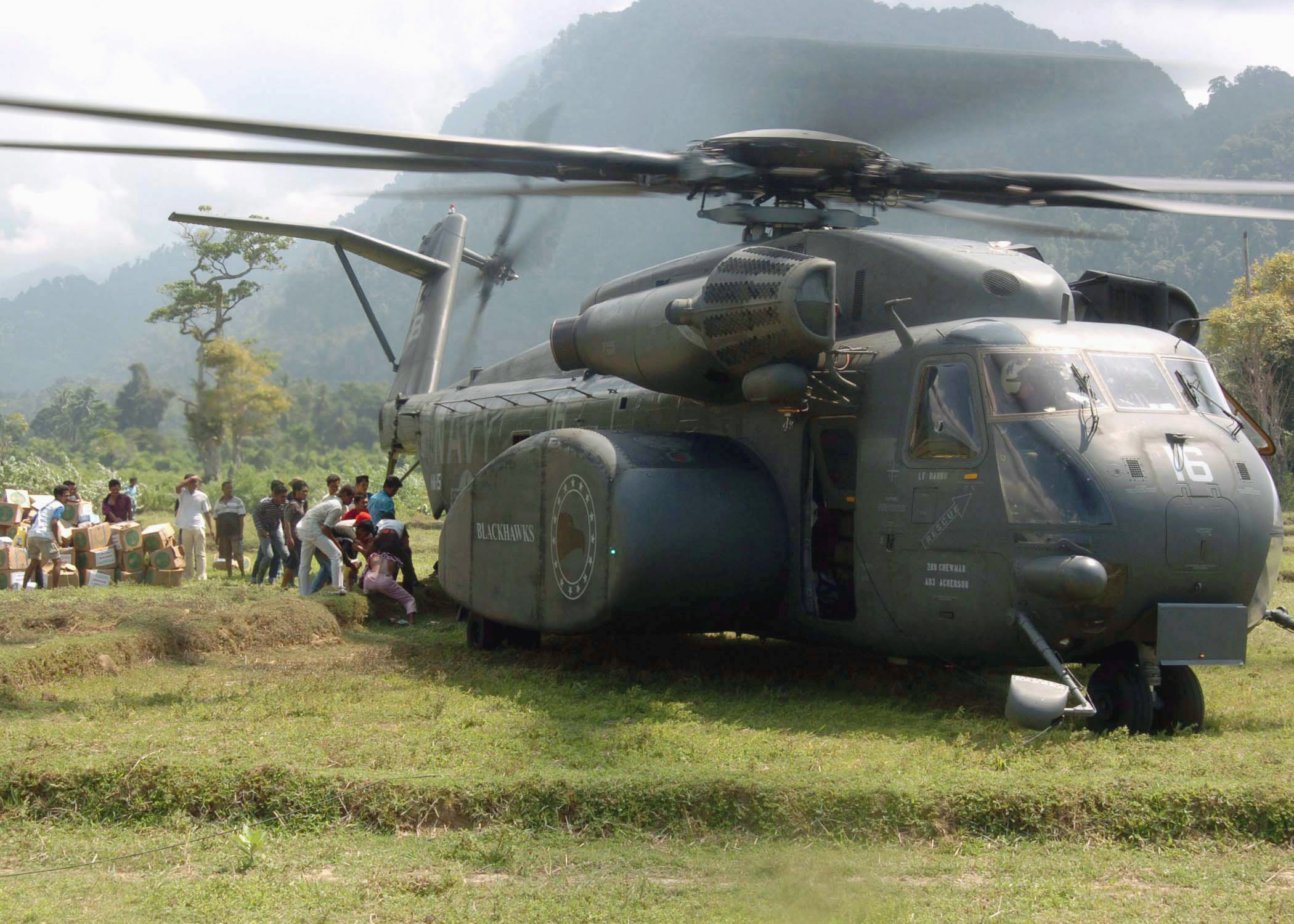
An MH-53 Sea Dragon

The HM designation was created in 1971 to designate "helicopter mine countermeasures squadron". HM squadrons employ Sikorsky MH-53E Sea Dragon helicopters. The primary mission of the Sea Dragon is airborne mine countermeasures (AMCM). The MH-53 can operate from land bases or from aircraft carriers, large amphibious ships or expeditionary sea bases and is capable of towing a variety of mine hunting/sweeping countermeasures systems. The MH-53E Sea Dragon can also carry an impressive amount of cargo, equipment, or number of personnel over long distances. The Sea Dragon is the Navy's only heavy-lift helicopter and until 2025 was the only proven mine countermeasure platform.

In the 1990s the Navy began a multi-decade transition from operating eight different type/model/series helicopters aiming to reduce to just two by the 2010s, the MH-60R and the MH-60S. It recognized however that the replacement of the MH-53E in the mine countermeasures role was dependent on technology which had not yet matured. As a result, HM squadrons continued in service with the only helicopter capable of effectively conducting airborne mine countermeasures. In 2025 that technology finally matured enough to allow MH-60S helicopters of Sea Combat Squadrons (HSC) to assume the airborne mine countermeasures role in conjunction with mine warfare configured Littoral Combat Ships finally allowing for the ultimate retirement of the MH-53E. At the beginning of this transition the Navy operated four HM squadrons (two of them USNR) plus a Fleet Replacement Squadron, by the end of 2025 only a single operational HM squadron remained and that squadron is programmed for deactivation in fiscal year 2027.

Disestablished and deactivated HM squadrons can be found here: Disestablished or deactivated HM squadrons

Squadron designation	Insignia	Nickname	Aircraft	Type Wing	Squadron lineage	Station	Tail Code
HM-15		Blackhawks	MH-53E	HSCWINGLANT (Note: Helicopter Sea Combat Wing Atlantic)	HM-15: 2 Jan 1987–present	NS Norfolk (Note: With one detachment in Pohang, Korea inherited from HM-14 when that squadron was deactivated in March 2023. There was also a detachment at NSA Bahrain until it was shut down in August 2025 as part of the MH-53E divestment)	TB

=== Helicopter Sea Combat (HSC) squadrons ===
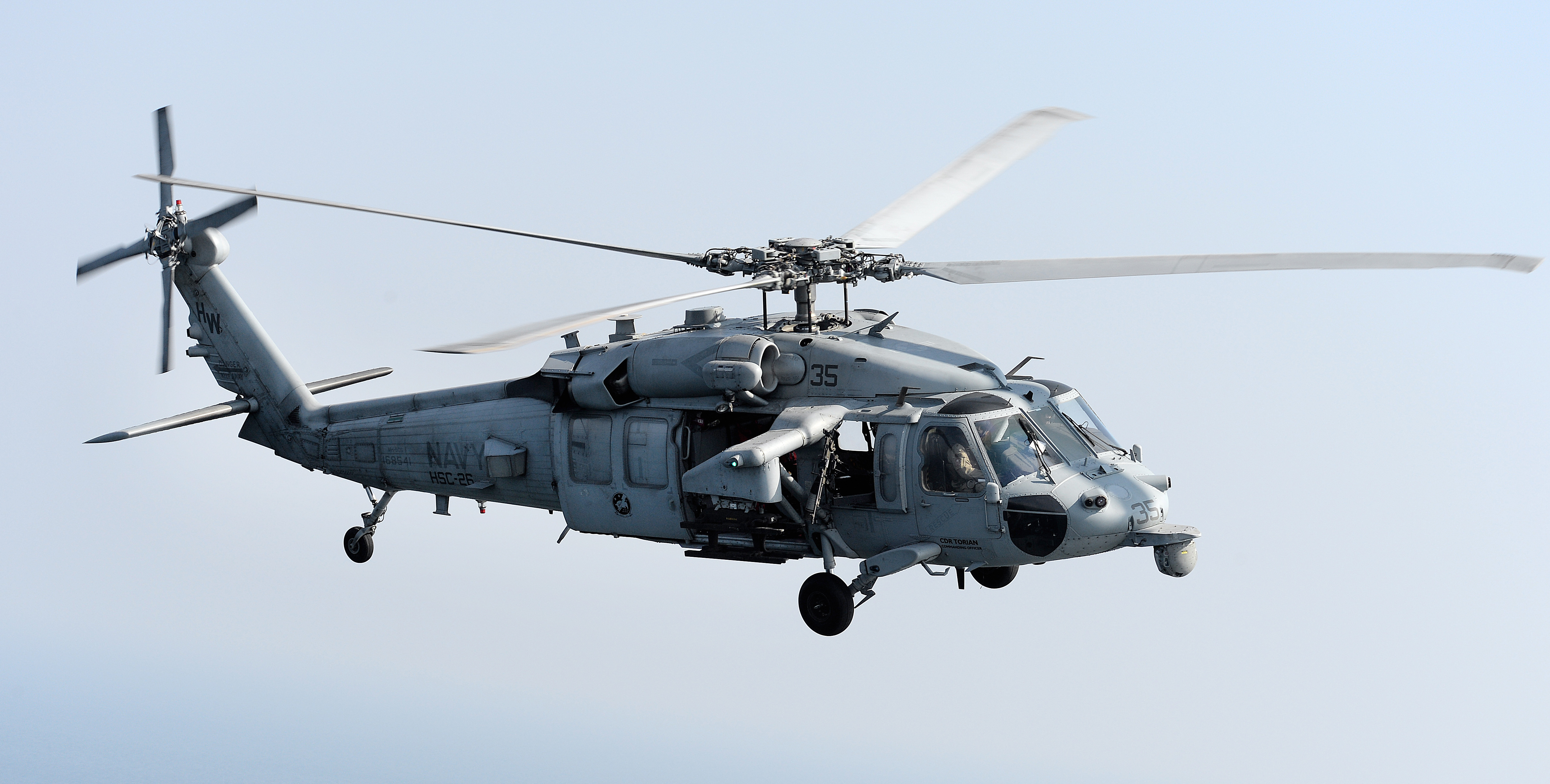
MH-60S Seahawk

Helicopter sea combat squadrons fly the MH-60S Seahawk from aircraft carriers, littoral combat ships, amphibious assault ships, logistics ships, command ships and hospital ships. Roles the MH-60S is capable of performing include logistics, overwater search and rescue, anti-surface warfare, airborne mine countermeasures, overland combat search and rescue, naval special warfare support, medical evacuation and humanitarian assistance and disaster relief.

The HSC designation was created in 2005 after the Helicopter Combat Support (HC) squadrons equipped with the H-46 Sea Knight had completed their transitions to the new multi-mission MH-60S Seahawk, and in anticipation of the upcoming transition of the Helicopter Antisubmarine (HS) squadrons from the SH-60F and HH-60H Seahawks to the new MH-60S which began in 2007. The ASW capabilities resident in the HS squadrons were lost in the transition but the new HSC squadrons combine the at sea logistics capability of the former Helicopter Combat Support (HC) squadrons with greatly upgraded Combat Search and Rescue, Naval Special Warfare Support and Anti-Surface Warfare capabilities of the former Helicopter Anti-submarine (HS) squadrons.

The HSC squadrons which were formerly HS squadrons are carrier based and deploy as part of a carrier air wing. Carrier based HSC squadrons are composed of five helicopters each. HSC squadrons which were formerly HC squadrons or were newly established are land based squadrons. These land based squadrons are called "expeditionary" squadrons and are each composed of twelve helicopters which deploy in detachments of between one and three helicopters aboard littoral combat ships, amphibious assault ships, logistics ships, command ships or hospital ships, or for land based deployments as required.

Carrier air wing squadrons are operationally assigned to their carrier air wing and administratively to a Type Wing (Helicopter Sea Combat Wing Atlantic or Pacific) while expeditionary squadrons and Fleet Replacement Squadrons are assigned only to a type wing which exercises both operational and administrative control over those squadrons.

The two Fleet Replacement Squadrons are based at Naval Air Station North Island, CA and Naval Station Norfolk, VA. Carrier Air Wing squadrons when not deployed are home-ported at Naval Air Station North Island, CA or Naval Station Norfolk, VA. The exception is HSC-12 which is forward deployed to Naval Air Facility Atsugi, Japan with Carrier Air Wing Five. Expeditionary squadrons are based at Naval Air Station North Island, CA, Naval Station Norfolk, VA and Andersen Air Force Base, Guam.

Deactivated HSC squadrons can be found here: Deactivated HSC squadrons

Note: The parenthetical (2nd) used in the lineage column of table below is not a part of the squadron designation system. It is added to indicate that the designation was used for two separate squadrons during the history of U.S. Naval Aviation.

Squadron designation	Insignia	Nickname	Aircraft	Carrier Air Wing	Type Wing	Squadron lineage	Station	Notes	Tail Code
HSC-2		Fleet Angels	MH-60S		HSCWINGLANT	HC-2(2nd): (Note: There was an earlier squadron designated HC-2 also called "Fleet Angels" from 1 Apr 1948 to 30 Sep 1977) 1 Apr 1987 – 24 Aug 2005; HSC-2: 24 Aug 2005–present	NS Norfolk	FRS	HU
HSC-3		Merlins	MH-60S		HSCWINGPAC (Note: Helicopter Sea Combat Wing Pacific)	HC-3: 1 Sep 1967 – 31 Oct 2005; HSC-3: 31 Oct 2005–present	NAS North Island	FRS	SA
HSC-4		Black Knights	MH-60S	CVW-2	HSCWINGPAC	HS-4: 30 Jun 1952 – Mar 2012; HSC-4: Mar 2012–present	NAS North Island		*
HSC-5		Nightdippers	MH-60S	CVW-7	HSCWINGLANT	HS-5: 3 Jan 1956 – 28 Feb 2009: HSC-5: 28 Feb 2009–present	NS Norfolk		*
HSC-6		Indians	MH-60S	CVW-17	HSCWINGPAC	HS-6: 1 Jun 1956 – Jul 2011; HSC-6: Jul 2011–present	NAS North Island		*
HSC-7		Dusty Dogs	MH-60S	CVW-3	HSCWINGLANT	HS-7(2nd): (Note: There was an earlier squadron designated HS-7 called the "Big Dippers" from 2 Apr 1956 to 31 May 1966) 15 Dec 1969 – Apr 2011; HSC-7: Apr 2011–present	NS Norfolk		*
HSC-8		Eightballers	MH-60S	CVW-11	HSCWINGPAC	HS-8(2nd): (Note: There was an earlier squadron designated HS-8 also called "Eighballers" from 1 Jun 1956 to 31 Dec 1968) 1 Nov 1969 – 1 Apr 2007; HSC-8: 1 Apr 2007–present	NAS North Island		*
HSC-9		Tridents	MH-60S	CVW-8	HSCWINGLANT	HS-3: 18 Jun 1952 – 1 Jun 2009; HSC-9: 1 Jun 2009–present	NS Norfolk		*
HSC-11		Dragon Slayers	MH-60S	CVW-1	HSCWINGLANT	HS-11: 27 Jun 1957 – Jun 2016; HSC-11: Jun 2016–present	NS Norfolk		*
HSC-12		Golden Falcons	MH-60S	CVW-5	HSCWINGPAC	HS-2: 7 Mar 1952 – 1 Jan 2009; HSC-12: 1 Jan 2009–present	NAF Atsugi	(Note: oldest currently active operational Navy helicopter squadron (training squadron HT-8 is older)) (Note: Also operates an "Executive Transport Detachment" supporting Commander, U. S. Seventh Fleet)	*
HSC-14		Chargers	MH-60S	CVW-9	HSCWINGPAC	HS-14: 19 Jul 1984 – Jul 2013; HSC-14: Jul 2013–present	NAS North Island		*
HSC-21		Blackjacks	MH-60S		HSCWINGPAC	HC-11: 1 Oct 1977 – 7 Nov 2005; HSC-21: 7 Nov 2005–present	NAS North Island	Expeditionary Squadron	VR
HSC-22		Sea Knights	MH-60S		HSCWINGLANT	HSC-22: 1 Oct 2006–present (Inactive 30 Jun 2023-31 Mar 2026)	NS Norfolk	Expeditionary Squadron	AM
HSC-23		Wildcards	MH-60S		HSCWINGPAC	HSC-23: 1 Oct 2006–present	NAS North Island	Expeditionary Squadron	WC
HSC-25		Island Knights	MH-60S		HSCWINGPAC	HC-5(2nd): (Note: There was an earlier squadron designated HC-5 called the "Arch Angels" from 1 Sep 1967 to Mar 1972) 3 Feb 1984 – 24 Oct 2005; HSC 25: 24 Oct 2005–present	Andersen AFB (Note: One detachment at NAF Atsugi which deploys aboard the Amphibious Assault Ship forward deployed to U.S Fleet Activities Sasebo)	Expeditionary Squadron	RB
HSC-26		Chargers	MH-60S		HSCWINGLANT	HC-6: 1 Sep 1967 – 24 Aug 2005; HSC-26: 24 Aug 2005–present	NS Norfolk (Note: One detachment at NSA Bahrain supporting Commander, U.S. Fifth Fleet)	Expeditionary Squadron	HW
HSC-28		Dragon Whales	MH-60S		HSCWINGLANT	HC-8: 3 Dec 1984 – 13 May 2005; HSC-28: 13 May 2005 – present	NS Norfolk (Note: One detachment at NAS Sigonella supporting Commander, U.S. Sixth Fleet)	Expeditionary Squadron	BR

*Carrier air wing (CVW) squadrons are marked with the tail code of their assigned CVW.
Naval Air Force Atlantic Fleet CVW tail codes begin with the letter "A": CVW-1 AB, CVW-3 AC, CVW-7 AG, CVW-8 AJ
Naval Air Force Pacific Fleet CVW tail codes begin with the letter "N": CVW-2 NE, CVW-5 NF, CVW-9 NG, CVW-11 NH, CVW-17 NA

=== Patrol (VP) squadrons ===
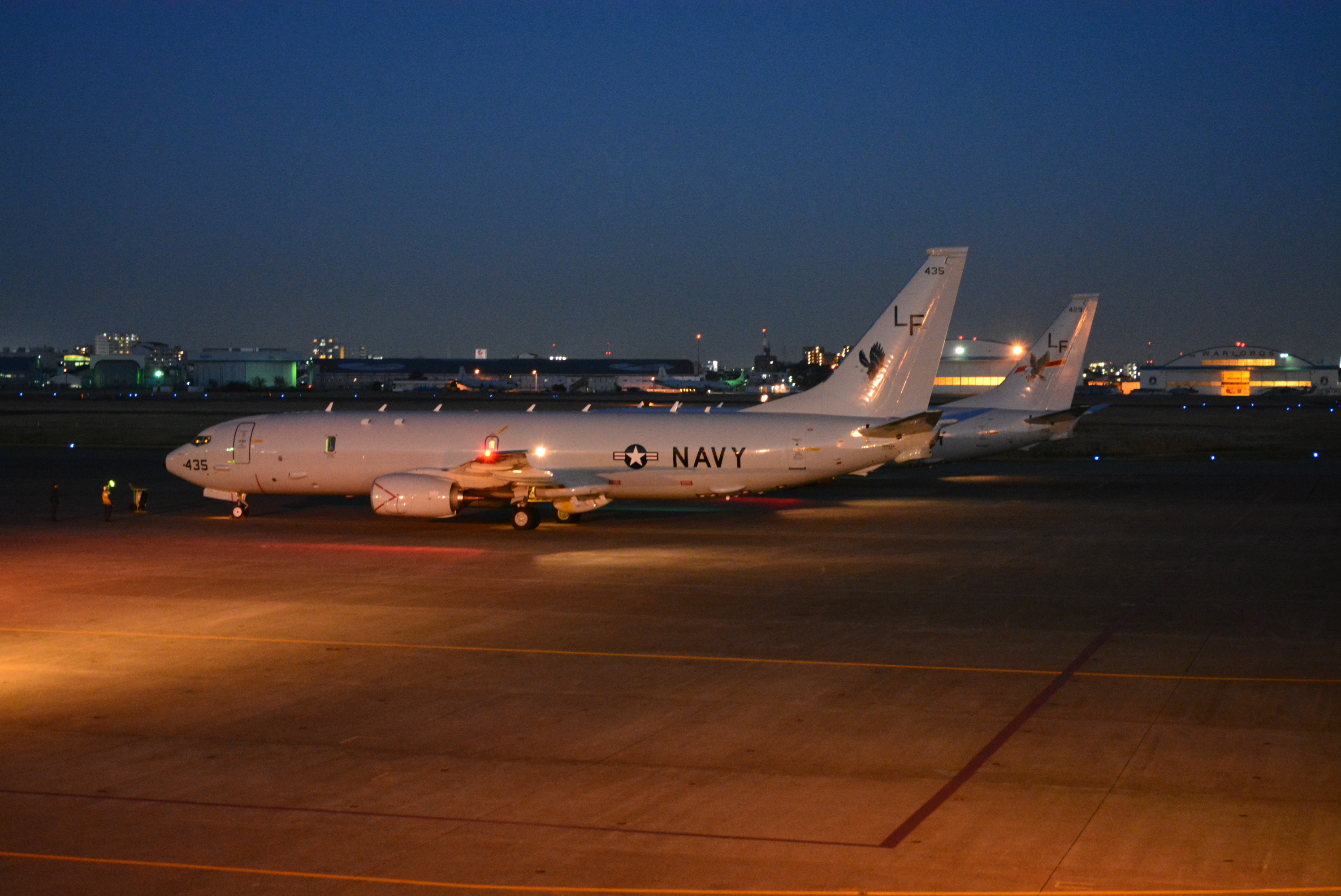
A P-8A Poseidon

The VP designation is one of the oldest in the U.S. Navy and is the oldest designation currently in use. It first appeared in 1922 to designate "Seaplane Patrol Squadron" and from 1924 it has designated "Patrol Squadron".

Patrol (VP) squadrons are made up of six P-8A Poseidon maritime patrol aircraft used primarily in reconnaissance, anti-surface warfare and anti-submarine warfare roles. Volume 2 of the Dictionary of American Naval Aviation Squadrons contains comprehensive histories of over 150 patrol squadrons.

When not deployed VP squadrons are home-ported at Naval Air Station Jacksonville, FL or Naval Air Station Whidbey Island, WA. The single Fleet Replacement Squadron which serves both the Atlantic and Pacific Fleets is based at Naval Air Station Jacksonville, FL

Note: The parenthetical (1st), (2nd), (3rd) and (first use), (second use) etc... appended to some designations in the table below are not part of the squadron designation system. They are added to indicate that the designation was used more than once during the history of U.S. Naval Aviation and which use of the designation is indicated. Absence indicates that the designation was used only once.

Squadron designation	Insignia	Nickname	Aircraft	Functional Wing	Squadron lineage (Note: Past squadron designations appearing below: VB Bombing (landplane squadrons), VPB Patrol Bombing, VP-ML Medium Landplane, VP-MS Medium Seaplane, VP-HL Heavy Landplane)	Station	Notes	Tail Code
VP-1 (Fifth use)		Screaming Eagles	P-8A	PATRECONWING TEN (Note: Patrol and Reconnaissance Wing TEN)	VB-128: 15 Feb 1943 – 1 Oct 1944; VPB-128: 1 Oct 1944–15 May 1946; VP-128: 15 May 1946–15 Nov 1946; VP-ML-1: 15 Nov 1946 – 1 Sep 1948; VP-1(5th): 1 Sep 1948–present	NAS Whidbey Island		YB
VP-4 (Second use)		Skinny Dragons	P-8A	PATRECONWING TEN	VB-144: 1 Jul 1943 – 1 Oct 1944; VPB-144: 1 Oct 1944–15 May 1946; VP-144: 15 May 1946–15 Nov 1946; VP-ML-4: 15 Nov 1946 – 1 Sep 1948; VP-4(2nd): 1 Sep 1948–present	NAS Whidbey Island		YD
VP-5 (Second use)		Mad Foxes	P-8A	PATRECONWING ELEVEN (Note: Patrol and Reconnaissance Wing ELEVEN)	VP-17F: 2 Jan 1937 – 1 Oct 1937; VP-17(1st): 1 Oct 1937 – 1 Jul 1939; VP-42(1st): 1 Jul 1939–15 Feb 1943; VB-135: 15 Feb 1943 – 1 Oct 1944; VPB-135: 1 Oct 1944–15 May 1946; VP-135: 15 May 1946–15 Nov 1946; VP-ML-5: 15 Nov 1946 – 1 Sep 1948; VP-5(2nd): 1 Sep 1948–present	NAS Jacksonville		LA
VP-8 (Second use)		Tigers	P-8A	PATRECONWING ELEVEN	VP-201: 1 Sep 1942 – 1 Oct 1944; VPB-201: 1 Oct 1944–15 May 1946; VP-201: 15 May 1946–15 Nov 1946; VP-MS-1: 15 Nov 1946 – 5 Jun 1947; VP-ML-8: 5 Jun 1947 – 1 Sep 1948; VP-8(2nd): 1 Sep 1948–present	NAS Jacksonville		LC
VP-9 (Second use)		Golden Eagles	P-8A	PATRECONWING TEN	VP-9(2nd): 15 Mar 1951–present	NAS Whidbey Island		PD
VP-10 (Third use)		Red Lancers	P-8A	PATRECONWING ELEVEN	VP-10(3rd): 19 Mar 1951–present	NAS Jacksonville		LD
VP-16 (Third use)		War Eagles	P-8A	PATRECONWING ELEVEN	VP-906: May 1946 – 15 Nov 1946; VP-ML-56: 15 Nov 1946 – Feb 1950; VP-741: Feb 1959 – 4 Feb 1953: VP-16(3rd): 4 Feb 1953–present	NAS Jacksonville	(Note: USNR VP-741 activated on 1 May 1951 for the Korean War)	LF
VP-26 (Third use)		Tridents	P-8A	PATRECONWING ELEVEN	VB-114: 26 Aug 1943 – 1 Oct 1944; VPB-114: 1 Oct 1944–15 May 1946; VP-114: 15 May 1946–15 Nov 1946; VP-HL-6: 15 Nov 1946 – 1 Sep 1948; VP-26(3rd): 1 Sep 1948–present	NAS Jacksonville		LK
VP-30		Pro's Nest	P-8A; MQ-4C (Note: VP-30 is the FRS for both the P-8 flying VP squadrons and for the MQ-4 flying VUP squadrons)	Direct report to Commander, Patrol and Reconnaissance Group (Note: VP-30, PATRECONWING TEN and PATRECONWING ELEVEN report to Commander, Patrol and Reconnaissance Group who in turn reports to both Commander, Naval Air Force Atlantic and Commander, Naval Air Force Pacific)	VP-30: 30 Jun 1960–present	NAS Jacksonville	FRS	LL
VP-40 (Second use)		Fighting Marlins	P-8A	PATRECONWING TEN	VP-40(2nd): 20 Jan 1951–present	NAS Whidbey Island		QE
VP-45 (Third use)		Pelicans	P-8A	PATRECONWING ELEVEN	VP-205(1st): 1 Nov 1942 – 1 Oct 1944; VPB-205: 1 Oct 1944–15 May 1946; VP-205(2nd): 15 May 1946–15 Nov 1946; VP-MS-5: 15 Nov 1946 – 1 Sep 1948; VP-45(3rd): 1 Sep 1948–present	NAS Jacksonville		LN
VP-46		Grey Knights	P-8A	PATRECONWING TEN	VP-5S: 1 Sep 1931 – 1 Apr 1933; VP-5F: 1 Apr 1933–1937; VP-5(1st): 1937-1 Jul 1939; VP-33(1st): 1 Jul 1939 – 1 Jul 1941; VP-32(2nd): 1 Jul 1941 – 1 Oct 1944; VPB-32: 1 Oct 1944–15 May 1946; VP-MS-6: 15 Nov 1946 – 1 Sep 1948; VP-46: 1 Sep 1948–present	NAS Whidbey Island	(Note: Second oldest currently active aircraft squadron in the U.S. Navy)	RC
VP-47		Golden Swordsmen	P-8A	PATRECONWING TEN	VP-27(1st): 1 Jun 1944 – 1 Oct 1944; VPB-27: 1 Oct 1944–15 May 1946; VP-27(2nd): 15 May 1946–15 Nov 1946; VP-MS-7: 15 Nov 1946 – 1 Sep 1948; VP-47: 1 Sep 1948–present	NAS Whidbey Island		RD
VP-62 (Fourth use)		Broadarrows	P-8A	Maritime Support Wing	VP-62(4th): 1 Nov 1970–present	NAS Jacksonville	U.S. Navy Reserve	LT
VP-69		Totems	P-8A	Maritime Support Wing	VP-69: 1 Nov 1970–present	NAS Whidbey Island	U.S. Navy Reserve	PJ

=== Scientific Development (VXS) squadron ===
In 1993 the aircraft of Oceanographic Development Squadron Eight (VXN-8) were transferred to the Naval Research Laboratory's (NRL) Flight Detachment when that squadron was disestablished. In 2004 the NRL Flight Detachment was established as a squadron and designated VXS-1. As VXS-1 the squadron continues the support of a wide range of airborne research projects for the Department of the Navy and other contracting agencies of the U.S. Government.

Squadron designation	Insignia	Nickname	Aircraft	Wing	Squadron lineage	Station	Tail Code
VXS-1		Warlocks	NP-3C, UV-18A, RC-12M, Tiger Shark UAS	VXS-1 is not assigned to a wing, it reports directly to the Commander, Naval Research Laboratory	VXS-1: 13 Dec 2004–present	NAS Patuxent River.	RL

=== Special Projects Patrol (VPU) squadron ===
In 1982 the Special Projects Patrol (VPU) squadron designation was created to designate two squadrons which utilized outwardly appearing normal patrol aircraft but which were specially equipped for intelligence collection. The squadrons were established from "special projects" detachments of VP-4 and VP-26 (which had been created in VP-8 and later transferred to VP-26) which had been in operation since the late 1960s. The squadrons were designated VPU-1 and VPU-2. VPU-1 was deactivated in 2012 leaving only VPU-2 which is attached to Patrol and Reconnaissance Wing ELEVEN based at NAS Jacksonville, FL.

Squadron designation	Insignia	Nickname	Aircraft	Functional Wing	Squadron lineage	Station	Tail Code
VPU-2		Wizards	P-8A	PATRECONWING ELEVEN	VPU-2: 1 Jul 1982–present	NAS Jacksonville	SP

=== Strike Fighter (VFA) squadrons ===
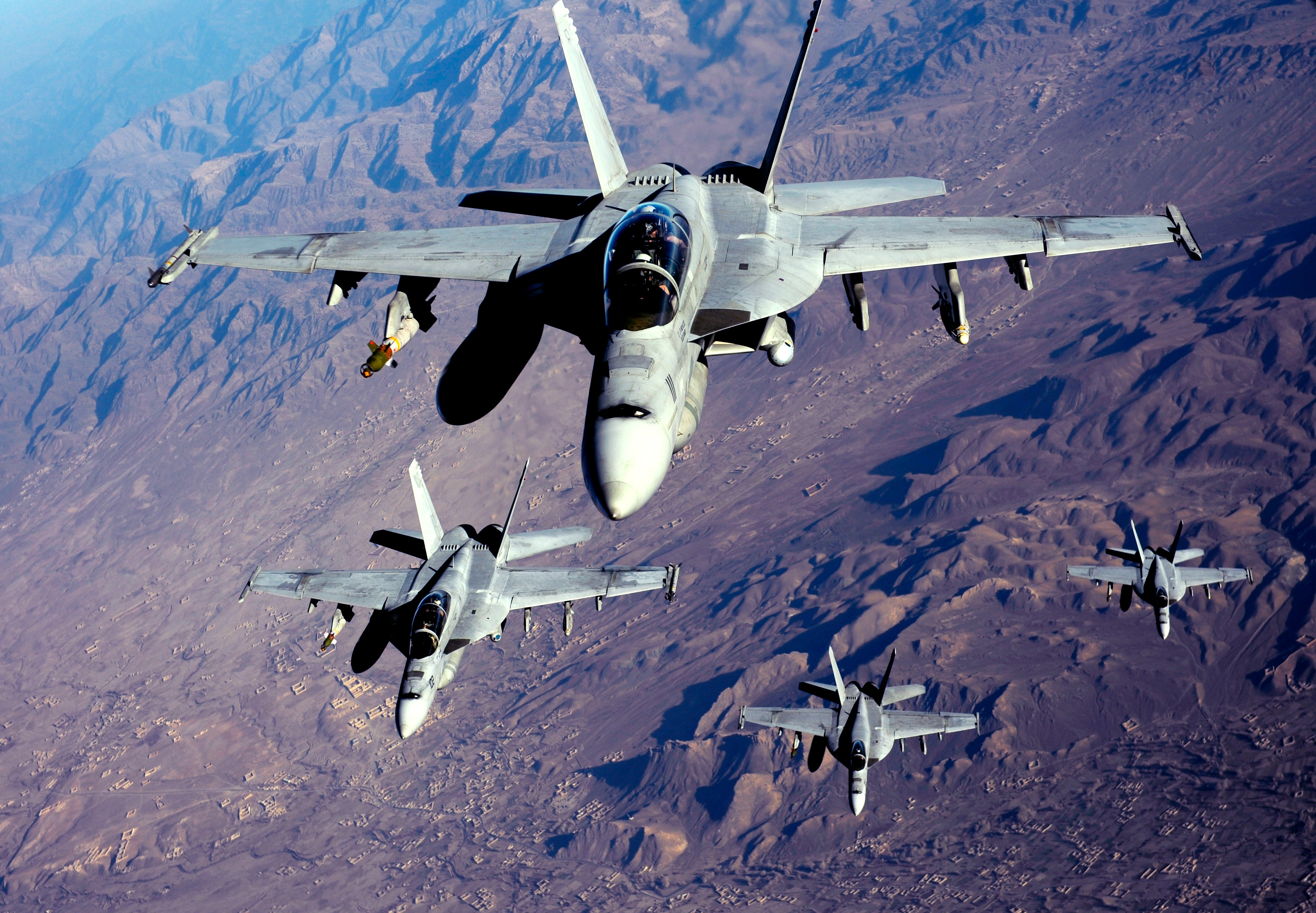
F/A-18Fs being refueled

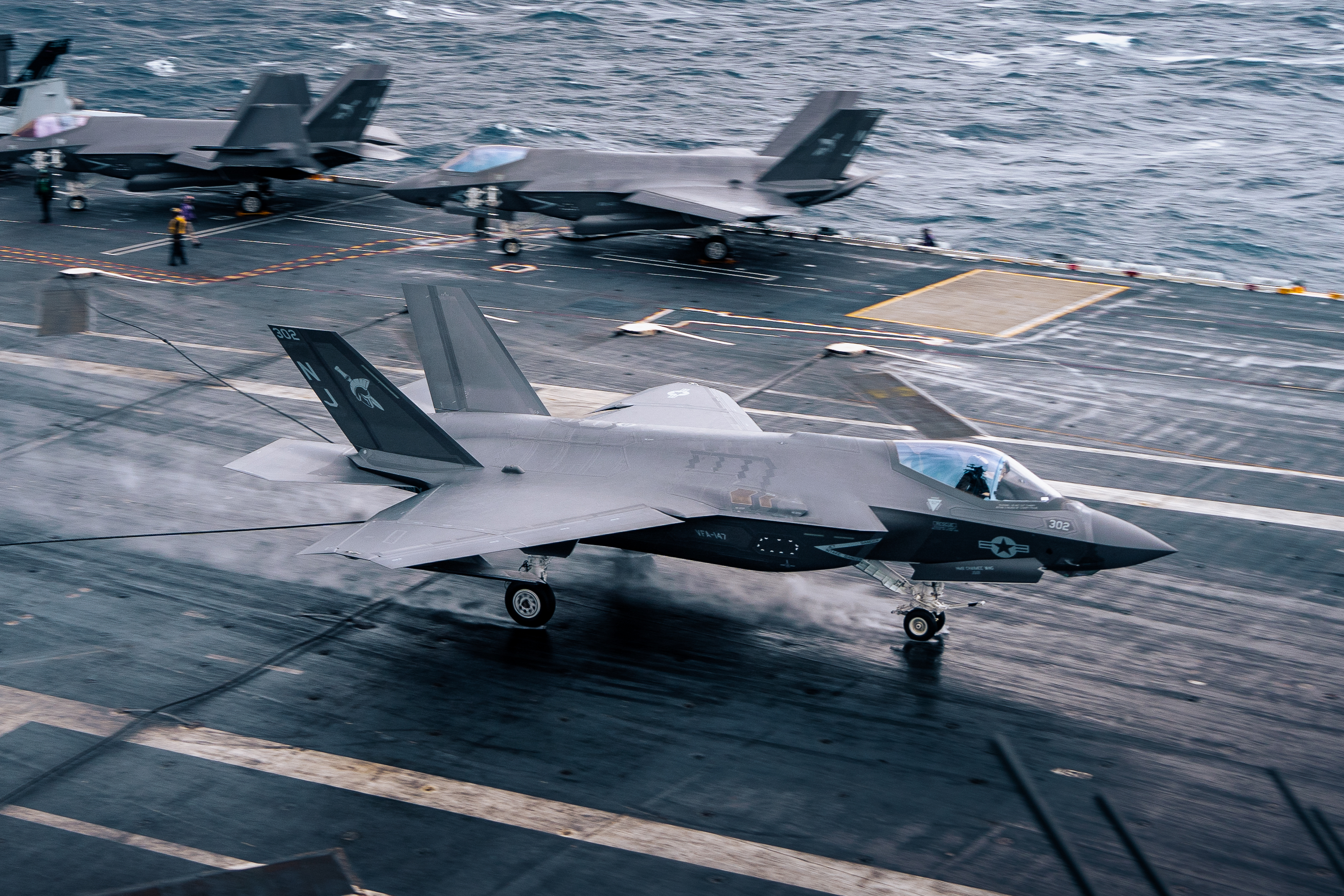
An F-35C

The VFA designation was created in 1980 to designate "Fighter Attack" squadron. The designation was assigned to squadrons equipped with the then new F/A-18A Hornet fighter attack aircraft which replaced the LTV A-7E Corsair II flown by Attack (VA) squadrons. In 1983 the designation was changed to "Strike Fighter" squadron and all VFA squadrons in existence at the time were renamed from "Fighter Attack Squadron-___" to "Strike Fighter Squadron-___". (Note: The Marine Corps had been designating squadrons "Fighter Attack" squadrons since 1961 when it began flying the F-4 Phantom II. It did not participate in the renaming of "Fighter Attack" to "Strike Fighter" and its VMFA squadrons continued to be designated "Fighter Attack" squadrons.) Six of the current VFA squadrons were established after 1980 as fighter attack or strike fighter squadrons; eight were established between 1919 and 1946 as either air-to-air "Fighting" (VF) squadrons, or surface attack "Bombing" (VB) squadrons or "Torpedo" (VT) squadrons or as dual role "Bombing/Fighting" (VBF) squadrons; and twenty-three were established after 1946 as "Fighter" (VF) squadrons or air-to-surface/ground "Attack" (VA) squadrons. (Note: In 1946 all VB and VT squadrons still in existence were redesignated "Attack" (VA) squadrons and all VBF squadrons still in existence were designated Fighter (VF) squadrons.) Some squadrons have been designated as both VF and VA squadrons at different times during the course of their existence. (Note: The Navy's oldest currently active aircraft squadron is VFA-14. In addition to being designated as a Fighting or Fighter (VF), Torpedo (VT), Bombing (VB) and Attack (VA) squadron at some point in its history it was also designated a Patrol (VP) and Scouting (VS) squadron as well.)

A Strike Fighter Squadron consists of either ten or twelve F/A-18E single seat Super Hornets, twelve F/A-18F two seat Super Hornets or fourteen F-35C Lightning IIs. Fleet Replacement Squadrons may have more aircraft.

The Super Hornet is an all-weather aircraft used for attack and fighter missions. As a fighter it is used as a fighter escort and for fleet air defense; as an attack aircraft it is used for force projection, interdiction and close and deep air support. It is also used for Suppression of Enemy Air Defenses (SEAD) and for aerial refueling. It replaced the "legacy" F/A-18A and C model Hornets and the F-14D Tomcat flown by the Navy's last Fighter (VF) squadrons. The last F-14D Tomcat squadron transitioned to the Super Hornet in 2006 and the last active component F/A-18C Hornet squadron began its transition to the Super Hornet in February 2019.

The F-35C is a fifth-generation strike fighter that was originally planned to replace the F/A-18C Hornet with two F-35C squadrons planned to operate alongside two super hornet squadrons in each carrier air wing, but expiring F/A-18C service life and delays in F-35C procurement forced the Navy to increase its buy of F/A-18E and F Super Hornets to replace F/A-18C Hornets while awaiting the arrival of the F-35C. The first deployable squadron to transition to the F-35C was a Super Hornet squadron in 2018. Ultimately each Carrier Air Wing will be equipped with three Super Hornet squadrons and one F-35C squadron.

All deployable VFA squadrons are operationally assigned to a Carrier Air Wing (CVW), four VFA squadrons to each CVW, (Note: there are 34 operational USN VFA squadrons which is two short to completely fill nine CVWs with two USMC VMFA squadrons filling those two spots) and administratively to a Type Wing; either Joint Strike Fighter Wing, Strike Fighter Wing, Atlantic or Strike Fighter Wing, Pacific. The three Fleet Replacement Squadrons are assigned both operationally and administratively, one to each Type Wing.

Deployable VFA squadrons are home-ported at Naval Air Station Lemoore, CA or Naval Air Station Oceana, VA when not deployed, except for the squadrons of CVW-5 which are forward deployed to Marine Corps Air Station Iwakuni, Japan with Carrier Air Wing FIVE. The single F-35C Fleet Replacement Squadron is based at Naval Air Station Lemoore, CA. The two Super Hornet Fleet Replacement Squadrons are based at Naval Air Station Lemoore, CA and Naval Air Station Oceana, VA.

Disestablished and deactivated VFA squadrons can be found here: Disestablished or deactivated VFA squadrons

Note: The parenthetical (1st), (2nd), (3rd) etc... appended to some designations in the lineage column of table below are not a part of the squadron designation system. They are added to indicate that the designation was used more than once during the history of U.S. Naval Aviation and which use of the designation is indicated. Absence indicates that the designation was used only once.

Squadron designation	Insignia	Nickname	Aircraft	Carrier Air Wing (Note: Note: VFA squadrons are frequently reassigned from one Carrier Air Wing to another as required by aircraft carrier maintenance schedules and VFA squadron readiness cycles therefore this table will frequently be out of date with regard to CVW assignment. Also, two CVWs will be assigned only three VFA squadrons with the fourth "slot" in each of those two CVWs filled by a USMC VMFA squadron)	Type Wing	Squadron lineage (Note: squadron designations appearing below: VF-Fighting or Fighter, VA-Attack, VB-Bombing, VT-Torpedo, VS-Scouting, VBF-Bombing/Fighting, VP-Seaplane Patrol)	Station	Notes	Tail Code
VFA-2		Bounty Hunters	F/A-18F	CVW-2	STRKFIGHTWINGPAC (Note: Strike Fighter Wing Pacific)	VF-2(5th): 14 Oct 1972 – 21 Jul 2003; VFA-2: 21 Jul 2003–present	NAS Lemoore	(Note: One of two squadrons established on 14 October 1972 (the other being VF-1(5th) which was disestablished in 1993) as the first to operate the then new F-14A Tomcat)	*
VFA-11		Red Rippers	F/A-18F	CVW-1	STRKFIGHTWINGLANT (Note: Strike Fighter Wing Atlantic)	VF-43(4th): 1 Sep 1950 – 16 Feb 1959; VF-11(3rd): 16 Feb 1959–18 Oct 2005; VFA-11: 18 Oct 2005–present	NAS Oceana	(Note: Second "Red Rippers" squadron. The original "Red Rippers" squadron existed from 1 Feb 1927 to 15 Feb 1959 and was designated VF-5(1st), VF-5S(1st), VF-5B(1st), VB-1B, VF-5B, VF-5S(2nd), VF-5B(3rd), VF-4(2nd), VF-41(1st), VF-4(4th), VF-1A and finally VF-11(2nd) during the course of its existence. This squadron adopted the "Red Rippers" name and insignia when it was redesignated VF-11(3rd) on 16 Feb 1969)	*
VFA-14		Tophatters	F/A-18E	CVW-9	STRKFIGHTWINGPAC	Air Det Pac Flt: Sep 1919 – 15 Jun 1920; VT-5(1st): 15 Jun 1920 – 7 Sep 1921; VP-1-4: 7 Dec 1921–23 Sep 1921; VF-4(1st) 23 Sep 1921 – 1 Jul 1922; VF-1(1st): 1 Jul 1922 – 1 Jul 1927; VF-1B(1st): 1 Jul 1927 – 1 Jul 1934; VB-2B: 1 Jul 1934 – 1 Jul 1937; VB-3: 1 Jul 1937 – 1 Jul 1939; VB-4: 1 Jul 1939–15 Mar 1941; VS-41(2nd): 15 Mar 1941 – 1 Mar 1943; VB-41: 1 Mar 1943 – 4 Aug 1943; VB-4: 4 Aug 1943–15 Nov 1946; VA-1A: 15 Nov 1946 – 2 Aug 1948; VA-14: 2 Aug 1948–15 Dec 1949; VF-14(2nd): 15 Dec 1949 – 1 Dec 2001; VFA-14: 1 Dec 2001–present	NAS Lemoore	(Note: Oldest currently active aircraft squadron in the U.S. Navy)	*
VFA-22		Fighting Redcocks	F/A-18F	CVW-17	STRKFIGHTWINGPAC	VF-63: 28 Jul 1948 – Mar 1956; VA-63: Mar 1956 – 1 Jul 1959; VA-22: 1 Jul 1959 – 4 May 1990; VFA-22: 4 May 1990 – present	NAS Lemoore		*
VFA-25		Fist of the Fleet	F/A-18E	CVW-11	STRKFIGHTWINGPAC	VT-17: 1 Jan 1943 – 15 Nov 1946; VA-6B: 15 Nov 1946–27 Jul 1948; VA-65(1st): 27 Jul 1948 – 1 Jul 1959; VA-25(2nd): 1 Jul 1959 – 1 Jul 1983; VFA-25: 1 Jul 1983–present	NAS Lemoore		*
VFA-27		Royal Maces	F/A-18E	CVW-5	STRKFIGHTWINGPAC	VA-27: 1 Sep 1967 – 24 Jan 1991; VFA-27: 24 Jan 1991–present	MCAS Iwakuni		*
VFA-31		Tomcatters	F/A-18E	CVW-8	STRKFIGHTWINGLANT	VF-1B(2nd): 1 Jul 1935 – 1 Jul 1937; VF-6(2nd): 1 Jul 1937–15 Jul 1943; VF-3(3rd): 15 Jul 1943–15 Nov 1946; VF-3A: 15 Nov 1946 – 7 Aug 1948; VF-31(2nd): 7 Aug 1948 – 1 Aug 2006; VFA-31: 1 Aug 2006–present	NAS Oceana	(Note: Second "Felix the Cat" squadron. The original "Felix the Cat" squadron existed from 23 September 1921 to 1 October 1945 and was designated Combat Squadron 4, VF-2(1st), VF-2B(1st), VF-6B(1st), VF-6(1st), VB-2B, VF-6B(2nd), VF-3(2nd) and finally VF-6(3rd) during the course of its existence. It created the insignia and nickname while it was designated Bombing Squadron 2B (VB-2B) in 1928. This squadron adopted the insignia when it was designated VF-3(3rd) on 15 July 1943)	*
VFA-32		Swordsmen	F/A-18F	CVW-3	STRKFIGHTWINGLANT	VBF-3: 1 Feb 1945 – 15 Nov 1946; VF-4A: 15 Nov 1946 – 7 Aug 1948; VF-32(2nd): 7 Aug 1948 – 1 Aug 2006; VFA-32: 1 Aug 2006–present	NAS Oceana		*
VFA-34		Blue Blasters	F/A-18E	CVW-3	STRKFIGHTWINGLANT	VA-34(3rd): 1 Jan 1970 – 30 Aug 1996; VFA-34: 30 Aug 1996–present	NAS Oceana		*
VFA-37		Ragin Bulls	F/A-18E	CVW-1	STRKFIGHTWINGLANT	VA-37: 1 Jul 1967 – 28 Nov 1990; VFA-37: 28 Nov 1990–present	NAS Oceana		*
VFA-41		Black Aces	F/A-18F	CVW-9	STRKFIGHTWINGPAC	VF-41(4th): 1 Sep 1950 – 1 Dec 2001; VFA-41: 1 Dec 2001–present	NAS Lemoore		*
VFA-81		Sunliners	F/A-18E	CVW-1	STRKFIGHTWINGLANT	VA-66(1st): 1 Jul 1955 – 1 Jul 1955; VF-81(4th): 1 Jul 1955 – 1 Jul 1959; VA-81: 1 Jul 1959 – 4 Feb 1988; VFA-81: 4 Feb 1988–present	NAS Oceana		*
VFA-83		Rampagers	F/A-18E	CVW-7	STRKFIGHTWINGLANT	VF-916: 1 Feb 1951 – 4 Feb 1953; VF-83(3rd): 4 Feb 1953 – 1 Jul 1955; VA-83: 1 Jul 1955 – 1 Mar 1988; VFA-83: 1 Mar 1988–present	NAS Oceana	(Note: USNR squadron VF-916 activated on 1 Feb 1951 for the Korean War)	*
VFA-86		Sidewinders	F-35C	CVW-11	JSFWING (Note: Joint Strike Fighter Wing)	VF-921: 1 Feb 1951 – 4 Feb 1953; VF-84(2nd): 4 Feb 1953 – 1 Jul 1955; VA-86(2nd): 1 Jul 1955–15 Jul 1987; VFA-86: 15 Jul 1987–present	NAS Lemoore	(Note: USNR squadron VF-921 activated on 1 Feb 1951 for the Korean War)	*
VFA-87		Golden Warriors	F/A-18E	CVW-8	STRKFIGHTWINGLANT	VA-87: 1 Feb 1968 – May 1986; VFA-87: May 1986 – present	NAS Oceana		*
VFA-94		Mighty Shrikes	F/A-18E	CVW-17	STRKFIGHTWINGPAC	VF-94(2nd): 26 Mar 1952 – 1 Aug 1958; VA-94(2nd): 1 Aug 1958–24 Jan 1991; VFA-94: 24 Jan 1991–present	NAS Lemoore		*
VFA-97		Warhawks	F-35C	CVW-2	JSFWING	VA-97: 1 Jun 1967 – 24 Jan 1991; VFA-97: 24 Jan 1991–present	NAS Lemoore		*
VFA-102		Diamondbacks	F/A-18F	CVW-5	STRKFIGHTWINGPAC	VA-36(2nd): 1 Jul 1955 – 1 Jul 1955; VF-102(2nd): 1 Jul 1955 – 1 May 2002; VFA-102: 1 May 2002 – present	MCAS Iwakuni		*
VFA-103		Jolly Rogers	F/A-18E, F/A-18F	CVW-7	STRKFIGHTWINGLANT	VF-103: 1 May 1952 – 27 Apr 2006; VFA-103: 27 Apr 2006–present	NAS Oceana	(Note: Third "Jolly Roger" squadron. The first "Jolly Roger" squadron existed from 1 January 1943 to 15 April 1959 and was designated VF-17, VF-5B(4th) and VF-61. The second existed from 1 July 1955 to 1 October 1995 and was designated VA-86(1st) and VF-84(3rd). It adopted the "Jolly Roger" name and insignia on 1 Apr 1960, a year after the original "Jolly Rogers" (VF-61) squadron was disestablished. This third squadron adopted the name and insignia in 1995 after the 1 October 1995 disestablishment of the second squadron (VF-84(3rd)). Prior to adopting the "Jolly Roger" name and insignia this squadron was VF-103 "Sluggers")	*
VFA-105		Gunslingers	F/A-18E	CVW-7	STRKFIGHTWINGLANT	VA-105(2nd): 4 Mar 1968 – 17 Dec 1990; VFA-105:17 Dec 1990–present	NAS Oceana		*
VFA-106		Gladiators	F/A-18E, F/A-18F		STRKFIGHTWINGLANT	VFA-106: 27 Apr 1984–present	NAS Oceana	FRS (Note: Adopted nickname and insignia of VA-106 which had been disestablished in 1969)	AD
VFA-113		Stingers	F/A-18E	CVW-2	STRKFIGHTWINGPAC	VF-113: 15 Jul 1948 – Mar 1959; VA-113: Mar 1956–25 Mar 1983; VFA-113: 25 Mar 1983–present	NAS Lemoore		*
VFA-115		Eagles	F-35C	CVW-17	JSFWING	VT-11: 10 Oct 1942 – 15 Nov 1946; VA-12A: 15 Nov 1946–15 Jul 1948; VA-115: 15 Jul 1948–30 Sep 1996; VFA-115: 30 Sep 1996–present	NAS Lemoore		*
VFA-122		Flying Eagles	F/A-18E, F/A-18F		STRKFIGHTWINGPAC	VFA-122: 1 Oct 1998–present	NAS Lemoore	FRS (Note: Adopted nickname and insignia of VA-122 which had been disestablished in 1991)	NJ
VFA-125		Rough Raiders	F-35C		JSFWING	VFA-125: 13 Nov 1980–present (inactive 1 Oct 2010 – 12 Jan 2017) (Note: Deactivated on 1 Oct 2010 as a Hornet FRS and reactivated as a F-35C FRS on 12 Jan 2017)	NAS Lemoore	FRS (Note: Adopted nickname and insignia of VA-125 which had been disestablished in 1977)	NJ
VFA-131		Wild Cats	F/A-18E	CVW-7	STRKFIGHTWINGLANT	VFA-131: 3 Oct 1983–present	NAS Oceana		*
VFA-136		Knighthawks	F/A-18E	CVW-3	STRKFIGHTWINGPAC	VFA-136: 1 Jul 1985–present	NAS Lemoore		*
VFA-137		Kestrels	F/A-18E	Pending	STRKFIGHTWINGPAC	VFA-137: 1 Jul 1985–present	NAS Lemoore		*
VFA-143		Pukin' Dogs	F/A-18E	CVW-3	STRKFIGHTWINGLANT	VF-871: 20 Jul 1950 – 4 Feb 1953; VF-123: 4 Feb 1953–12 Apr 1958; VF-53(3rd): 12 Apr 195-20 Jun 1962; VF-143(2nd): 20 Jun 1962–27 Apr 2006; VFA-143: 27 Apr 2006–present	NAS Oceana	(Note: USNR squadron VF-871 activated on 20 Jul 1950 for the Korean War)	*
VFA-146		Blue Diamonds	F/A-18E	CVW-17	STRKFIGHTWINGPAC	VA-146: 1 Feb 1956 – 21 Jul 1989; VFA-146: 21 Jul 1989–present	NAS Lemoore		*
VFA-147		Argonauts	F-35C	CVW-5	JSFWING	VA-147: 1 Feb 1967 – 20 Jul 1989; VFA-147: 20 Jul 1989–present	MCAS Iwakuni	(Note: First operational U.S. Navy F-35C squadron)	*
VFA-151		Vigilantes	F/A-18E (Note: Projected to begin F-35C transition in Spring 2027)	CVW-9	STRKFIGHTWINGPAC	VF-23(2nd): 6 Aug 1948 – 23 Feb 1959; VF-151(4th): 23 Feb 1959 – 1 Jun 1986; VFA-151: 1 Jun 1986–present	NAS Lemoore		*
VFA-154		Black Knights	F/A-18F	CVW-11	STRKFIGHTWINGPAC	VF-837: 1 Feb 1951 – 4 Feb 1953; VF-154: 4 Feb 1953 – 1 Oct 2003; VFA-154: 1 Oct 2003–present	NAS Lemoore	(Note: USNR VF-837 activated on 1 Feb 1951 for the Korean War)	*
VFA-192		Golden Dragons	F/A-18E	CVW-2	STRKFIGHTWINGPAC	VF-153(1st): 26 Mar 1945 – 15 Nov 1946; VF-15A: 15 Nov 1946–15 Jul 1948; VF-151(2nd): 15 Jul 1948–15 Feb 1950; VF-192(2nd): 15 Feb 1950–15 Mar 1956; VA-192: 15 Mar 1956–10 Jan 1985; VFA-192: 10 Jan 1985–present	NAS Lemoore		*
VFA-195		Dambusters	F/A-18E	CVW-5	STRKFIGHTWINGPAC	VT-19: 15 Aug 1943 – 15 Nov 1946; VA-20A: 15 Nov 1946–24 Aug 1948; VA-195: 24 Aug 1948 – 1 Apr 1985; VFA-195: 1 Apr 1985–present	MCAS Iwakuni		*
VFA-211		Checkmates	F/A-18E	CVW-11	STRKFIGHTWINGLANT	VB-74: 1 May 1945 – 15 Nov 1946; VA-1B: 15 Nov 1946 – 1 Sep 1948; VA-24: 1 Sep 1948 – 1 Dec 1949; VF-24(2nd): 1 Dec 1949 – 9 Mar 1959; VF-211(2nd): 9 Mar 1959 – 1 Aug 2006; VFA-211: 1 Aug 2006–present	NAS Oceana		*
VFA-213		Black Lions	F/A-18F	CVW-8	STRKFIGHTWINGLANT	VF-213: 22 Jun 1955 – 1 Aug 2006; VFA-213: 1 Aug 2006–present	NAS Oceana		*

*Carrier Air Wing (CVW) squadrons are marked with the tail code of their assigned CVW.
Naval Air Force Atlantic Fleet CVW tail codes begin with the letter "A": CVW-1 AB, CVW-3 AC, CVW-7 AG, CVW-8 AJ
Naval Air Force Pacific Fleet CVW tail codes begin with the letter "N": CVW-2 NE, CVW-5 NF, CVW-9 NG, CVW-11 NH, CVW-17 NA

=== Training (VT) (HT) squadrons ===
T-6B Texan II

T-45C Goshawk

T-54A Marlin II

TH-73A Thrashers

The VT designation was one of the original designations. It was established in 1921 to designate "Torpedo Plane Squadron". From 1922 to 1930 it designated "Torpedo & Bombing Squadron" and from 1930 to 1946 "Torpedo Squadron". In 1946 all remaining Torpedo Squadrons (Note: along with all remaining Bombing Squadrons (VB)) were redesignated "Attack Squadrons" (VA) and the VT designation was retired.

From 1927 to 1947 training squadrons were designated "VN". From 1947 to 1960 training units were not designated as squadrons, they were "units" or "groups" called Basic Training Groups (BTG), Advanced Training Units (ATU), Jet Transition Training Units (JTTU) or Multi Engine Training Groups (METG). On 1 May 1960 the VT designation was resurrected and existing flying training units and groups were designated "Training Squadrons (VT)".

The HT designation first appeared in May 1960 to designate Helicopter Training Squadron at the same time that the VT designation was resurrected to designate Training Squadron. In the early years of helicopter operations in the Navy, helicopter pilots were qualified fixed wing pilots who received transition training once they reported to a helicopter squadron. In 1950 a dedicated Helicopter Training Unit (HTU), later called a Helicopter Training Group (HTG), was established and in 1960 it became the first HT squadron. As the demand for helicopter pilots increased over the decades, additional HT squadrons were established and today approximately 60% of the Student Naval Aviators from all services (Navy, Marine Corps and Coast Guard) are winged as helicopter pilots.

There are two types of training squadrons: Primary training squadrons train students in the first stages of flight training leading to selection to one of six advanced training pipelines for student Naval Aviators (Rotary Wing, Tilt Rotor, Strike, Multi-Engine, E-6 or E-2), four advanced training pipelines for Student Naval flight officers (Airborne Early Warning TACAMO, Maritime Patrol & Reconnaissance, or Strike Fighter) or the single advanced pipeline for Navy Air Vehicle Pilots (AVP), Coast Guard Aerial Vehicle Pilots (AVP) and Marine Corps Unmanned Aircraft Systems Officers (UASO). (Note: A Navy Air Vehicle Pilot (AVP) is a U S Navy Warrant Officer qualified to operate the MQ-25A remotely piloted aircraft carrier based aircraft while USCG Aerial Vehicle Pilots (AVP) and USMC Unmanned Aircraft Systems Officers (UASO) are Commissioned Officers qualified to operate the MQ-9. USN AVPs, USCG AVPs and USMC UASOs wear the same wings.) The advanced training squadrons provide advanced flight instruction to U.S. Navy, U.S. Marine Corps, and U.S. Coast Guard Student Naval Aviators or to U.S. Navy Student Naval Flight Officers and student Air Vehicle Pilots, U.S. Coast Guard student Aerial Vehicle Pilots and U.S Marine Corps student Unmanned Aircraft Systems Officers as well as to international students from several allied nations. U.S. Navy, USMC and USCG students who successfully complete the program are awarded Naval Aviator, Naval Flight Officer or Air Vehicle Pilot (USN)/Aerial Vehicle Pilot (USCG)/Unmanned Aircraft Systems Officer (USMC) "Wings of Gold."

Training squadrons are organized differently than the Navy's operational squadrons as training squadrons do not have maintenance departments. Custody of training aircraft belongs to the TRAWING to which the squadrons are assigned and aircraft maintenance is conducted through contracted civilian maintenance. Training squadrons are composed of Operations, Safety and Administrative departments. The squadrons are staffed jointly by Navy, Marine Corps and Coast Guard instructors as a proportional share determined by the three services student throughput. Command of about a third of the squadrons is shared between the Navy and the Marine Corps alternating between a Navy and a Marine Corps Commanding Officer and one is shared between the Navy and the Coast Guard. Additionally, each of the seventeen training squadrons is augmented by a Squadron Augmentation Unit (SAU). (Note: Fleet Replacement Squadrons also have affiliated SAUs) A SAU is a Navy Reserve unit commanded by a Navy Reserve or Marine Corps Reserve Commanding Officer which consist of Navy Reserve and Marine Corps Reserve instructors. (Note: USCGR instructors are assigned to a Coast Guard Reserve unit such as Sector Mobile or Aviation Training Center Mobile for administrative and pay purposes but drill directly inside a Primary or Advanced VT or HT squadron as what the Coast Guard calls "Detached Duty External (DDE) Aviation Instructors.") These instructors are fully integrated into the training squadron's schedule and instruct Student Naval Aviators or Student Naval Flight Officers alongside their active duty counterparts. The SAUs are identified as "VT-3 SAU", VT-21 SAU", "HT-8 SAU" etc...

Navy training aircraft have been painted orange and white since 1959 (Note: The T-6A was an exception as when the USAF and Navy both adopted the Joint Primary Aircraft Training System (JPATS) T-6A aircraft, the USAF aircraft were to be delivered first with the Navy receiving their aircraft after the USAF. However beginning in 2002 while the USAF was still receiving its aircraft 40 T-6As were delivered to the Navy, they were delivered in the USAF blue and white color scheme and they were all assigned to NFO training at NAS Pensacola. After delivery of the USAF aircraft was completed, in 2009 the Navy's pilot training T-6Bs began delivery in the Navy's orange and white paint scheme and the 40 NFO T-6A trainers were eventually repainted in the Navy orange and white scheme) but in 2023 the decision was made to begin transitioning to a blue paint scheme for primary trainers (T-6A and T-6B) which is reminiscent of the Navy and Marine Corps WWII color scheme, and to grey paint schemes for advanced trainers (T-45C, T-54A and TH-73A) reflective of the color schemes of today's Navy and Marine Corps operational aircraft. The T-54As and remaining TH-73As still to be delivered will be delivered in the new grey paint schemes and the already delivered orange and white TH-73As and the T-45Cs, T-6As and T-6Bs will receive their new paint as they cycle through normal re-painting through the remainder of the decade.

Disestablished and deactivated VT squadrons can be found here: Disestablished or deactivated VT squadrons

Squadron designation	Insignia	Nickname	Aircraft	Functional Wing	Squadron lineage	Station	Notes	Tail code
VT-7		Eagles	T-45C	TRAWING; ONE	BTG-7: 1 Jun 1958 – 1 May 1960; VT-7: 1 May 1960 – present	NAS Meridian	Advanced Strike (Note: Graduates will fly-USN: F/A-18E, F/A-18F, EA-18G or F-35C; USMC: F/A-18C, F-35B or F-35C)	A
VT-9(2nd) (Note: Second training squadron use) (Note: There was an earlier training squadron designated VT-9 also called "Tigers" which existed from 15 Dec 1961 to Jul 1987)		Tigers	T-45C	TRAWING; ONE	VT-19: 2 Aug 1971 – 1 Oct 1998; VT-9(2nd): 1 Oct 1998–present	NAS Meridian	Advanced Strike	A
VT-21		Redhawks	T-45C	TRAWING; TWO	ATU-202: Apr 1951 – 1 May 1960; VT-21: 1 May 1960 – present	NAS Kingsville	Advanced Strike & Advanced E-2 (Note: Prospective E-2 pilots complete multi-engine training at TRAWING FOUR then carrier qualify in the T-45 to complete their training)	B
VT-22		Golden Eagles	T-45C	TRAWING; TWO	ATU-6: 13 Jun 1949–?? JTTU-1: ??–?? ATU-3: ??–?? ATU-212: ?? – 1 May 1960; VT-22: 1 May 1960–present	NAS Kingsville	Advanced Strike & Advanced E-2	B
VT-27		Boomers	T-6B	TRAWING; FOUR	ATU-B: 11 Jul 1951–?? ATU-402: ?? – 1 Jul 1960; VT-27: 1 Jul 1960–present	NAS Corpus Christi	Primary Training & Intermediate Strike	G
VT-28		Rangers	T-6B	TRAWING; FOUR	ATU-611: ?? – 1 May 1960; VT-28: 1 May 1960–present	NAS Corpus Christi	Primary Training & Intermediate Strike	G
VT-31		Wise Owls	T-44C; T-54A (Note: T-54A replacing T-44C from 2024 to 2027)	TRAWING; FOUR	ATU-601: Feb 1958 – 1 May 1960; VT-31: 1 May 1960 – present	NAS Corpus Christi	Intermediate E-2, (Note: prospective E-2 pilots complete multi-engine training then move to TRAWING TWO to carrier qualify in the T-45); Advanced Multi-Engine, (Note: Graduates will fly-USN: P-8A; USMC: KC-130J; USCG: HC-130J or HC-144B); Advanced E-6 (Note: Graduates will fly the E-6 (USN only)) & Advanced Tilt Rotor (Note: Graduates will fly-USN: CMV-22B; USMC: MV-22B)	G
VT-35		Stingrays	T-44C; T-54A	TRAWING; FOUR	VT-35: 29 Oct 1999–present	NAS Corpus Christi	Intermediate E-2, Advanced Multi-Engine, Advanced E-6 & Advanced Tilt Rotor	G
VT-2		Doerbirds	T-6B	TRAWING; FIVE	BTG-2: ?? – 1 May 1960; VT-2: 1 May 1960–present	NAS Whiting Field	Primary Training & Intermediate Strike	E
VT-3		Red Knights	T-6B	TRAWING; FIVE	BTG-3: ?? – 1 May 1960; VT-3: 1 May 1960–present	NAS Whiting Field	Primary Training & Intermediate Strike	E
VT-6		Shooters	T-6B	TRAWING; FIVE	METG: 1 Jul 1956 – 1 May 1960; VT-6: 1 May 1960 – present	NAS Whiting Field	Primary Training & Intermediate Strike	E
HT-8		Eightballers	TH-73A	TRAWING; FIVE	HTU-1: 3 Dec 1950 – Mar 1957; HTG-1: Mar 1957 – 1 Jul 1960; HT-8: 1 Jul 1960–present	NAS Whiting Field	Intermediate Tilt Rotor, (Note: Prospective MV-22 (USMC) and CMV-22 (USN) pilots learn tactical low altitude flight and how to hover then move to TRAWING FOUR to complete advanced training in the T-54) & Advanced Rotary Wing (Note: Graduates will fly-USN: MH-60R or MH-60S; USMC: AH-1Z, UH-1Y, CH-53E or CH-53K; USCG: MH-60T or MH-65E)	E
HT-18		Vigilant Eagles	TH-73A	TRAWING; FIVE	HT-18: 1 Mar 1972–present	NAS Whiting Field	Intermediate Tilt Rotor, & Advanced Rotary Wing	E
HT-28		Hellions	TH-73A	TRAWING; FIVE	HT-28: 1 Nov 2006–present	NAS Whiting Field	Intermediate Tilt Rotor, & Advanced Rotary Wing	E
VT-10		Wildcats	T-6A	TRAWING; SIX	BNAO: (Note: BNAO: Basic Naval Aviation Officer's school) Jun 1960 – 15 Jan 1968; VT-10: 15 Jan 1968–present	NAS Pensacola	NFO: Primary (Note: and Intermediate Strike Fighter for those selected to progress into the Strike Fighter pipeline); AVP/UASO: Primary (Note: utilizing T-6 simulators only)	F
VT-86		Sabrehawks	T-45C	TRAWING; SIX	VT-86: 5 Jun 1972–present	NAS Pensacola	NFO: Adv Strike Fighter (Note: Graduates will fly-USN: F/A-18F or EA-18G); AVP/UASO: Advanced (Note: Training uses simulators only. Graduates will fly-USN: MQ-25A; USCG & USMC: MQ-9)	F
VT-4		Warbucks	Multi-Crew Simulator	TRAWING; SIX	BTG-9: ?? – 1 May 1960: VT-4: 1 May 1960–present (inactive Dec 2010 – Jun 2013) (Note: Deactivated in Dec 2010 as an NFO primary training squadron and reactivated as an NFO advanced training squadron in Jun 2013)	NAS Pensacola	NFO Advanced AEW, TACAMO & MPR (Note: Graduates will fly-USN: E-2D, E-6B or P-8A)	(Note: VT-4 has operated only simulators since 2013. As a squadron of Training Air Wing SIX it previously flew aircraft with tail code F)

=== Unmanned Carrier-Launched Multi-Role (VUQ) squadrons (aerial refueling squadrons) ===
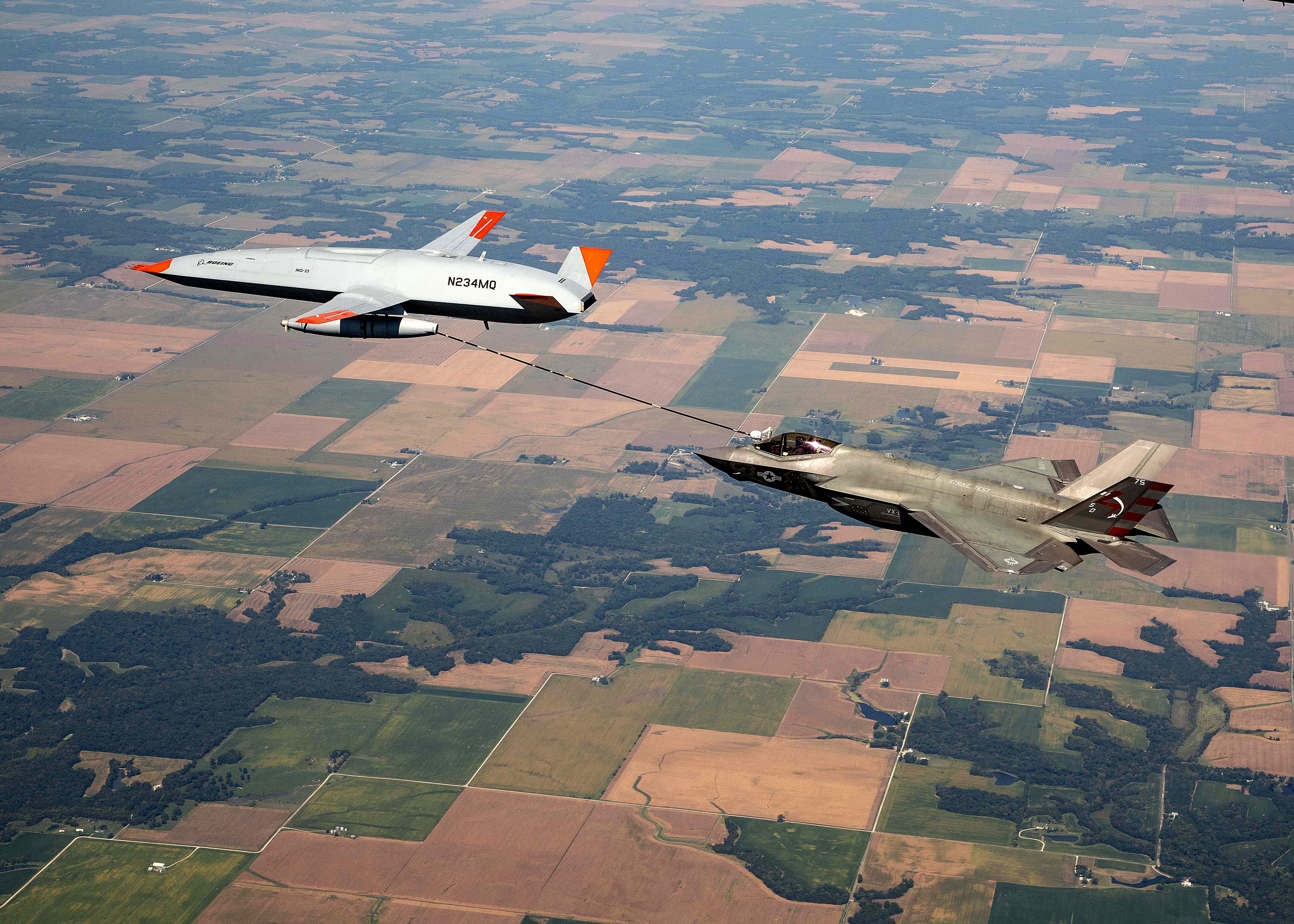
An MQ-25 Stingray prototype refuels an F-35C Lightning II

The Navy's first VUQ squadron (VUQ-10) was established in 2022 aboard NAS Patuxent River. VUQ squadrons are primarily aerial refueling squadrons. VUQ-10 currently remains based at NAS Patuxent River engaged with VX-23, UX-24 and VX-1 to test, train and develop operational and maintenance procedures for the MQ-25 Stingray. It will ultimately move to NBVC Pt. Mugu as the MQ-25 Fleet Replacement Squadron. The first of two operational squadrons (VUQ-11) was established on 1 April 2026 at NAS Patuxent River. That squadron will relocate to NBVC Point Mugu by the end of the decade and a second operational squadron (VUQ-12) will be established at NS Norfolk by the end of the decade. All three squadrons will fall under Airborne Command & Control and Logistics Wing, the same wing to which the airborne command and control (VAW) squadrons belong. VUQ-11 and VUQ-12 will attach detachments of five MQ-25 Stingrays to deploying VAW squadrons.

Initially, the MQ-25's primary role will be to conduct mission tanking; extending the carrier air wing's strike range by aerial refueling air wing aircraft at ranges from the carrier and at fuel off-load quantities that were previously unachievable. The MQ-25 will increase the overall lethality of the CVW by relieving the F/A-18E Super Hornet in the aerial refueling role enabling ordnance to replace refueling stores on the F/A-18's pylons. In secondary roles, the MQ-25 will conduct recovery tanking and it is equipped with an intelligence, surveillance and reconnaissance (ISR) capability.

Squadron designation	Insignia	Nickname	Aircraft	Type Wing	Squadron lineage	Station	Notes
VUQ-10		Pathfinders	MQ-25A	ACCLOGWING (Note: Airborne Command & Control and Logistics Wing)	VUQ-10: 1 Oct 2022–present	NAS Patuxent River (Note: to relocate to NBVC Point Mugu)	FRS
VUQ-11		Manta Wraiths	MQ-25A	ACCLOGWING	VUQ-11: 1 Apr 2026–present	NAS Patuxent River	

=== Unmanned Patrol (VUP) squadrons ===
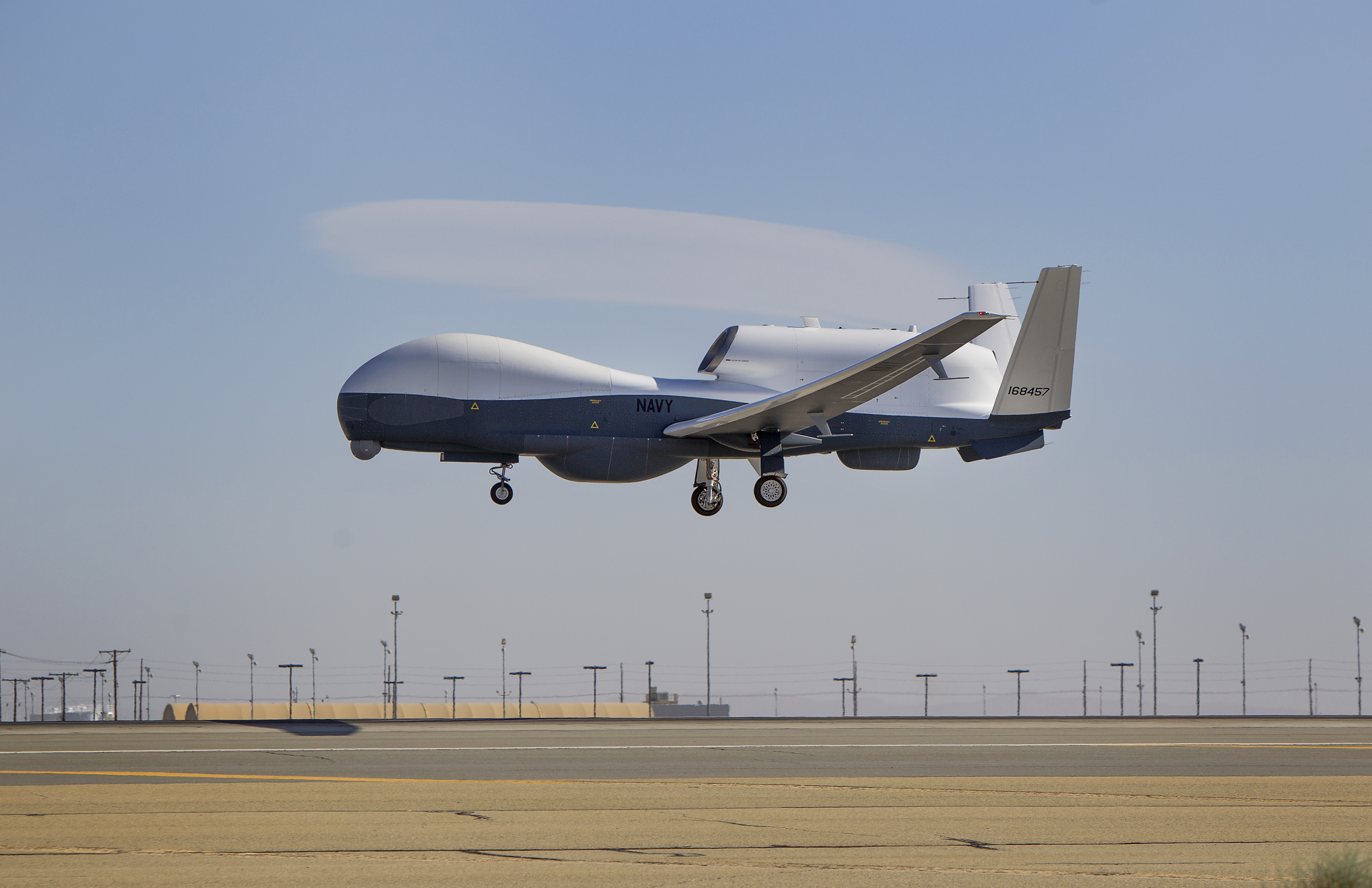
An MQ-4C Triton

In 2016 the first Unmanned Patrol (VUP) squadron was established and designated VUP-19. In contrast to the manned aircraft Patrol (VP) squadrons which are maritime patrol squadrons, VUP squadrons are functional successors to the former Fleet Air Reconnaissance (VQ) squadrons with the primary roles of airborne reconnaissance, surveillance and intelligence collection. VUP-19 operates the MQ-4C Triton unmanned air vehicle from an operations center located at NAS Jacksonville while its aircraft and aircraft maintenance personnel are based at Naval Station Mayport. A second VUP squadron was established at NAS Whidbey Island in October 2024 and is undergoing a multi-year stand up process which is planned to be complete by the end of the decade and will include aircraft based at NBVC Pt. Mugu.

VUP squadrons do not deploy, the Atlantic Fleet's squadron is based at Naval Air Station Jacksonville, FL and the Pacific Fleet's at Naval Air Station Whidbey Island, WA. Though the squadrons themselves do not deploy, each squadron is capable of deploying detachments of aircraft and maintenance personnel to forward operating locations. VP-30 based at NAS Jacksonville serves as the single Fleet Replacement Squadron for both the P-8A and the MQ-4C.

Squadron designation	Insignia	Nickname	Aircraft	Functional Wing	Squadron lineage	Station	Notes	Tail Code
VUP-11		Dark Horses	MQ-4C	PATRECONWING TEN	VUP-11: 1 Oct 2024–present (Note: From VUP-11 official command website as of June 2025: "Officially established on October 1, 2024, VUP-11 is undergoing rapid growth as it progresses through a multi-year standup period. A formal establishment ceremony is scheduled for late 2025, followed by commencement of initial flight operations. The squadron is on track to assume full flight operations at NAS Whidbey Island by 2027 and full maintenance operations at NBVC Point Mugu by 2029.")	C2 at NAS Whidbey Island, (Note: initial flight operations in 2026, full flight operations by 2027) aircraft at NBVC Pt. Mugu (Note: by 2029)	(Note: Adopted the insignia of a former squadron VP-11 "Proud Pegasus" which was disestablished in 1997)	LE
VUP-19		Big Red	MQ-4C	PATRECONWING ELEVEN	VUP-19: 1 Oct 2016-present	C2 at NAS Jacksonville, aircraft at NS Mayport	(Note: Command & Control at NAS Jacksonville with aircraft based at Naval Station Mayport and a detachment of aircraft at NBVC Pt. Mugu pending VUP-11 reaching full operational capability) (Note: Adopted the nickname and insignia of a former squadron designated VP-19 which was disestablished in 1991)	PE

== Other aircraft units ==
The units in the tables below do not carry a squadron designation (VFA, VP, HSC etc...) and except for the Navy Flight Demonstration Squadron are not called squadrons, however; they have custody of and/or routinely fly Navy aircraft as their primary function.

=== Blue Angels and Naval Test Pilot School ===
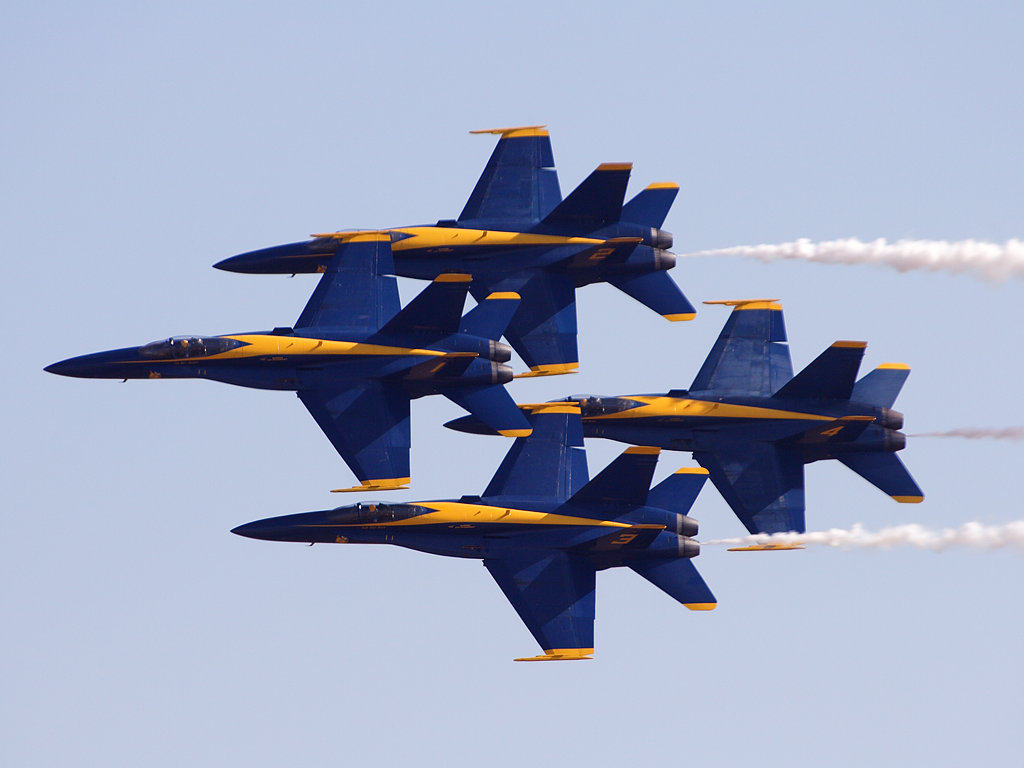
The Blue Angels "diamond"

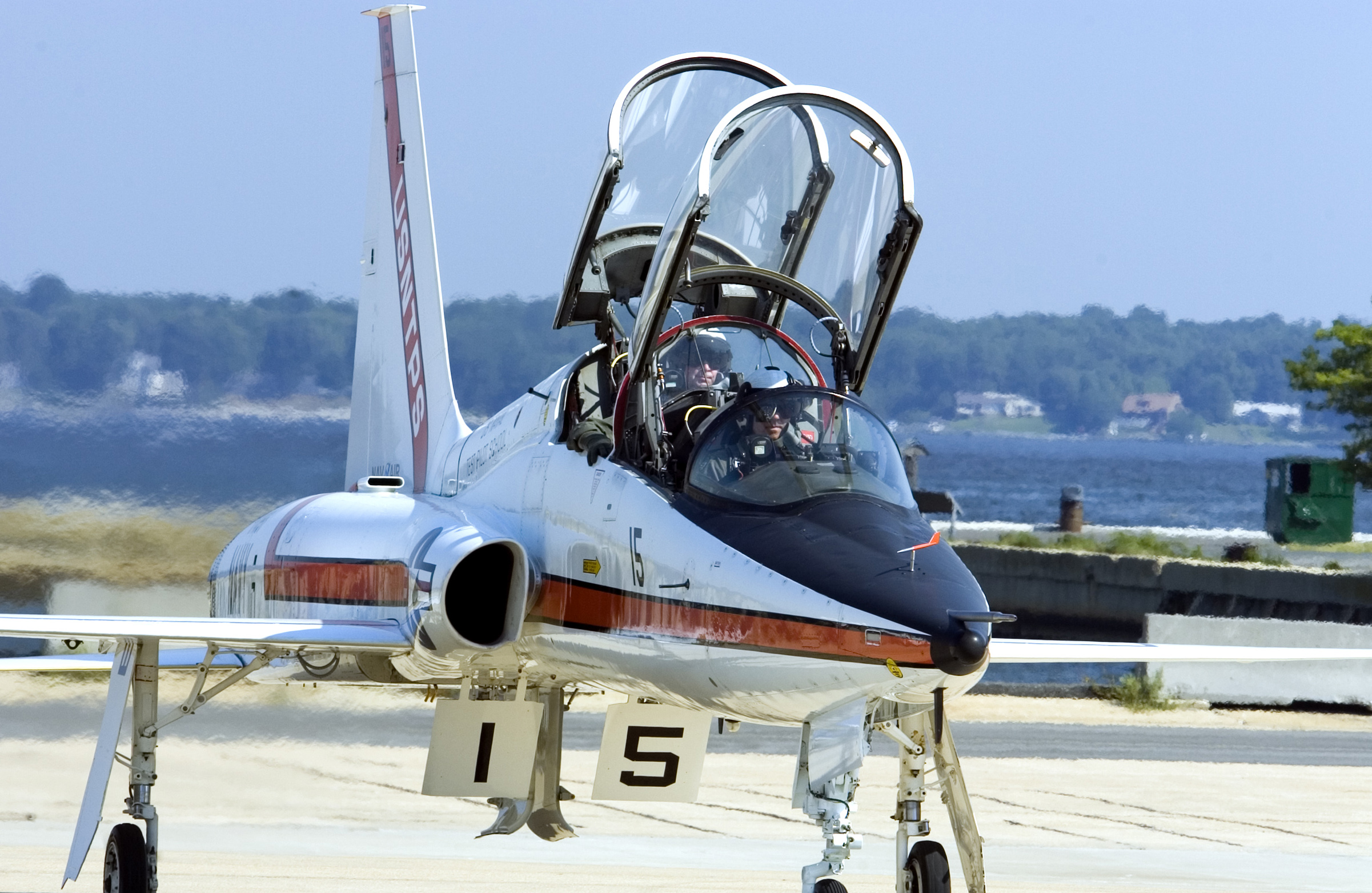
USNTPS T-38

The U.S. Navy Flight Demonstration Squadron ("Blue Angels") is made up of U.S. Navy and U.S. Marine Corps Naval Aviators and of other U.S. Navy and U.S. Marine Corps officers and enlisted sailors and Marines who maintain the squadron's aircraft and carry out all support and administrative functions of the squadron. The Blue Angels were formed on 24 April 1946 as the "Navy Flight Exhibition Team" under the leadership of a "team leader". It was not until 10 December 1973 that the unit was formally established as a squadron under the command of a Commanding Officer.

The U.S. Naval Test Pilot School operates various fixed wing and rotary wing aircraft to train and graduate U.S. Navy and U.S. Marine Corps experimental test pilots, flight test engineers, and flight test flight officers. It is also the primary test pilot school for U.S. Army aviators.

Unit name	Insignia	Nickname	Aircraft	Wing	Station	Tail Code
U.S. Navy Flight Demonstration Squadron (NFDS)		Blue Angels	F/A-18E; F/A-18F; C-130J	Not assigned to a wing, reports directly to the Commander, Naval Air Training Command (CNATRA).	Based at NAS Pensacola. Winter training site NAF El Centro	(Note: The assigned NFDS tail code is "BA" but it is not displayed on the squadron's aircraft. The demonstration aircraft display their "number" (1, 2, 3 etc...) and the logistics support C-130 "Fat Albert" displays the squadron insignia on its tail in lieu of a tail code)
U.S. Naval Test Pilot School (USNTPS)		TPS	Various fixed and rotary wing aircraft	Naval Test Wing Atlantic	NAS Patuxent River	USNTPS

=== Weapons Schools ===
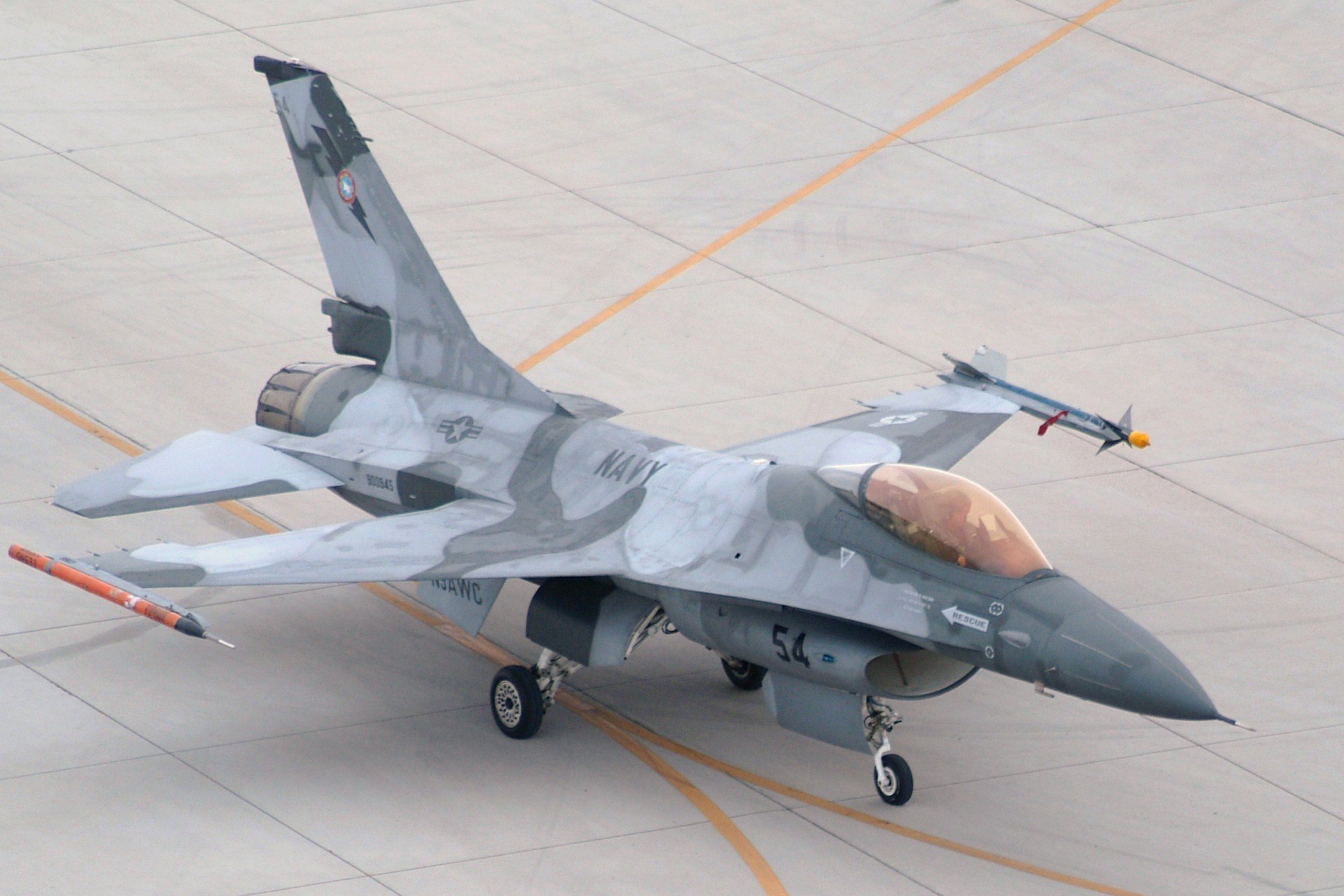
A "Top Gun" F-16A

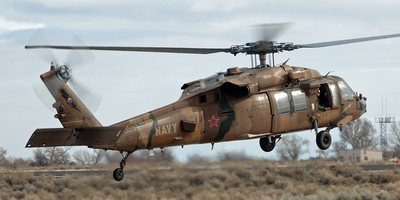
A "Seawolf" MH-60S Seahawk

There are five Naval Aviation Warfighting Development Center (NAWDC) weapons schools. These weapons schools train selected U.S. Navy Naval Aviators, (Note: some USMC F-35C Naval Aviators attend Top Gun as well) Naval Flight Officers (NFO) and Naval Aircrewmen who have completed their initial fleet squadron tours, in instructional techniques and in advanced tactics in their respective aircraft qualifying them as weapons and tactics instructors. TOPGUN produces "Strike Fighter Tactics Instructors" (SFTI), TOPDOME produces "Hawkeye Weapons & Tactics Instructors" (HEWTI), HAVOC produces "Growler Tactics Instructors" (GTI) and SEAWOLF and SEAHUNTER produce "Seahawk Weapons & Tactics Instructors" (SWTI). These graduates then serve either at the Naval Aviation Warfighting Development Center (NAWDC) or are assigned to their respective wing weapons school after which they will serve a follow on tour in a deployable Fleet Squadron as the squadron's Training Officer.

Unit name	Insignia	Nickname	Aircraft	Wing	Station	Tail Code
Navy Fighter Weapons School (Top Gun)		TOPGUN	F-16A, B, C, D F/A-18E, F F-35C (Note: Custody of the aircraft is held by the Maintenance Department of the Naval Aviation Warfighting Development Center)	The Naval Aviation Warfighting Development Center (NAWDC) weapons schools are not squadrons, neither are they assigned to a wing; they are departments of the Naval Aviation Warfighting Development Center	NAS Fallon	(Note: NAWDC weapons school aircraft display the specific school insignia superimposed over a lightning bolt in lieu of a tail code)
Carrier Airborne Early Warning Weapons School (CAEWWS)		TOPDOME	E-2D	The Naval Aviation Warfighting Development Center (NAWDC) weapons schools are not squadrons, neither are they assigned to a wing; they are departments of the Naval Aviation Warfighting Development Center	NAS Fallon	(Note: NAWDC weapons school aircraft display the specific school insignia superimposed over a lightning bolt in lieu of a tail code)
Airborne Electronic Attack Weapons School (Havoc)		HAVOC	EA-18G	The Naval Aviation Warfighting Development Center (NAWDC) weapons schools are not squadrons, neither are they assigned to a wing; they are departments of the Naval Aviation Warfighting Development Center	NAS Fallon	(Note: NAWDC weapons school aircraft display the specific school insignia superimposed over a lightning bolt in lieu of a tail code)
Navy Rotary Wing Weapons School (Seawolf)		SEAWOLF	MH-60S	The Naval Aviation Warfighting Development Center (NAWDC) weapons schools are not squadrons, neither are they assigned to a wing; they are departments of the Naval Aviation Warfighting Development Center	NAS Fallon	(Note: NAWDC weapons school aircraft display the specific school insignia superimposed over a lightning bolt in lieu of a tail code)
Navy Rotary Wing Weapons School (Seahunter)		SEAHUNTER	MH-60R	The Naval Aviation Warfighting Development Center (NAWDC) weapons schools are not squadrons, neither are they assigned to a wing; they are departments of the Naval Aviation Warfighting Development Center	NAS Fallon	(Note: NAWDC weapons school aircraft display the specific school insignia superimposed over a lightning bolt in lieu of a tail code)

There are eight wing weapons schools, each reporting to their respective type wing. Wing weapons schools are the lead organizations for the development and refinement of tactics and they provide advanced training for their wing's squadrons utilizing squadron aircraft.

Unit name	Insignia	Nickname	Aircraft	Wing	Station	Tail Code
Strike Fighter Weapons School Atlantic		Mauler	(Note: The wing weapons school does not have custody of any aircraft, its SFTIs (Strike Fighter Tactics Instructors) conduct advanced training of the wing's F/A-18E and F/A-18F Strike Fighter squadrons.)	Strike Fighter Wing Atlantic	NAS Oceana	(Note: No tail codes, the wing weapons schools do not have custody of any aircraft. They train utilizing the aircraft of the fleet squadron receiving the training)
Strike Fighter Weapons School Pacific		Outlaws	(Note: The wing weapons school does not have custody of any aircraft, its SFTIs (Strike Fighter Tactics Instructors) conduct advanced training of the wing's F/A-18E and F/A-18F Strkie Fighter squadrons and of Joint Strike Fighter Wing's F-35C Strike Fighter squadrons.)	Strike Fighter Wing Pacific	NAS Lemoore	(Note: No tail codes, the wing weapons schools do not have custody of any aircraft. They train utilizing the aircraft of the fleet squadron receiving the training)
Electronic Attack Weapons School			(Note: The wing weapons school does not have custody of any aircraft, its GTIs (Growler Tactics Instructors) conduct advanced training of the wing's EA-18G Electronic Attack squadrons.)	Electronic Attack Wing Pacific	NAS Whidbey Island	(Note: No tail codes, the wing weapons schools do not have custody of any aircraft. They train utilizing the aircraft of the fleet squadron receiving the training)
Airborne Command & Control and Logistics Weapons School			(Note: The wing weapons school does not have custody of any aircraft, its HEWTIs (Hawkeye Weapons & Tactics Instructors) conduct advanced training of the wing's E-2D Airborne Command and Control squadrons)	Airborne Command & Control and Logistics Wing	NS Norfolk (Note: with a detachment at NBVC, Point Mugu)	(Note: No tail codes, the wing weapons schools do not have custody of any aircraft. They train utilizing the aircraft of the fleet squadron receiving the training)
Helicopter Sea Combat Weapons School Atlantic		Savage	(Note: The wing weapons school does not have custody of any aircraft, its SWTIs (Seahawk Weapons & Tactics Instructors) conduct advanced training of the wing's MH-60S Helicopter Sea Combat squadrons.)	Helicopter Sea Combat Wing Atlantic	NS Norfolk	(Note: No tail codes, the wing weapons schools do not have custody of any aircraft. They train utilizing the aircraft of the fleet squadron receiving the training)
Helicopter Sea Combat Weapons School Pacific		Phoenix		Helicopter Sea Combat Wing Pacific	NAS North Island	(Note: No tail codes, the wing weapons schools do not have custody of any aircraft. They train utilizing the aircraft of the fleet squadron receiving the training)
Helicopter Maritime Strike Weapons School Atlantic		Talons	(Note: The wing weapons school does not have custody of any aircraft, its SWTIs (Seahawk Weapons & Tactics Instructors) conduct advanced training of the wing's MH-60R Helicopter Maritime Strike squadrons.)	Helicopter Maritime Strike Wing Atlantic	NS Mayport	(Note: No tail codes, the wing weapons schools do not have custody of any aircraft. They train utilizing the aircraft of the fleet squadron receiving the training)
Helicopter Maritime Strike Weapons School Pacific		Honey Badgers		Helicopter Maritime Strike Wing Pacific	NAS North Island	(Note: No tail codes, the wing weapons schools do not have custody of any aircraft. They train utilizing the aircraft of the fleet squadron receiving the training)

The Maritime Patrol and Reconnaissance Weapons School is functionally equivalent to the five NAWDC weapons schools but it is a subordinate unit of Commander, Patrol and Reconnaissance Group and is based at NAS Jacksonville, FL. It trains Maritime Weapons and Tactics Instructors (MWTI) who are then assigned to Weapons Training Units embedded in the training departments of Patrol and Reconnaissance Wings TEN and ELEVEN with follow on tours as deployable squadron Training Officers. The Weapons Training Units function for Patrol and Reconnaissance Wings TEN and ELEVEN as the eight wing weapons schools function for their wings.

Unit name	Insignia	Nickname	Aircraft	Wing	Station	Tail Code
Maritime Patrol and Reconnaissance Weapons School (MPRWS)		Sentinels	(Note: The weapons school does not have custody of any aircraft, it uses aircraft of the squadrons of PATRECONWING ELEVEN to train and qualify MWTIs (Maritime Weapons and Tactics Instructors). MWTIs serve in the training departments of PATRECONWING TEN and PATRECONWING ELEVEN conducting advanced training of P-8A Patrol Squadrons and MQ-4C Unmanned Patrol squadrons.)	Not assigned to a wing, reports directly to Commander, Patrol and Reconnaissance Group	NAS Jacksonville	(Note: No tail code, the weapons school does not have custody of any aircraft. It utilizies the aircraft of PATRECONWING TEN to train MWTIs who then provide advanced training to the squadrons of PATRECONWINGs TEN and ELEVEN using aircraft of the squadrons receiving the training)

The TACAMO Weapons School is the functional equivalent of both the five NAWDC weapons schools and of the eight wing weapons schools as it trains its Weapons and Tactics Instructors (WTI)s in house and it then uses those WTIs to provide advanced training to the squadrons of Strategic Communications Wing ONE or provides them to the squadrons as squadron Training Officers. It is based at Tinker AFB and is a subordinate unit of the wing reporting directly to the Commander, Strategic Communications Wing ONE.

Unit name	Insignia	Nickname	Aircraft	Wing	Station	Tail Code
TACAMO Weapons School (TWS)			(Note: The weapons school does not have custody of any aircraft, it uses aircraft of the squadrons of STRATCOMWING ONE to train and qualify its WTIs and then to provide advanced training to the E-6B aircrews of the wing's squadrons)	Strategic Communications Wing ONE	Tinker AFB	(Note: No tail code, the weapons school does not have custody of any aircraft. It uses the aircraft of STRATCOMWING ONE's squadrons to train its WTIs who then provide advanced training to the squadrons of the wing using the aircraft of those squadrons)

=== Shore Installation operated aircraft units ===
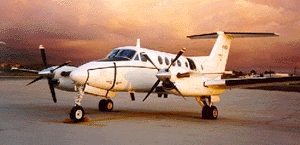
A USN C-12F

Navy installations which operate an airfield do so through the installation's "Air Operations Department" which until the second decade of the 21st century usually included light transport aircraft which were flown by Naval Aviators assigned to various leadership positions within the command structure of the installation. These aircraft provided passenger transportation and light logistics support to the Navy Air Logistics Office (NALO) supplementing the Navy Reserve's VR squadrons. By 2011 in a cost cutting measure these aircraft had been withdrawn from all but one Naval Air Station in the U.S. and seven overseas locations. Today these eight installations operate UC-12F, UC-12M or C-26D aircraft in executive or high priority passenger transport and theater logistics support roles. Additionally, the Pacific Missile Range Facility at Barking Sands, Hawaii operates EC-26D and RC-26D range support aircraft in support of activities at the missile range.

Unit name	Insignia	Nickname	Aircraft	Wing	Station	Tail Code
Naval Air Station Pax River Flight Support Division (Note: A division of the Air Operations Department)			UC-12M	Not assigned to a wing, an Air Operations Department is a component of the installation's command structure	NAS Patuxent River	7A (Note: Station tail codes are no longer displayed on station aircraft, instead a small American flag and the last three, or full six digits, of the aircraft's Bureau Number are displayed in lieu of the tail code on UC-12 aircraft)
Naval Station Guantanamo Bay Air Ops Dept.			UC-12M	Not assigned to a wing, an Air Operations Department is a component of the installation's command structure	NS Guantanamo Bay	8F
Naval Support Activity Bahrain Air Ops Dept.			UC-12M	Not assigned to a wing, an Air Operations Department is a component of the installation's command structure	NSA Bahrain (Note: NSA Bahrain's aircraft are based at the Bahrain International Airport)	8K
Naval Air Facility Atsugi Air Ops Dept.			UC-12F	Not assigned to a wing, an Air Operations Department is a component of the installation's command structure	NAF Atsugi	8A
Naval Air Facility Misawa Air Ops Dept.			UC-12F	Not assigned to a wing, an Air Operations Department is a component of the installation's command structure	NAF Misawa (Note: NAF Misawa is a tenant command located aboard Misawa Air Base)	8M
Fleet Activities Okinawa Air Ops Dept.			UC-12F	Not assigned to a wing, an Air Operations Department is a component of the installation's command structure	Kadena AB (Note: Fleet Activities Okinawa Headquarters and aircraft are located aboard Kadena Air Base)	8H
Naval Air Station Sigonella Air Ops Dept.			C-26D	Not assigned to a wing, an Air Operations Department is a component of the installation's command structure	NAS Sigonella	8C (Note: Station tail codes are no longer displayed on station aircraft, instead a small American flag and the aircraft's Bureau Number are displayed in lieu of the tail code on C-26 aircraft)
Naval Support Activity Naples Air Ops Dept.			C-26D	Not assigned to a wing, an Air Operations Department is a component of the installation's command structure	NSA Naples (Note: NSA Naples is adjacent to and utilizes the runways of Naples International Airport)	8B
Pacific Missile Range Facility Barking Sands Air Ops Dept.			RC-26D; EC-26D	Not assigned to a wing, an Air Operations Department is a component of the installation's command structure	PMRF Barking Sands	(Note: PMRF is not assigned a station tail code. The station's aircraft display a small American flag and the aircraft's Bureau Number on the tail)

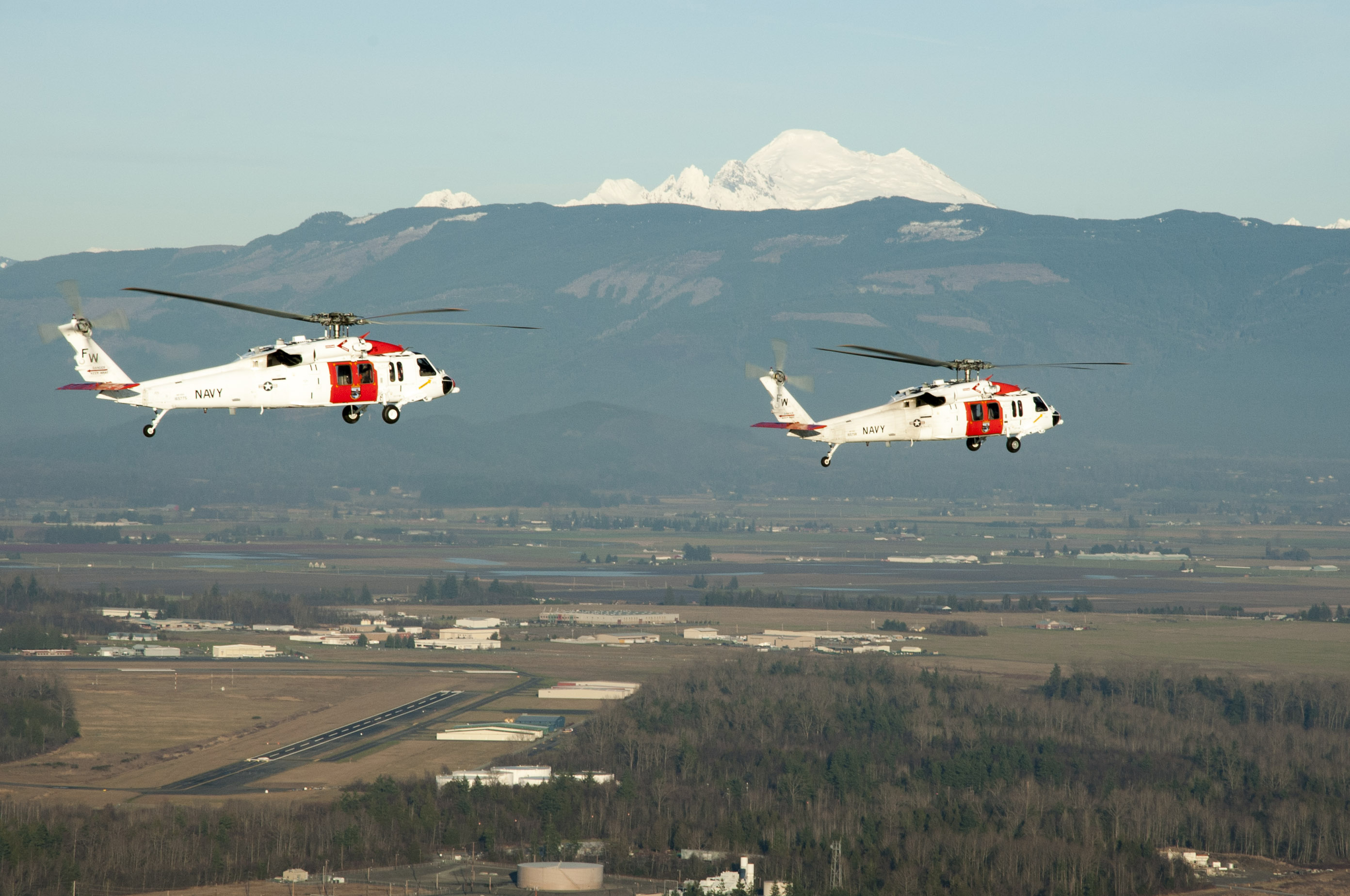
MH-60S "SAR" Seahawks

There are six Naval Air Stations which maintain a Search and Rescue (SAR) alert posture in support of the aviation activities at those air stations. As a secondary function those station SAR units are available to support local civilian authorities on a not to interfere with their primary mission basis. Those stations are NAS Key West, NAS Patuxent River, NAS Lemoore, NAS Whidbey Island, NAS Fallon and NAWS China Lake. SAR is covered at NAS Fallon by the Navy Rotary Wing Weapons School as a collateral responsibility (Note: Prior to 2022 there was a dedicated SAR unit called the "Long Horns" which was under the command of the Commanding Officer of NAS Fallon as a division of the air station's Air Operations Department but in 2022 that unit was disbanded and SAR responsibility was assumed by the Rotary Wing Weapons School) and at NAWS China Lake by VX-31 as a collateral responsibility but the other four air stations have dedicated SAR units of three to four MH-60S helicopters. Until October 2024 all four of those units were divisions of the Air Operations Departments of the respective Naval Air Station but in October 2024 three of those units were removed from the administrative command of their Naval Air Stations and were established as separate units under the administrative command of Helicopter Sea Combat Wing Atlantic or Pacific. The unit at NAS Patuxent River remains the only SAR unit under the administrative command of the Naval Air Station at which it is based. The SAR helicopters are painted in a high visibility red and white paint scheme.

Unit name	Insignia	Nickname	Aircraft	Wing	Station	Tail Code
Station SAR Key West		Marlins	MH-60S	Helicopter Sea Combat Wing Atlantic	NAS Key West	7Q
Station SAR Lemoore		Wranglers	MH-60S	Helicopter Sea Combat Wing Pacific	NAS Lemoore	7S
Station SAR Whidbey		Firewood	MH-60S	Helicopter Sea Combat Wing Pacific	NAS Whidbey Island	FW (Note: 7G is the tail code assigned to NAS Whidbey Island for aircraft under the station's control but it is not displayed on the station's SAR helicopters, instead FW (Fire Wood) is painted on the helicopters)
Naval Air Station Pax River SAR Division		SAR Dogs	MH-60S	Not assigned to a wing, SAR is a division of the Air Ops Department which is a component of the Naval Air Station	NAS Patuxent River	7A (Note: the assigned station tail code is not displayed on the station's SAR helicopters)

== See also ==
- List of United States Navy aircraft wings
- Naval aviation
- List of inactive United States Navy aircraft squadrons
- Modern US Navy carrier air operations
- List of United States Navy aircraft designations (pre-1962)
- List of US Naval aircraft
- List of United States Navy airfields
- United States Naval Aviator
- Naval Flight Officer
- United States Marine Corps Aviation
- NATOPS
- List of active United States Marine Corps aircraft squadrons
- List of active United States Air Force aircraft squadrons
- VBF
