= VAQ-209 =

Electronic Attack Squadron 209
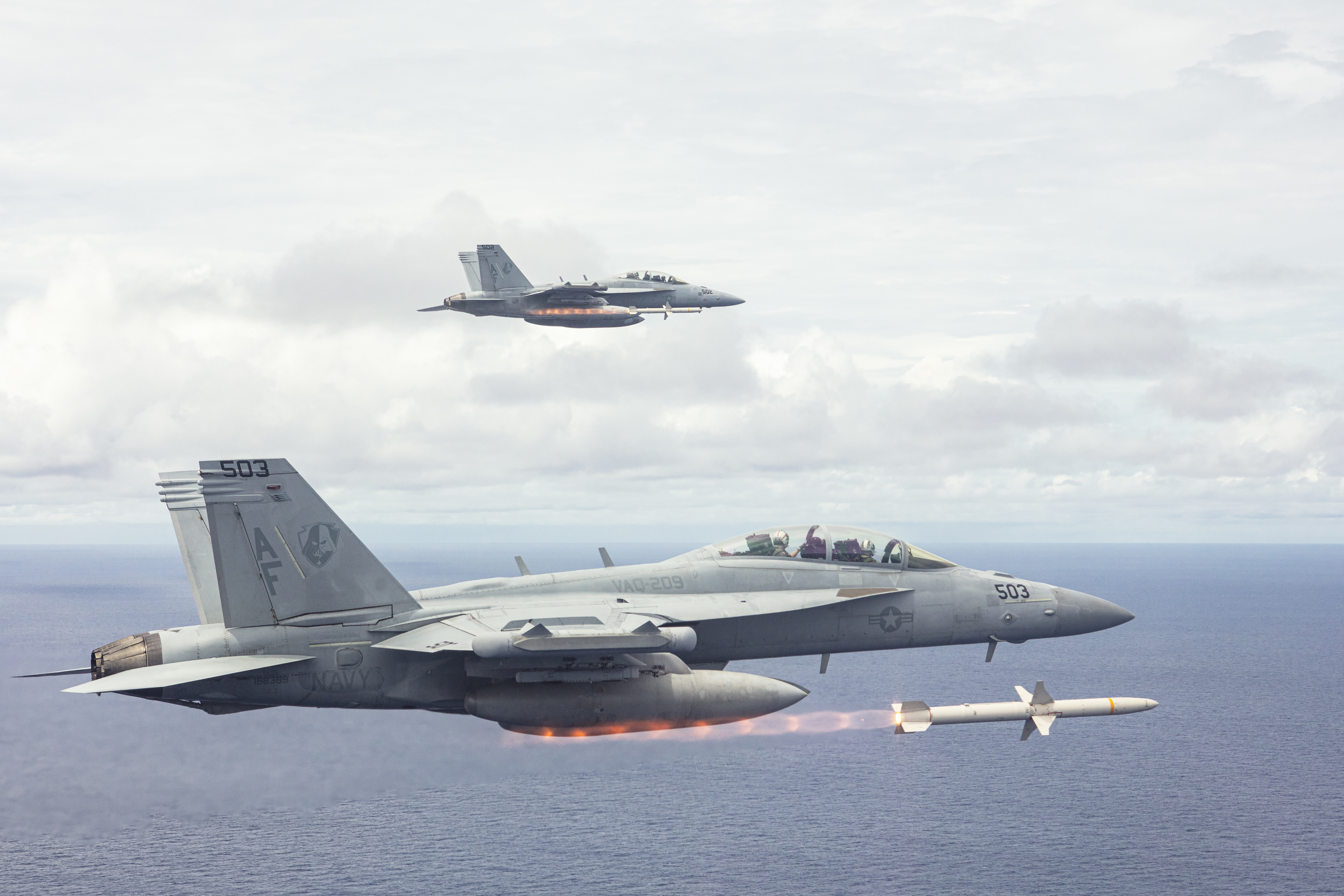
- VAQ-209 EA-18G Growlers firing AGM-88 HARM missiles over the Pacific Ocean in 2022
- Active: 1 October 1977 – present
- Country: United States
- Branch: United States Navy
- Role: Airborne Electromagnetic Attack
- Part of: United States Navy Reserve: Naval Air Force Reserve; Tactical Support Wing
- Garrison/HQ: NAS Whidbey Island
- Nickname(s): Star Warriors
- Motto(s): Fortuna Fortes Juvat (Latin: "Fortune favors the strong"
- Colors: Green and Gold
- Mascot(s): Darth Vader

Insignia
- VAQ-209 insignia

Aircraft flown
- Attack: EA-6A Electric Intruder; EA-6B Prowler; EA-18G Growler

Electronic Attack Squadron 209 (VAQ-209) is a United States Navy Reserve electromagnetic attack squadron. Known as the "Star Warriors", the squadron flies the EA-18G Growler carrier-based electronic warfare jet aircraft. It is assigned to the Tactical Support Wing and based at Naval Air Station Whidbey Island, Washington. Its mission is: "To safely train to attain and maintain mobilization readiness for immediate employment in event of war or national emergency." The squadron's radio callsign is "Vader".

== History ==
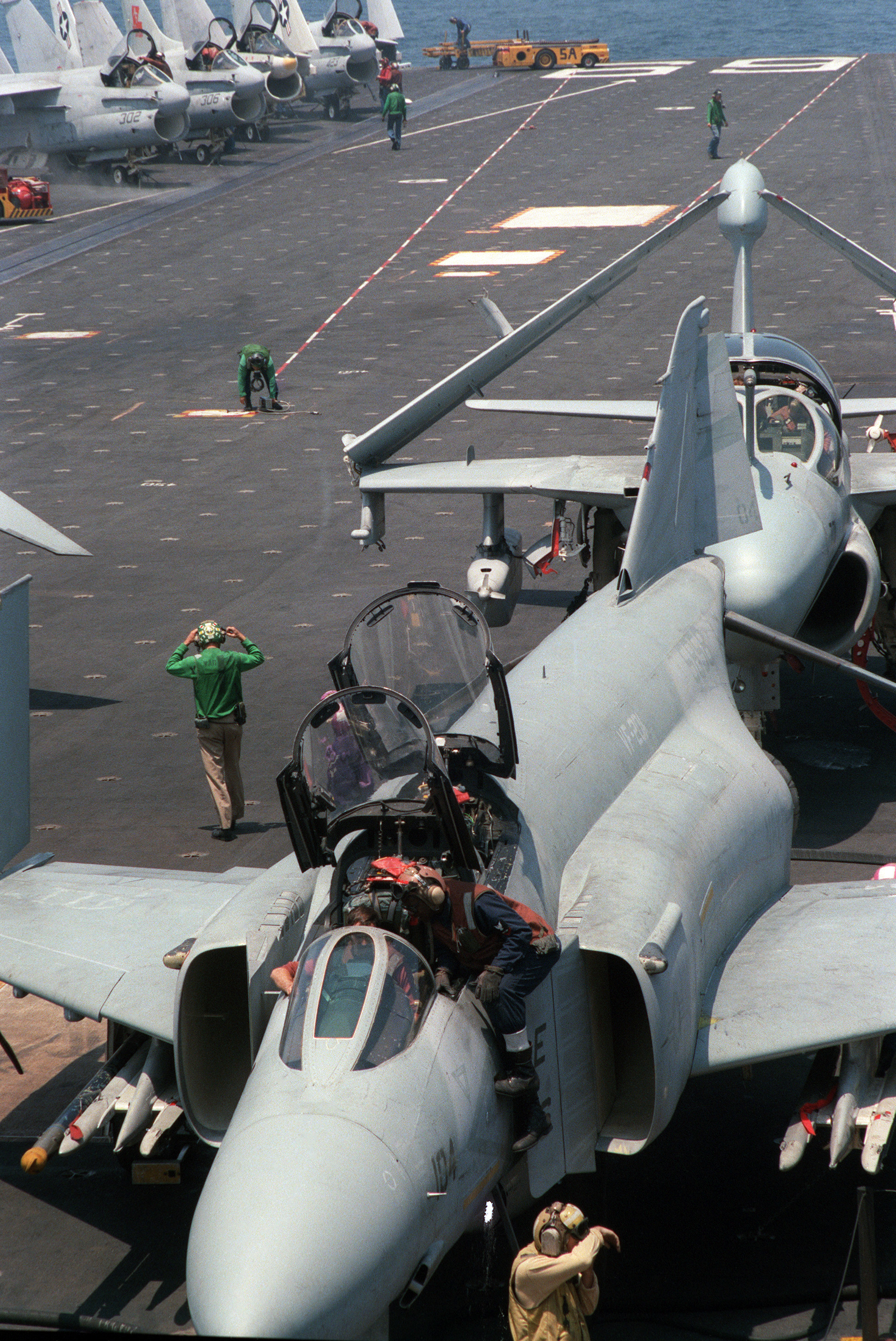
A F-4S of VF-201 and a VAQ-209 EA-6A Intruder aboard USS Dwight D. Eisenhower in 1985.

=== Establishment ===
VAQ-209 was established at Naval Air Station Norfolk, Virginia, on 1 October 1977, as part of the U.S. Navy Reserve Carrier Air Wing 20 (CVWR-20). The squadron first flew the EA-6A Intruder. The squadron received special permission from Lucasfilm to use the name and Darth Vader's likeness in their livery.

=== 1990s ===
In May 1990, VAQ-209 moved to Naval Air Facility Washington and began shifting to the EA-6B Prowler. This improved CVWR-20's electronic attack capability, and also marked the first homeporting of U.S. Navy EA-6Bs outside Naval Air Station Whidbey Island. In 1995, the squadron was deployed for combat operations over Bosnia and participated in Operation Deny Flight and Operation Deliberate Force. From 22 March to 22 September 1995, a two-plane detachment was deployed aboard the aircraft carrier USS Theodore Roosevelt as part of Carrier Air Wing Eight.

In 1998, VAQ-209 deployed with three EA-6B aircraft to Incirlik Air Base, Turkey, to conduct combat operations in Operation Northern Watch. During the operation, it was the first Navy Reserve Squadron in Incirlik, the first EA-6B squadron to bring the AGM-88 HARM and to develop operation-specific Prowler HARM and jamming tactics, and the first to be overall mission commander for strike packages. The squadron maintained 100% mission coverage and a 96% sortie completion rate.

In 1999, VAQ-209 received a 96-hour alert to prepare to deploy order for Operation Allied Force (OAF). It deployed with two aircraft, traveling via Lajes Field, Azores, to Aviano Air Base, Italy, on April 17. VAQ-209 provided sole maintenance support for VAQ-209, VAQ-138, and VAQ-140 EA-6Bs, accompanying the aircraft to Lajes and remaining there until April 20 to support follow-on movement of NAS Whidbey Island Prowlers. VAQ-209 entered combat operations on April 17, 1999, and continued until hostilities ended on June 21, 1999. During the operation, the squadron completed 150 combat sorties and over 550 combat flight hours with a 98% sortie completion rate and no injuries. The squadron left for its home station on 25 June 1999, flying through RAF Mildenhall, NAS Keflavik, Sondrestrom Air Base (Greenland), CFB Goose Bay, and NAS Brunswick, and arriving in NAF Washington on June 27, 1999.

=== 2000s ===
In March 2000, the squadron deployed again to Incirlik, with four aircraft to again support Operation Northern Watch. While in Turkey, VAQ-209 aircrew flew 75 combat sorties and over 250 mishap-free flight hours returning to NAF Washington in early May 2000. During 2000, VAQ-209 achieved 23 years and 24,000 hours of mishap-free flying.

In early 2001, the squadron deployed to Prince Sultan Air Base, Kingdom of Saudi Arabia (PSAB), for Operation Southern Watch (OSW). This was the first deployment of a reserve EA-6B squadron to that area of operations. VAQ-209 completed the 45-day deployment to PSAB, during which they flew 59 combat sorties and 191 flight hours, with a 100% sortie completion rate.

In August 2002, VAQ-209 deployed for the third time to Incirlik for Operation Northern Watch. This time VAQ-209 flew 88 combat sorties and over 300 flight hours before returning home in October. The squadron went on to set a calendar-year flight record of 1,539.4 flight hours.

The squadron deployed to the PACOM theater from April to June 2005. Soon after their return from Japan, the squadron was sent again to the Iraq War. In June 2006, VAQ-209 deployed to Al-Asad Airbase, Iraq. There the squadron continued its exemplary record, flying over 300 combat sorties for a combined total of more than 1,500 flight hours.

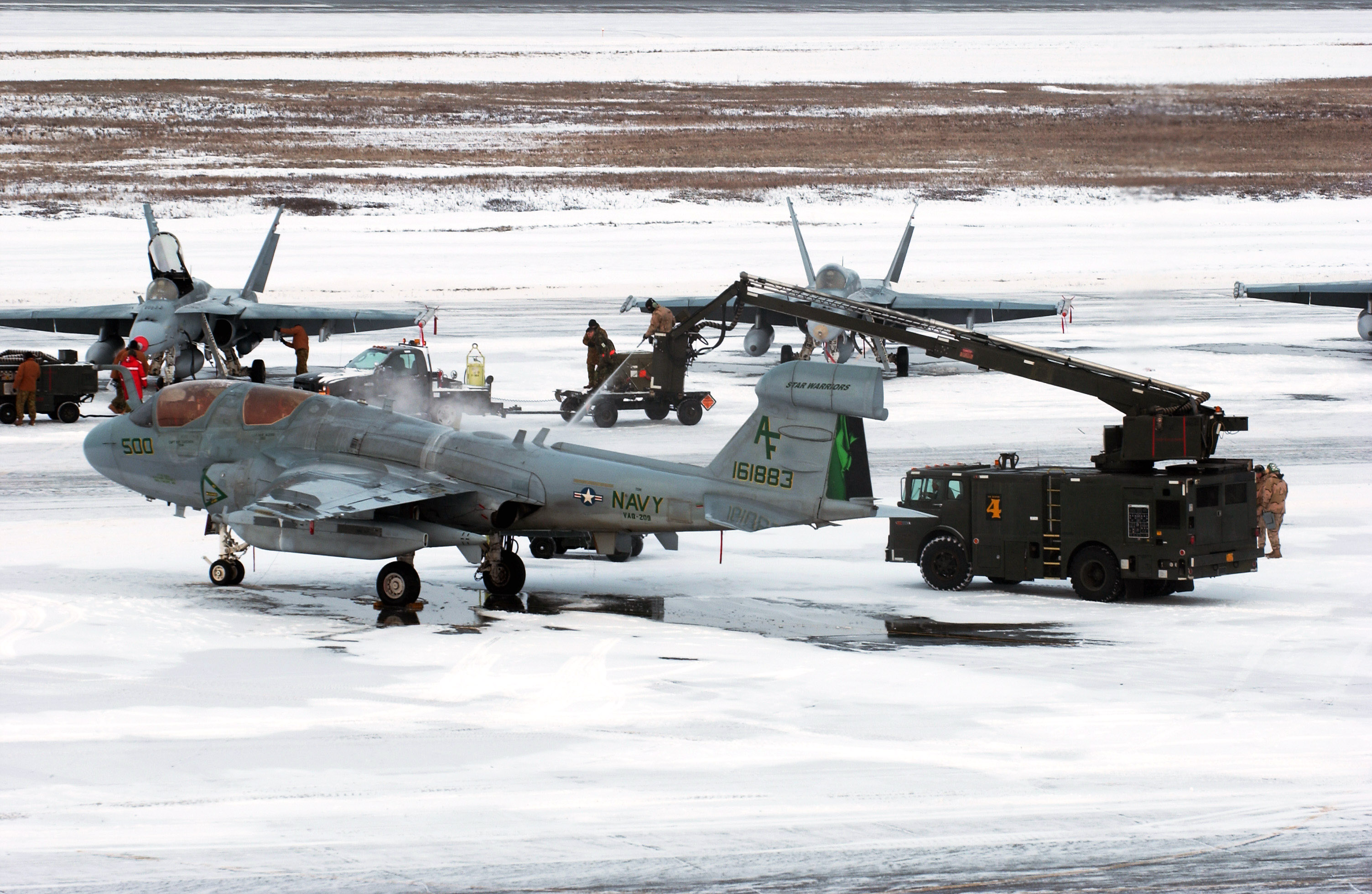
A VAQ-209 EA-6B is de-iced during Exercise Red Flag in 2008.

Less than two years later, VAQ-209 returned to combat, this time over Afghanistan. The squadron deployed for Operation Enduring Freedom from January to March 2008 and from March to May 2009. Operating out of Bagram Air Base, the squadron executed over 2,000 combat hours of flight time supporting US and ISAF forces on the ground. For their exemplary combat performance, the squadron was recognized as the CNAFR squadron of the year.

VAQ-209 returned to Joint Base Andrews, Washington on 4 November 2011 following an 85-day deployment in Afghanistan. During deployment, the squadron flew 193 combat sorties with a mission completion rate of 100 percent, delivering 769 hours of electronic combat suppression against the enemy while the VAQ-209 maintenance department accomplished a combat sortie completion rate of 99.51 percent. The squadron also handled more than 226 joint tactical air support requests (JTASR).

=== 2010s ===
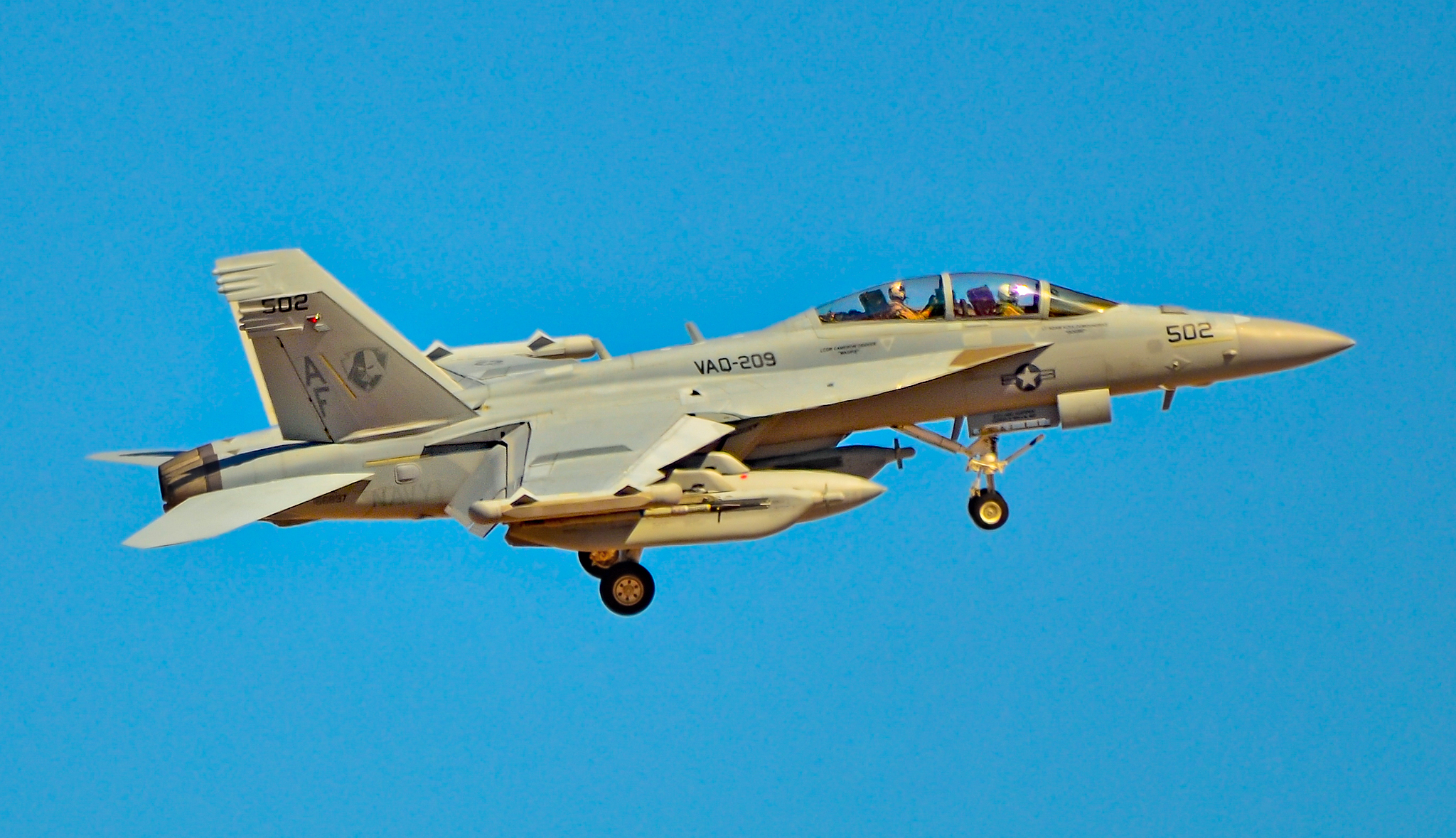
An EA-18G of VAQ-209 in 2016.

In May 2013, VAQ-209 flight crews took their final flight in the venerable EA-6B Prowler and began to shift their homeport to Naval Air Station Whidbey Island, Washington, the Navy's home for electronic attack. Along the way, the Star Warriors moved people and equipment across the country, sent nearly 100 sailors to both coasts on temporary training assignments, and put their aircrew and maintenance personnel through a year-long transition syllabus to learn to fly and maintain the new aircraft. VAQ-209 completed numerous detachments, completing trainings at Andrews AFB, NAS Oceana, NAS Point Mugu, NAS JRB New Orleans, NAS Key West, NAS Fallon, Eielson AFB, MCAS Miramar, and Nellis AFB.

In June 2014, VAQ-209 officially stood up as an EA-18G Growler squadron, gaining its "Safe-For-Flight" certification, accepting aircraft, and beginning flight operations.

In January 2016, after a year and a half of training and inspections, the Star Warriors made their first operational Growler deployment. VAQ-209 filled the Pacific Command requirement, allowing an active squadron to return home as scheduled. The deployment began in Guam, where the squadron participated in an AGM-88 High-speed Anti-Radiation Missile (HARM) live-fire exercise with U.S. Air Force units, honed their airborne electronic attack skills, and participated in Exercise Cope North, a combined exercise designed to increase interoperability among U.S. and coalition air forces operating in the Pacific Theater. In February, the squadron left the beaches of Guam for the snow of Misawa Air Base in northern Japan. While in Misawa, the Star Warriors integrated with the U.S. Air Force's 35th Fighter Wing and the Navy's Carrier Air Wing (CVW) 5 to further the joint collaboration that began on Guam. In March, the squadron detached to Osan Air Base, Republic of Korea (ROK), to participate in a maritime counter special operations forces exercise with Air Force and Navy units from the ROK, along with the U.S. Air Force and Navy units. In addition to gaining exposure to real-world flying conditions on the Korean peninsula, VAQ-209 was able to plan and integrate with USS John C. Stennis (CVN) 74 Carrier Strike Group and its embarked CVW-9, which were on patrol in the Western Pacific. The squadron returned home safely to their families and most Selective Reservists to their civilian careers in early April.

=== 2020s ===
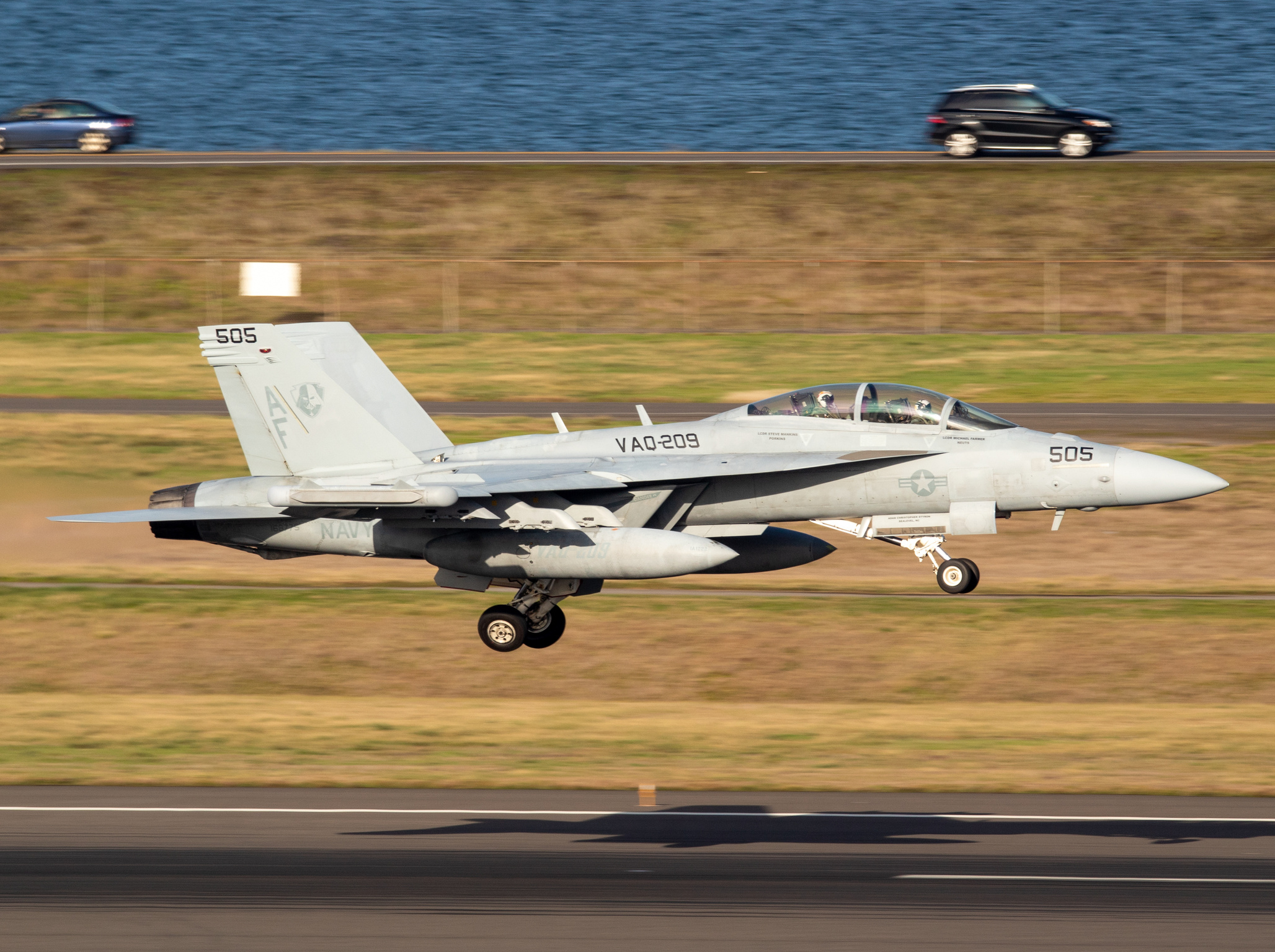
A VAQ-209 EA-18G at Portland International Airport in 2020.

As of 2020, VAQ-209 remains at their home base of Naval Air Station Whidbey Island, Washington. They continue to complete training and routine flights around the areas of Washington and Oregon.

== See also ==
- History of the United States Navy
- List of United States Navy aircraft squadrons
