= VAQ-134 =

Electronic Attack Squadron 134
- Active: 7 June 1969 - Present (57 years, 4 months)
- Country: United States
- Branch: United States Navy
- Type: Electronic Attack
- Role: Electronic Warfare
- Part of: Electronic Attack Wing Pacific
- Garrison/HQ: NAS Whidbey Island
- Nickname: Garudas
- Colors: #7f1518 #d6a229
- Mascot: Garuda
- Engagements: Operation Desert Shield; Operation Desert Storm; Operation Southern Watch; Operation Northern Watch; 1994 North Korean nuclear crisis Operation Allied Force; Operation Enduring Freedom; Operation Iraqi Freedom; Operation New Dawn; Operation Inherent Resolve
- Decorations: Safety "S" (5); Battle "E" (10); Admiral Arthur W. Radford Award (3); Top Hook (4); Meritorious Unit Commendation (4); Joint Meritorious Unit Award (2); Navy Unit Commendation
- Website: https://www.airpac.navy.mil/Organization/Electronic-Attack-Squadron-VAQ-134/

Commanders
- Commanding Officer: CAPT Whitney “WASP” Adams
- Executive Officer: CAPT Dominic “Shipmate” Defelice
- Command Master Chief: CMDCM J. E. ELMSTEAD

Insignia
- Callsign: MAZDA
- Modex: 53X
- Tail Code: NL

Aircraft flown
- Bomber: KA-3B Skywarrior (1969-1971)
- Electronic warfare: EKA-3B Skywarrior (1969-1971); EA-6B Prowler (1971-2016); EA-18G Growler (2016-Present)

Electronic Attack Squadron 134 (VAQ-134) is an electromagnetic warfare squadron of the United States Navy. It is nicknamed "Garudas" and is based at Naval Air Station Whidbey Island, Washington. The squadron is currently equipped with the Boeing EA-18G Growler.

== Squadron History ==
=== 1970s ===
Electronic Attack Squadron (VAQ-134) was originally established on 9 June 1969 at Naval Air Station Alameda, California, flying the EKA-3B electronic warfare/tanker and KA-3B tanker Skywarriors. VAQ-134 transitioned to Detachment 134 of VAQ-135 for its 1970-71 WestPac deployment aboard the USS Ranger, and stood down in July 1971, moving to its current homeport, Naval Air Station Whidbey Island.

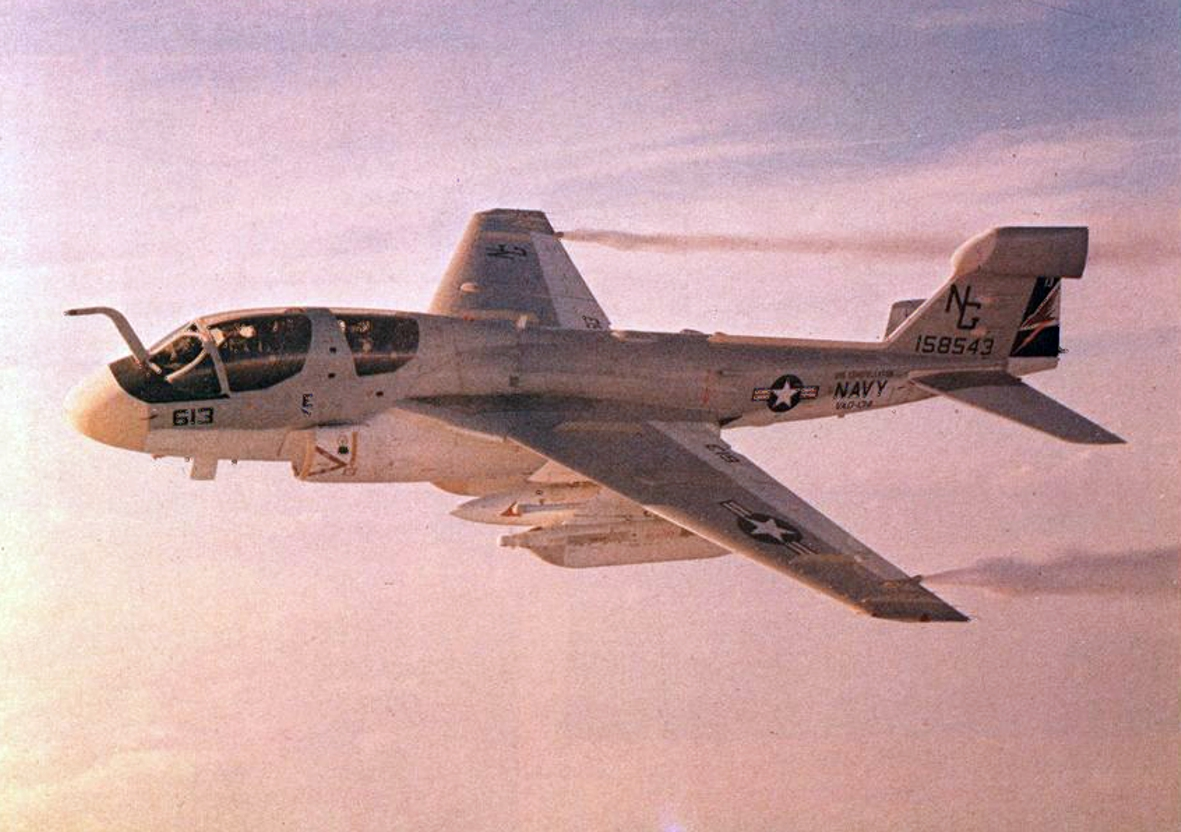
An EA-6B Prowler of VAQ-134 during USS Constellation's 1973 Vietnam deployment.

In 1972, the squadron received the EA-6B Prowler and became the U.S. Navy's third operational Prowler squadron.

In September 1977, the squadron received the newer Improved Capability (ICAP I) version of the EA-6B Prowler.

2 years later, in 1979, the squadron moved to the CVW-8 in the Atlantic on board the USS Nimitz for a deployment. It was during this deployment that the squadron took part in the failed rescue attempt of American hostages in Iran. Late that year, the squadron celebrated 10 years of flying mishap free.

=== 1980s ===
VAQ-134 moved back to the Pacific deploying aboard the USS Constellation as part of CVW-9 in the Indian Ocean in 1982. This included taking part in exercises with USS Midway and USS Ranger.

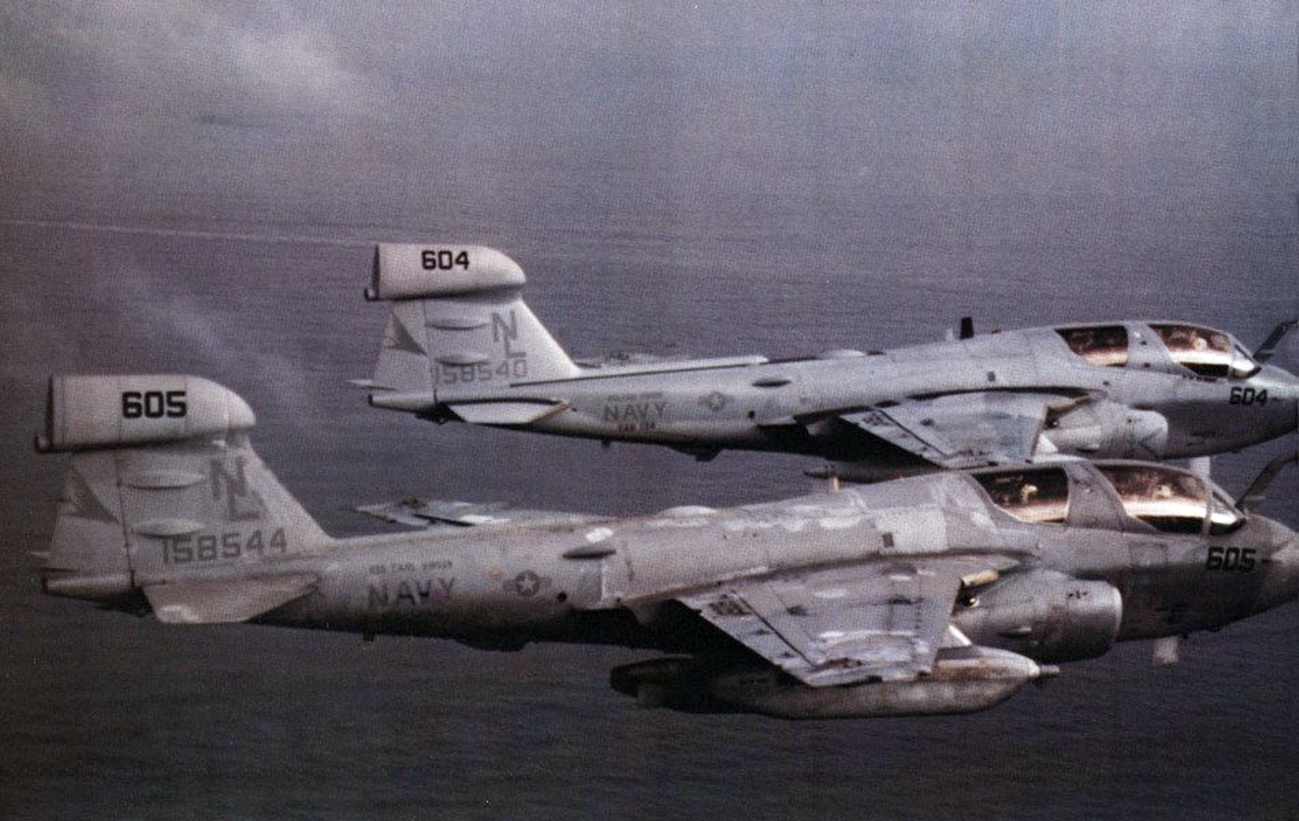
Grumman EA-6B Prowlers of VAQ-134 in flight, in 1983

Starting from September 1982, VAQ-134 would join Carrier Air Wing 15 (CVW-15) for 13 years. On 1 March 1983, the air wing and VAQ-134 deployed for the first cruise of the new Nimitz class carrier USS Carl Vinson around the world which lasted until 29 October. CVW-15 and VAQ-134 later make six more deployments on the Carl Vinson which included taking part in RIMPAC '84 and '86 as well as PACEX '89, the largest fleet exercise since World War II.

Before PACEX '89 the squadron transitioned to ICAP II Prowler in early 1989 which allowed them to fire the AGM-88 HARM missile. Later during PACEX '89 they would become the first carrier-deployed Prowler squadron to fire one.

=== 1990s ===
After 1990, the squadron and CVW-15 moved to the older USS Kitty Hawk between 1991 and 1994, they made three deployments. In 1991, the squadron won the "Top Hook" award for best landing grades during the cruise Kitty Hawk made when moving from Norfolk on the Atlantic side to San Diego on the Pacific side, dubbed the "Around the Horn" cruise.

In 1993, during operations as part of Operation Southern Watch, the squadron fired the AGM-88 HARM in combat for the first time. The last deployment with CVW-15 in June to December 1994 included passing through the Yellow Sea and Sea of Japan and Western Pacific as well as the KEEN EDGE, ANNUAL EX and TANDEM THRUST exercises. On 17 December, the squadron celebrated yet another milestone passing 34,000 hours and 24 years without mishap before returning home on the 22nd.

On 31 March 1995, after 26 years of service, VAQ-134 was disestablished for the first time along with CVW-15. The squadron would, however, be recommissioned again, this being called upon to deploy to MCAS Iwakuni in Japan as the U.S. Air Force retired the EF-111A Raven. In 1999, the "Garudas" took part in Operation Allied Force against Serbia while stationed in Italy.

=== 2000s and 2010s ===
During 2003, the squadron moved to Incirlik Air Base in Turkey to take part in Operation Northern Watch. This, however, was short-lived as Operation Iraqi Freedom came about, in which the squadron took part.

In December 2010, VAQ-134 deployed on a carrier for the first time in 10 years while on board the Carl Vinson again.

The EA-6B was originally going to be replaced by the EA-18G in early 2015, and the last deployment with the EA-6B was on USS George H.W. Bush in 2014. This transition however came in 2016 and after this, VAQ-134 deployed to Pacific as an expeditionary squadron. In 2017, they took part in Exercise Red Flag at Nellis Air Force Base, Nevada, as well as being stationed at Misawa Air Base in Japan with the 35th Fighter Wing of the United States Air Force.

=== 2020s ===
In March 2022, six squadron aircraft were deployed to Spangdahlem Air Base, Germany, in support of NATO's air policing efforts in the wake of the 2022 Russian invasion of Ukraine.

== Gallery ==
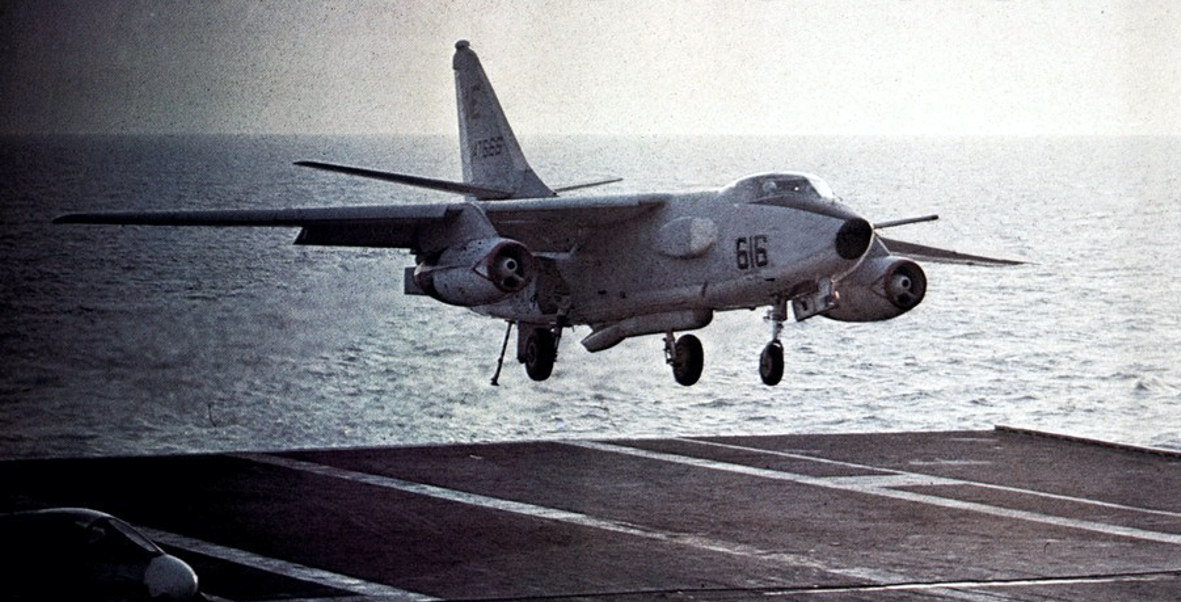
A VAQ-134 EKA-3B Skywarrior landing aboard USS Ranger, in 1969-1970

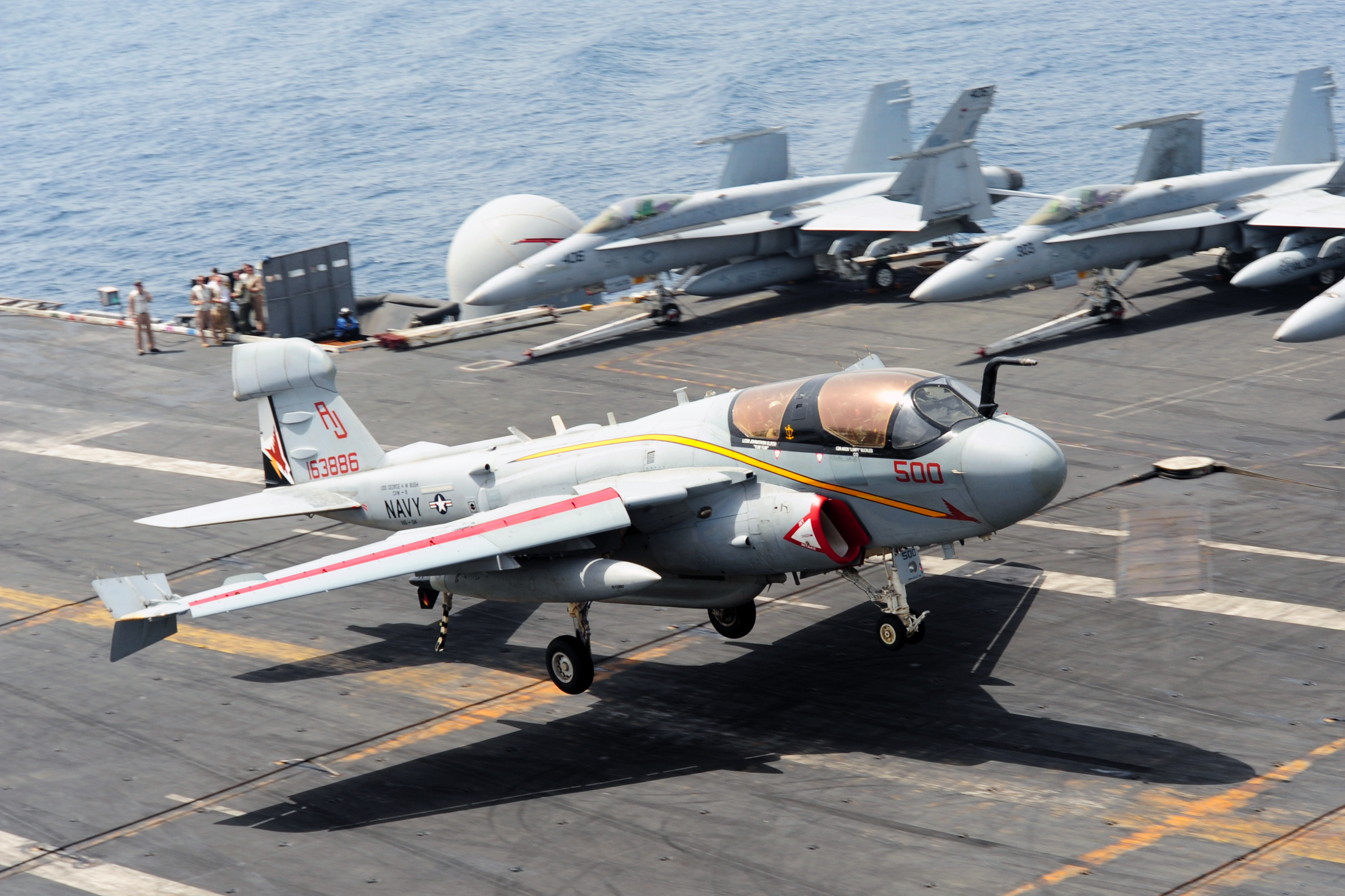
An EA-6B of VAQ-134 landing on USS George H.W. Bush in 2014

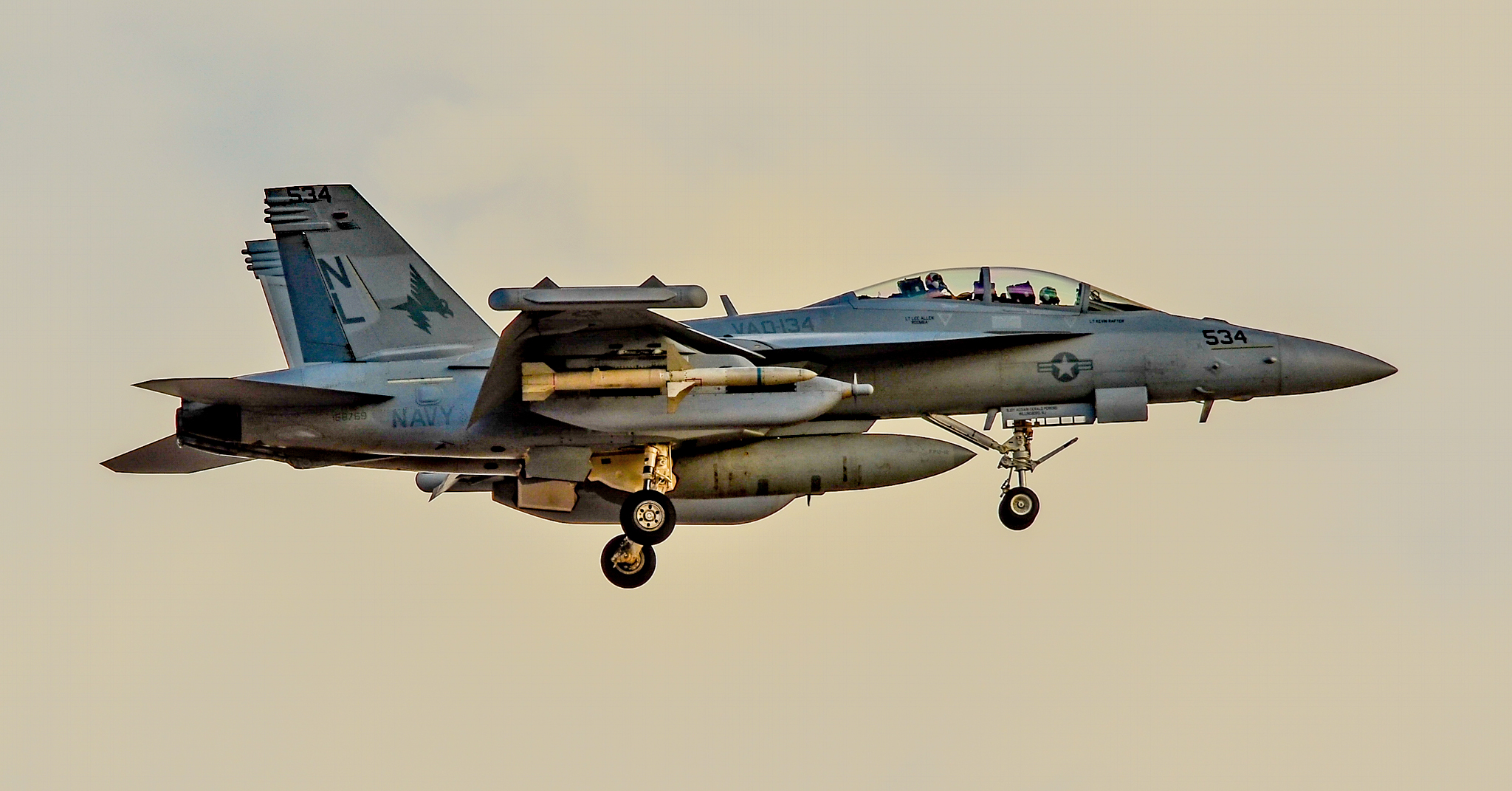
An EA-18G Growler of VAQ-134 landing at Nellis AFB in 2017

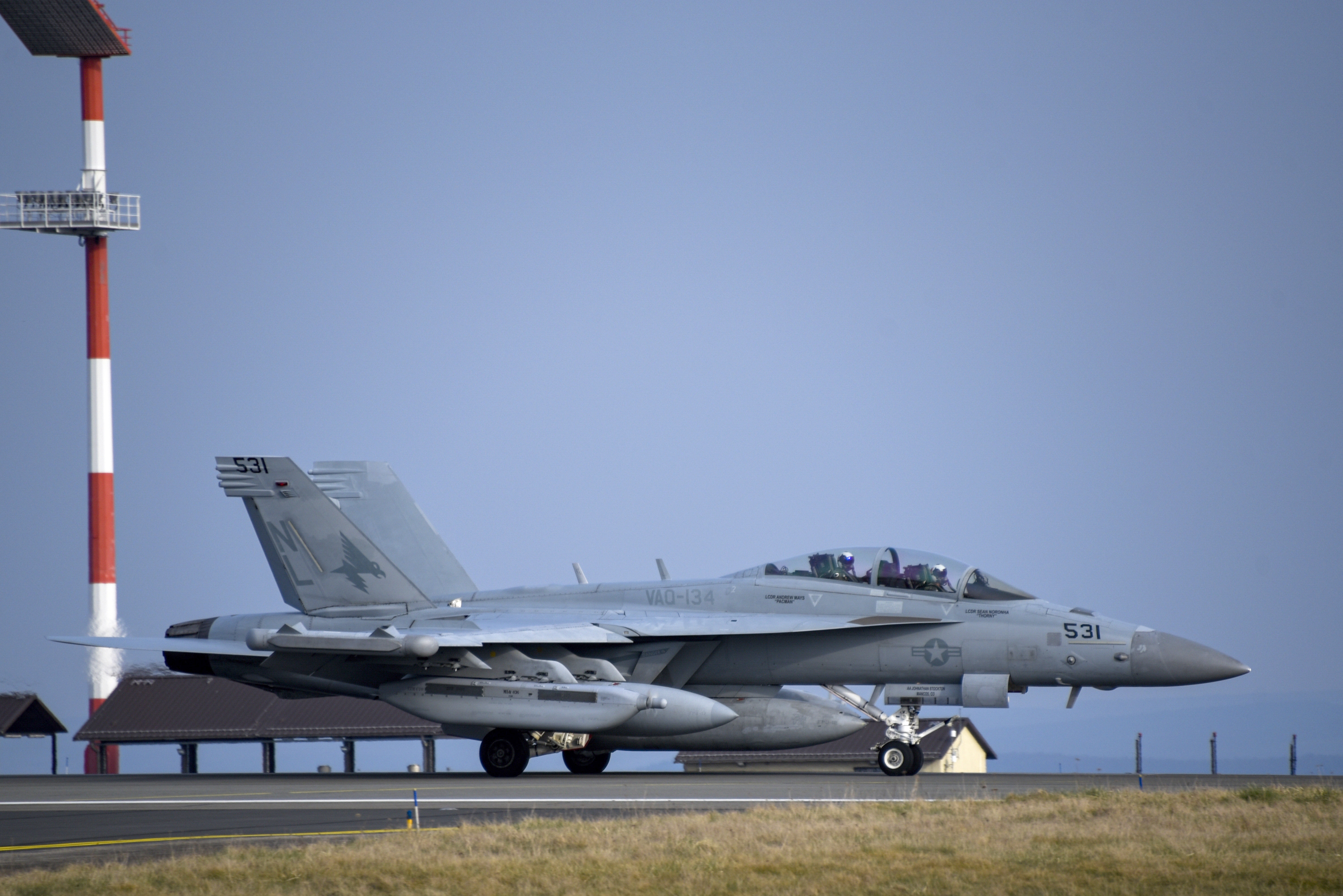
An EA-18G of VAQ-134 at Spangdahlem Air Base, March 2022

== See also ==
- History of the United States Navy
- List of United States Navy aircraft squadrons
