= Naval Air Station Whidbey Island =

U.S. Navy airbase in Washington state

- Ault Field
- Oak Harbor, Washington in the United States
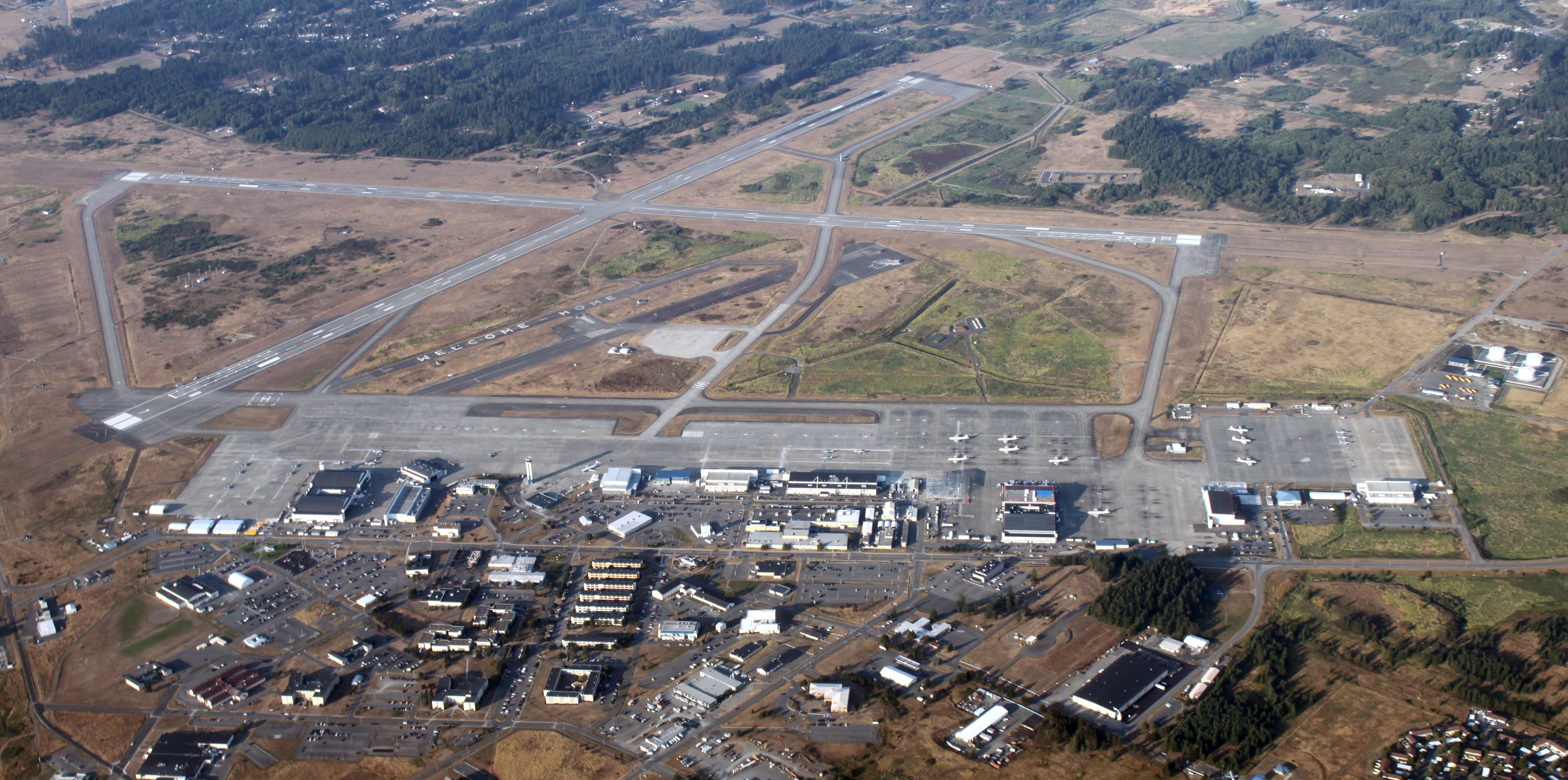
- An aerial view of NAS Whidbey Island

Site information
- Type: Naval Air Station
- Owner: Department of Defense
- Operator: US Navy
- Controlled by: Navy Region Northwest
- Condition: Operational
- Website: Official website

Location
- Location in the United States
- Coordinates: 48°21′07″N 122°39′21″W

Site history
- Built: 1942
- In use: 1942 – present

Garrison information
- Current commander: Captain Nathan J. Gammache

Airfield information
- Identifiers: IATA: NUW, ICAO: KNUW, FAA LID: NUW, WMO: 690230
- Elevation: 14.3 metres (47 ft) AMSL
Runways
Direction	Length and surface
7/25	2,438.4 metres (8,000 ft) Concrete
14/32	2,438.4 metres (8,000 ft) Concrete

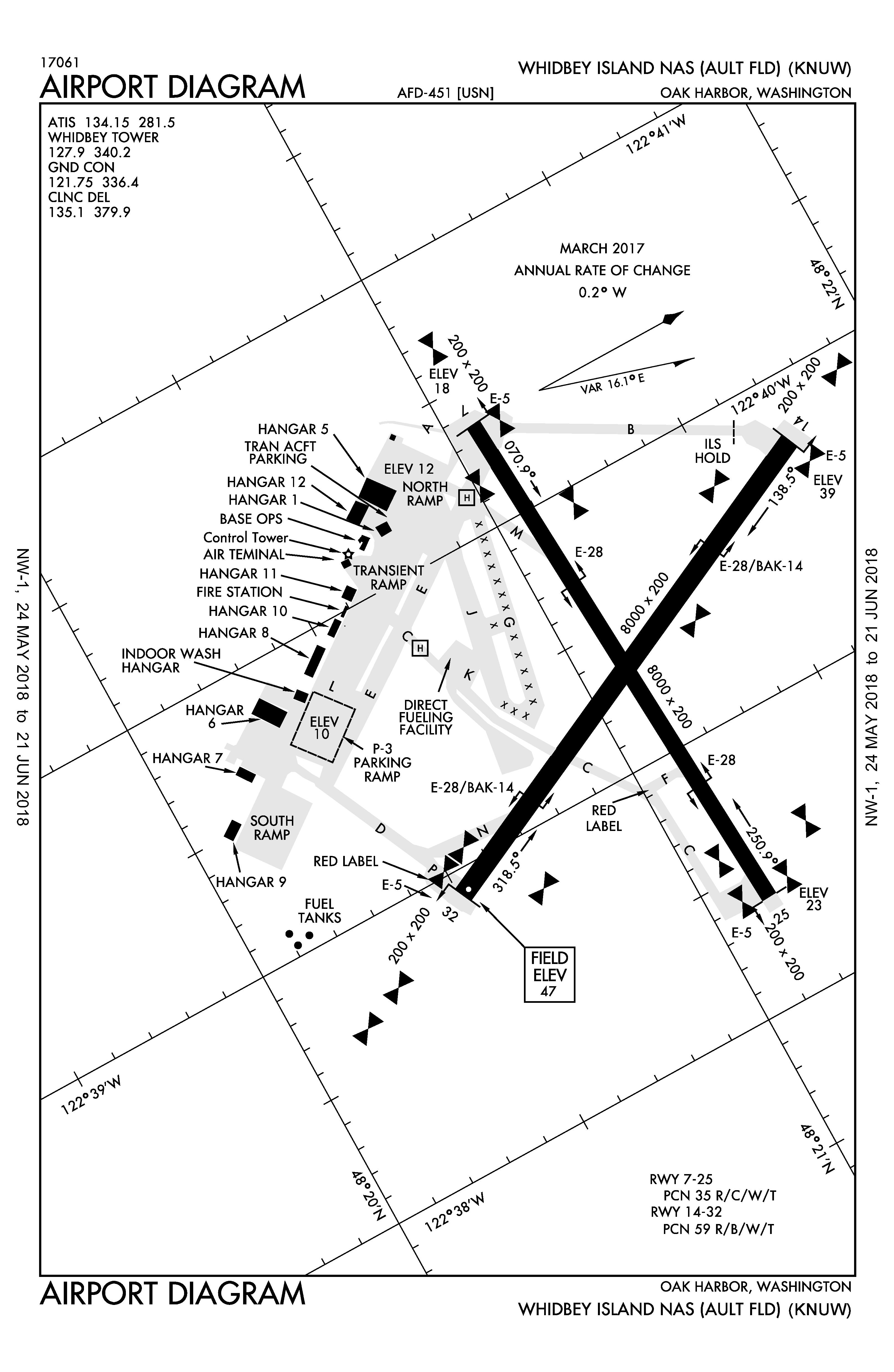
FAA diagram of the runway area

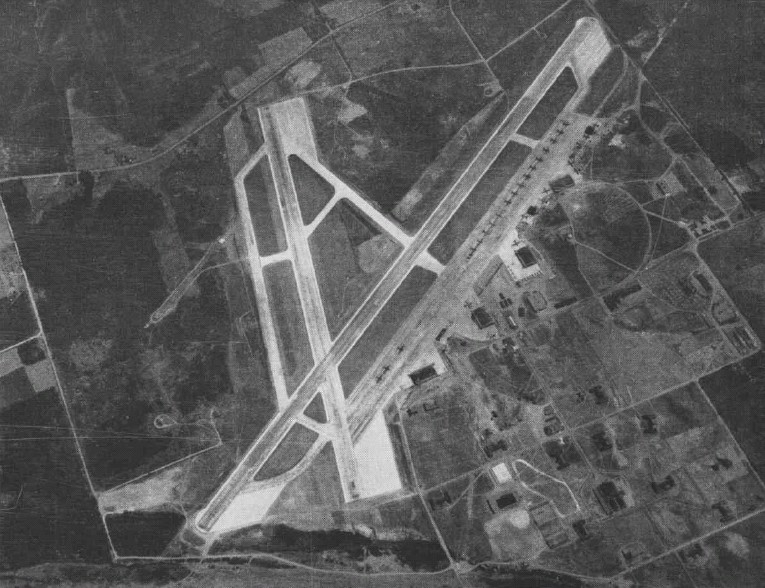
Aerial view of NAS Whidbey Island in the mid-1940s

Naval Air Station Whidbey Island (NASWI) (IATA: NUW, ICAO: KNUW, FAA LID: NUW) is a naval air station of the United States Navy located on two pieces of land near Oak Harbor, on Whidbey Island, in Island County, Washington.

The main portion of the base, Ault Field, is about three miles north of Oak Harbor. The other section, called the Seaplane base for the PBY Catalina flying boats once based there, holds most of the island's Navy housing as well as the air station's main Navy Exchange and DeCA Commissary. The NASWI commanding officer also has command of a satellite airfield, Naval Outlying Landing Field (NOLF) Coupeville, on central Whidbey Island at 48°11′24″N 122°37′48″W, roughly nine miles south of Ault Field. Primarily used for Field Carrier Landing Practice (FCLP) by carrier-based jets, this field has no permanently assigned personnel.

NASWI supports the EA-18G Growler, MH-60S Seahawk, P-8 Poseidon, and C-40 Clipper aircraft.

== History ==
=== 1940s ===
On 17 January 1941, almost 11 months before the United States entered World War II, the Office of the Chief of Naval Operations asked the Commandant of the 13th Naval District to find a location to re-arm and refuel U.S. Navy patrol planes defending Puget Sound. Lake Ozette, Indian Island, Keystone Harbor, Penn Cove and Oak Harbor were considered and rejected because of mountainous terrain, bluff shore front, inaccessibility, the absence of sufficient beaches, and lee shores. Within ten days, the commanding officer of Naval Air Station Seattle recommended the site of Saratoga Passage on the shores of Crescent Harbor and Forbes Point as a base suitable for seaplane takeoffs and landings under instrument conditions. A narrow strip of land tied Oak Harbor to what is now Maylor's Point Capehart Housing. Dredging, filling, and running water and power lines to the city were underway at the end of November when the word came to find a land plane site.

On December 8, three workers started a topographic survey of what would become Ault Field, about 4 miles (6.4 km) to the north. Construction of Ault Field started on 1 March 1942. The first plane landed there on 5 August, when Lieutenant Newton Wakefield, a former civil engineer and airline pilot, who later became the air station's Operations Officer, brought his SNJ single-engine trainer in with little fanfare. Everyone was busy working on the still-incomplete runway.

On 21 September 1942, the air station's first commanding officer, Captain Cyril Thomas Simard, read the orders placing the field in use as a Navy facility. U.S. Naval Air Station Whidbey Island was duly commissioned. A year later, on 25 September 1943, the land plane field was named Ault Field, in memory of Commander William B. Ault, missing in action in the previous year's Battle of the Coral Sea. Following the recommendation of the Interdepartmental Air Traffic Control Board, an area 2.5 miles (4.0 km) southeast of Coupeville was approved as an auxiliary field to serve NAS Seattle. Survey work began in February 1943, and work started in March. Naval Outlying Landing Field (NOLF) Coupeville was in use by September.

At Ault Field, the earliest squadrons of aircraft were Grumman F4F Wildcats, which came aboard in 1942, followed by Grumman F6F Hellcats. Later that year, Lockheed PV-1 Venturas arrived for training. By the end of 1943, all Wildcats were gone, replaced by the Hellcat. In 1944, Douglas SBD Dauntless dive-bombers became the predominant aircraft at Ault Field, while at the Seaplane Base, several Consolidated PBY Catalina and Martin PBM Mariner seaplanes were aboard in the summer of 1944, augmented by a few land-based Martin B-26 Marauders that arrived earlier that year to be used for towing targets.

After World War II, operations slowed and the station was placed on reduced operating status. Many naval air stations across the United States were closing because they could not meet the requirements on post-war naval aviation; 6,000 feet (1,800 m) runways were now the minimum standard and approach paths had to be suitable for radar-controlled approaches in any weather. Lockheed P2V Neptune patrol bombers, which arrived in the late 1940s, would eventually make up six patrol squadrons at NAS Whidbey.

=== 1950s ===
The Korean War restored NAS Whidbey to life and expansion and construction accelerated. Throughout the early 1950s, Whidbey's primary land based patrol aircraft was the Lockheed P2 Neptune.

During the Korean War, patrol plane activity was stepped up again with several Naval Air Reserve units being called up and redesignated as active duty squadrons. By the end of the war, there were six VP (Patrol) squadrons and two Fleet Air Support squadrons based at Whidbey. In 1955, VP-29 returned from a deployment to the Pacific and was disestablished with its crews forming the nucleus of Heavy Attack Squadron Two (VAH-2), the first heavy attack squadron on the West Coast, the "heavy" designation reflecting its concentration on nuclear weapons delivery. Later that year, it moved to NAS North Island in San Diego to switch to the Douglas A-3D Skywarrior.

In 1958, the Heavy Attack Squadron Six (VAH-6), moved from NAS Moffett Field, California, where they had been the Navy's second nuclear attack squadron. As part of CVG-61/CVW-6, the squadron then made several WestPac deployments aboard the USS Ranger prior to transferring to CVW-8 for operations in the Mediterranean aboard the USS Forrestal. The squadron was transferred to Naval Air Station Sanford, Florida, in September 1965.

=== 1960s ===
In the first quarter of 1960 a search and rescue (SAR) team was started at NAS Whidbey Island. Two Sikorsky HRS-2 helicopters, more commonly referred to as H-19 Chickasaws, were assigned to the SAR team soon to be replaced by two HRS-3's. The aircrewmen assigned to SAR were initially told this would be a two-year trial period during which time it would be decided if it would be permanent. If it didn't work it would be shut down.

In early 1965, patrol squadrons began to leave NAS Whidbey; VP-47 transferred to NAS Moffett Field and VP-17 to NAS Barbers Point, Hawaii. In July 1969, the patrol community appeared to be reviving with the delivery of the Lockheed P-3 Orion as a replacement for the venerable Lockheed P-2 Neptune, but in September 1969, VP-2 and VP-42 were deactivated.

=== 1970s ===
On 1 March 1970, VP-1 transferred to NAS Barbers Point, ending seaplane patrol operations by active forces at NAS Whidbey Island. This also brought Fleet Air Wing Four to an end on 1 April 1970, leaving Patrol Squadron Sixty-nine (VP-69), a Naval Air Reserve squadron, as the sole remaining maritime patrol squadron at NAS Whidbey Island. Then in the 1970s and beyond, 16 Grumman A-6 Intruder squadrons were based at NAS Whidbey Island. Whidbey was now the West Coast training and operations center for these all-weather, medium attack bomber squadrons. In October 1970, Heavy Attack Squadron 10 (VAH-10) was redesignated Tactical Electronic Warfare Squadron 129 (VAQ-129), the Navy's first Northrop Grumman EA-6B Prowler squadron and the sole fleet replacement squadron for Navy and United States Marine Corps Prowler crews. With the exception of a forward deployed EA-6B squadron at NAF Atsugi, Japan and a sole Naval Air Reserve EA-6B squadron (VAQ-209) at Andrews AFB / NAF Washington, Maryland, NAS Whidbey Island supported all of the U.S. Navy's Prowler squadrons.

=== 1990s ===
In late 1993, with the pending closures of NAS Moffett Field and NAS Barbers Point, additional P-3C Orion maritime patrol aircraft came aboard NAS Whidbey Island, along with the associated staffs of Commander, Patrol Wings, U.S. Pacific Fleet (COMPATWINGSPAC) and Commander, Patrol Wing TEN (COMPATWING 10). With the closure of Naval Air Station Agana, Guam, Fleet Air Reconnaissance Squadron ONE (VQ-1) also arrived at NAS Whidbey Island in 1994 with its Lockheed EP-3E Aries II aircraft. VQ-1 was placed under the clemency of COMPATWING 10 and the wing was redesignated Commander, Patrol and Reconnaissance Wing TEN (COMPATRECONWING 10). With the disestablishment of Reserve Patrol Wing, VP-69 was also placed under COMPATRECONWING 10.

In 1997, the last Pacific-based A-6E Intruder squadron, VA-196 was disestablished after a lengthy deployment for WESTPAC 1996.

=== 2000s ===
In January 2009, VAQ-129 accepted its first Boeing EA-18G Growler electronic warfare aircraft which replaced the Navy's EA-6Bs.

=== 2010s ===
Patrol Squadron 4 (VP-4) became the first squadron at NAS Whidbey Island to convert to the P-8 Poseidon maritime patrol aircraft in October 2016. On October 31, 2016 the new P-8A training center at NAS Whidbey Island opened.

== Present day ==
In all, there are 20 active duty U.S. Navy squadrons and three U.S Navy Reserve squadrons based at NAS Whidbey Island. The air station also maintains a search and rescue unit that flies two Sikorsky MH-60S Nighthawk helicopters, providing 24-hour day and night maritime, inland and mountainous rescue support for Department of Defense personnel and the greater Pacific Northwest community. The SAR Unit provides 15-minute alert coverage Monday through Thursday from 0800–0200 or last plane on deck, Friday 0800-2200 or last plane on deck and 30-minute alert coverage at all other times of the year. Additionally, SAR has organic SAR Medical Technicians on all missions it performs. NASWI SAR primarily serves military aircrews, but missions to help civilians in distress are often approved and executed.

Over 50 tenant commands are at NAS Whidbey Island to provide training, medical and dental, and other support services, including a United States Air Force (USAF) squadron (390th ECS) which is an administrative unit supporting USAF officers assigned to some U.S. Navy EA-18G Growler squadrons. The base also continues its longstanding role as a center of activity for Naval Air Reserve operations and training in the region.

== Tenant squadrons ==
Insignia	Squadron	Code	Callsign/Nickname	Assigned Aircraft	Operational Assignment	Administrative Assignment
	Electronic Attack Squadron 129	VAQ-129	Vikings	EA-18G Growler	Fleet Replacement Squadron (FRS)	Commander, Electronic Attack Wing Pacific (COMVAQWINGPAC)
	Electronic Attack Squadron 130	VAQ-130	Zappers	EA-18G Growler	Carrier Air Wing Three	Commander, Electronic Attack Wing Pacific (COMVAQWINGPAC)
	Electronic Attack Squadron 131	VAQ-131	Lancers	EA-18G Growler	Forward/Expeditionary Deployments	Commander, Electronic Attack Wing Pacific (COMVAQWINGPAC)
	Electronic Attack Squadron 132	VAQ-132	Scorpions	EA-18G Growler	Forward/Expeditionary Deployments	Commander, Electronic Attack Wing Pacific (COMVAQWINGPAC)
	Electronic Attack Squadron 133	VAQ-133	Wizards	EA-18G Growler	Carrier Air Wing Nine	Commander, Electronic Attack Wing Pacific (COMVAQWINGPAC)
	Electronic Attack Squadron 134	VAQ-134	Garudas	EA-18G Growler	Forward/Expeditionary Deployments	Commander, Electronic Attack Wing Pacific (COMVAQWINGPAC)
	Electronic Attack Squadron 135	VAQ-135	Black Ravens	EA-18G Growler	Forward/Expeditionary Deployments	Commander, Electronic Attack Wing Pacific (COMVAQWINGPAC)
	Electronic Attack Squadron 136	VAQ-136	Gauntlets	EA-18G Growler	Carrier Air Wing Two	Commander, Electronic Attack Wing Pacific (COMVAQWINGPAC)
	Electronic Attack Squadron 137	VAQ-137	Rooks	EA-18G Growler	Carrier Air Wing Eleven	Commander, Electronic Attack Wing Pacific (COMVAQWINGPAC)
	Electronic Attack Squadron 138	VAQ-138	Yellowjackets	EA-18G Growler	Forward/Expeditionary Deployments	Commander, Electronic Attack Wing Pacific (COMVAQWINGPAC)
	Electronic Attack Squadron 139	VAQ-139	Cougars	EA-18G Growler	Carrier Air Wing Seventeen	Commander, Electronic Attack Wing Pacific (COMVAQWINGPAC)
	Electronic Attack Squadron 140	VAQ-140	Patriots	EA-18G Growler	Carrier Air Wing Seven	Commander, Electronic Attack Wing Pacific (COMVAQWINGPAC)
	Electronic Attack Squadron 142	VAQ-142	Grey Wolves	EA-18G Growler	Carrier Air Wing Eight	Commander, Electronic Attack Wing Pacific (COMVAQWINGPAC)
	Electronic Attack Squadron 144	VAQ-144	Main Battery	EA-18G Growler	Carrier Air Wing One	Commander, Electronic Attack Wing Pacific (COMVAQWINGPAC)
	Electronic Attack Squadron 209	VAQ-209	Star Warriors	EA-18G Growler	Commander, Tactical Support Wing (TSW)	Commander, Tactical Support Wing (TSW)
	USAF 390th Electronic Combat Squadron	390th ECS	Wild Boars	EA-18G Growler	366th Operations Group	366th Fighter Wing
	Patrol Squadron 1	VP-1	Screaming Eagles	P-8A Poseidon	Commander, Patrol and Reconnaissance Wing Ten (COMPATRECONWING 10)	Commander, Patrol and Reconnaissance Wing Ten (COMPATRECONWING 10)
	Patrol Squadron 4	VP-4	Skinny Dragons	P-8A Poseidon	Commander, Patrol and Reconnaissance Wing Ten (COMPATRECONWING 10)	Commander, Patrol and Reconnaissance Wing Ten (COMPATRECONWING 10)
	Patrol Squadron 9	VP-9	Golden Eagles	P-8A Poseidon	Commander, Patrol and Reconnaissance Wing Ten (COMPATRECONWING 10)	Commander, Patrol and Reconnaissance Wing Ten (COMPATRECONWING 10)
	Unmanned Patrol Squadron 11 (Note: VUP-11 to be established in 2025)	VUP-11	Proud Pegasus	MQ-4C Triton	Commander, Patrol and Reconnaissance Wing Ten (COMPATRECONWING 10)	Commander, Patrol and Reconnaissance Wing Ten (COMPATRECONWING 10)
	Patrol Squadron 40	VP-40	Fighting Marlins	P-8A Poseidon	Commander, Patrol and Reconnaissance Wing Ten (COMPATRECONWING 10)	Commander, Patrol and Reconnaissance Wing Ten (COMPATRECONWING 10)
	Patrol Squadron 46	VP-46	Grey Knights	P-8A Poseidon	Commander, Patrol and Reconnaissance Wing Ten (COMPATRECONWING 10)	Commander, Patrol and Reconnaissance Wing Ten (COMPATRECONWING 10)
	Patrol Squadron 47	VP-47	Golden Swordsmen	P-8A Poseidon	Commander, Patrol and Reconnaissance Wing Ten (COMPATRECONWING 10)	Commander, Patrol and Reconnaissance Wing Ten (COMPATRECONWING 10)
	Patrol Squadron 69	VP-69	Totems	P-8A Poseidon	Commander, Patrol and Reconnaissance Wing Ten (COMPATRECONWING 10)	Commander, Maritime Support Wing (MSW)
	Tactical Operations Control Squadron 10	TOCRON 10	Kraken		Commander, Patrol and Reconnaissance Wing Ten (COMPATRECONWING 10)	Commander, Patrol and Reconnaissance Wing Ten (COMPATRECONWING 10)
	Fleet Logistics Support Squadron 61	VR-61	Islanders	C-40A Clipper	Commander, Fleet Logistics Support Wing (COMFLELOGSUPPWING)	Commander, Fleet Logistics Support Wing (COMFLELOGSUPPWING)
	Station SAR Whidbey (Note: Prior to October 2025 SAR was a division of the station's Air Operations Department. On 1 October 2025 it was established as a separate unit administratively assigned to Commander, Helicopter Sea Combat Wing Pacific and was renamed "Station SAR Whidbey" (Note: At the same time the SAR units at NAS Lemoore and at NAS Key West were also established as units of HSCWINGs LANT and PAC and were renamed Station SAR Lemoore and Station SAR Key West))	STASAR Whidbey		MH-60S "Knighthawk"	Naval Air Station Whidbey Island (NASWI)	Commander, Helicopter Sea Combat Wing Pacific (COMHSCWINGPAC)
	Electronic Attack Weapons School	EAWS		EA-18G Growler	Commander, Electronic Attack Wing Pacific (COMVAQWINGPAC)	Commander, Electronic Attack Wing Pacific (COMVAQWINGPAC)
	Fleet Readiness Center Northwest	FRCNW			Naval Air Station Whidbey Island (NASWI)	Commander, Fleet Readiness Centers (COMFRC)

== Demographics ==
Historical population
Census	Pop.	Note	%±
1970	1,478		—
1980	2,553		72.7%
1990	3,795		48.6%
2000	2,064		−45.6%
2010	1,541		−25.3%
2020	1,671		8.4%
U.S. Decennial Census; 1960 1970 1980 1990; 2000 2010

Whidbey Island Station is also a census-designated place (CDP). The community was first listed as an unincorporated place in the 1970 U.S. census under the name Ault Field; and redesignated as a census designated place in the 1980 U.S. census. The CDP was renamed Whidbey Island Station prior to the 2010 U.S. census.

According to the United States Census Bureau, the CDP has a total area of 6.6 square miles (17.2 km^{2}), of which 0.02 square miles (0.05 km^{2}), or 0.30%, are water.

The installation is served by the Oak Harbor School District.

=== Racial and ethnic composition ===
Whidbey Island Station CDP, Washington – Racial and ethnic composition Note: the US Census treats Hispanic/Latino as an ethnic category. This table excludes Latinos from the racial categories and assigns them to a separate category. Hispanics/Latinos may be of any race.
Race / Ethnicity (NH = Non-Hispanic)	Pop 2000	Pop 2010	Pop 2020	% 2000	% 2010	% 2020
White alone (NH)	1,286	977	817	62.31%	63.40%	48.89%
Black or African American alone (NH)	210	156	255	10.17%	10.12%	15.26%
Native American or Alaska Native alone (NH)	29	18	6	1.41%	1.17%	0.36%
Asian alone (NH)	219	103	116	10.61%	6.68%	6.94%
Native Hawaiian or Pacific Islander alone (NH)	16	11	11	0.78%	0.71%	0.66%
Other race alone (NH)	3	0	9	0.15%	0.00%	0.54%
Mixed race or Multiracial (NH)	70	72	89	3.39%	4.67%	5.33%
Hispanic or Latino (any race)	231	204	368	11.19%	13.24%	22.02%
Total	2,064	1,541	1,671	100.00%	100.00%	100.00%

== See also ==
- List of United States Navy airfields
- List of United States Navy aircraft squadrons
