= VP-69 =

Patrol Squadron 69
- VP-69 insignia
- Active: 1 November 1970 - present
- Country: United States
- Branch: United States Navy
- Type: Squadron
- Role: Maritime patrol
- Nickname: Totems

Aircraft flown
- Patrol: SP-2H; P-3A/B/C; P-8A

VP-69 is a Patrol Squadron of the United States Navy Reserve. The squadron was established on 1 November 1970.

== Operational history ==
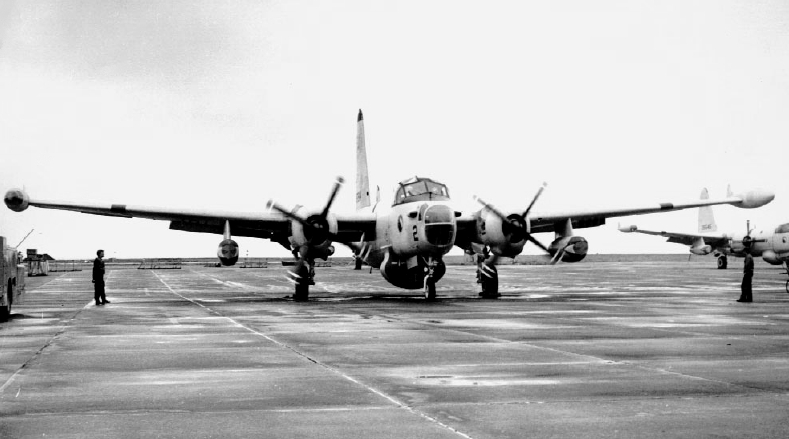
VP-69 SP-2H at NAS Whidbey Island, 1970s

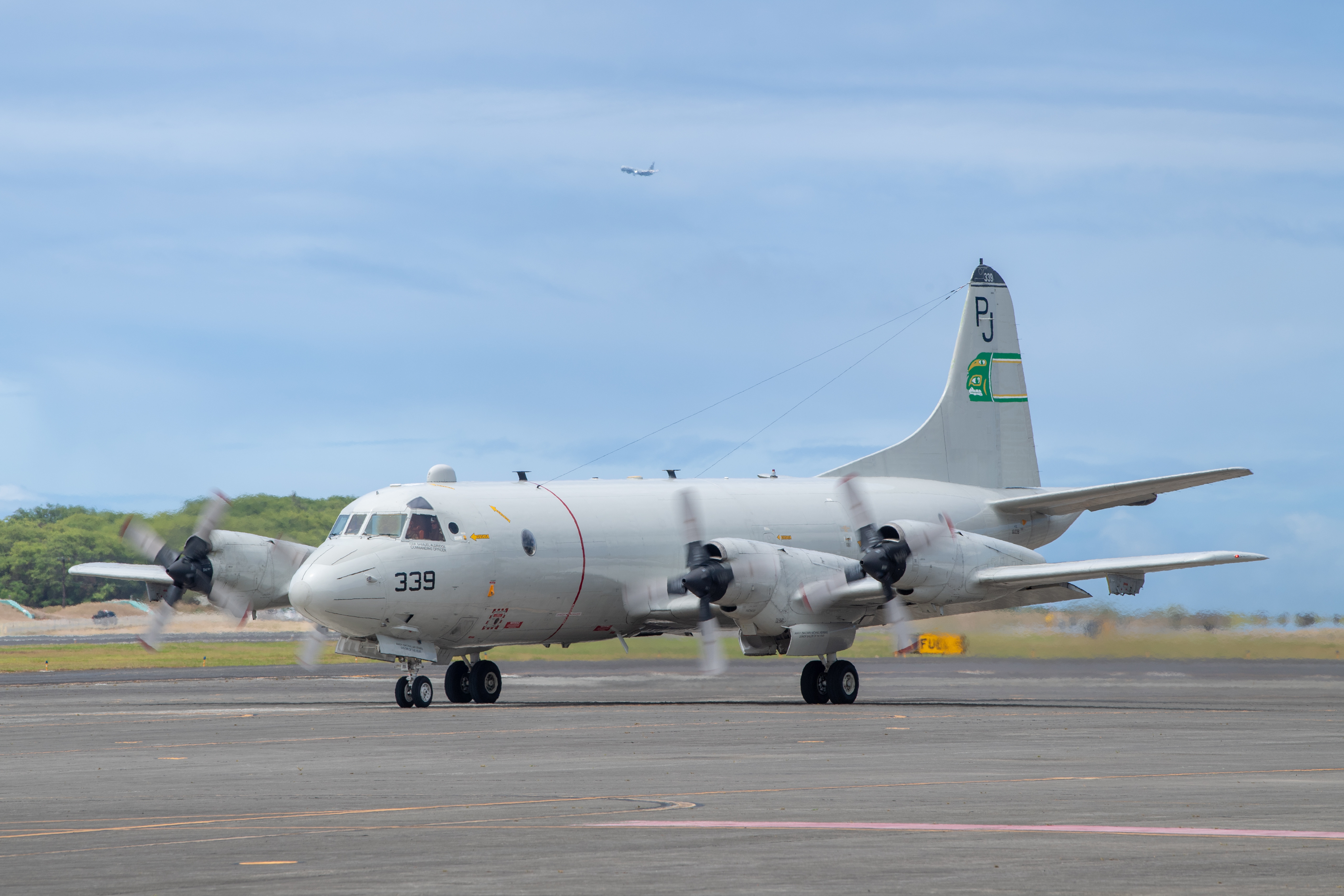
VP-69 P-3C taxiing in 2022

- 1 November 1970: VP-69 was established at NAS Whidbey Island, Washington, as a Naval Air Reserve land-based patrol squadron flying 12 SP-2H Neptune aircraft. The new squadron came under the operational and administrative control of Commander, Naval Air Reserve Forces, Pacific, and Commander, Fleet Air Reserve Wings, Pacific. VP-69 was established as a result of a major reorganization of Naval Air Reserve that took place in mid-1970. Under the Reserve Force Squadron concept 12 land-based naval reserve patrol squadrons were formed and structured along the lines of regular Navy squadrons with nearly identical organization and manning levels. The 12/2/1 concept had 12 VP squadrons under two commands, COMFAIRESWINGLANT and COMFAIRESWINGPAC. These two commands came under the control of one central authority, Commander Naval Air Reserve. Personnel and equipment from the disestablished VP-60T1 at NAS Whidbey Island were utilized to form VP-69.
- 2–31 October 1971: The squadron's scheduled deployment to NS Rota, Spain, was canceled at the last moment due to runway repairs at NS Rota. VP-69 deployed instead in two sections to NAS South Weymouth, Massachusetts.
- July 1972: VP-69 deployed to NAS Barbers Point, Hawaii, for its annual ADT. Crews were divided into two sections, flying the squadron's eight operational aircraft 16 days each. Training was conducted on flights to Midway Island, and in maintaining position fixes on the Soviet trawler fleet.
- 14 July 1973: VP-69 dedicated its new $3 million hangar at NAS Whidbey Island.
- 8 November 1975: The squadron's first P-3A Orion was received as the replacement aircraft for the SP-2H Neptune. Both of the squadron's wings devoted their two-week ADT periods in November to ground training related to the P-3 transition.
- 14 August – 12 September 1976: Annual ADT was conducted at NAS Barbers Point. Both consecutive two-week periods were devoted to transition training on the new P-3A aircraft then being flown by the squadron.
- 8 June – 8 July 1978: VP-69 deployed for its annual ADT to NAS Agana, Guam. This deployment marked a change in CNO policy, involving reserve patrol squadrons directly in operational assignments rather than non-operational training exercises. The squadron operated as a functional entity of Patrol Wing-1 Det Agana during the entire deployment under the new "one-Navy" policy.
- January 1981: A squadron aircraft (BuNo. 152161) made a crash landing at NAS Whidbey Island without casualties during a routine training flight. Three crew members were injured and the aircraft was damaged beyond repair.
- May 1981: VP-69 deployed a five aircraft detachment to NAF Kadena, Okinawa, relieving VP-90. Many of the squadron's 111 sorties conducted during the deployment involved searches for Vietnamese boat people in the South China Sea.
- 4 January – 23 February 1986: The squadron provided coverage for seven weeks of ADT operating out of Howard AFB, Panama, while conducting 33 drug interdiction flights resulting in 304 contacts.
- January 1987: VP-69 completed the P-3A TAC/NAV MOD transition process two months ahead of schedule. The TAC/NAV MOD version replaced the inertial navigation and tactical display systems with low-frequency navigation system and digital computer. The IRDS/HACLS modifications added infrared detection and Harpoon anti-ship missile launch capability to the aircraft.
- January 1990: VP-69 received its first P-3B aircraft. The P-3B had more powerful engines and improved avionics.
- October 1990: The squadron's last P-3A aircraft (BuNo. 152152) was flown to the National Naval Aviation Museum at NAS Pensacola, Florida.
- October 1992: The squadron received its first P-3C UI aircraft. It had a sevenfold increase in computer memory, an Omega worldwide navigation system, increased sound processing sensitivity, improved magnetic tape transport, improved DIFAR and additional tactical display sensor stations. The month of December 1992 was spent by all hands in training related to the transition to the new airframes. Transition was completed in May 1994.

== Aircraft assignments ==
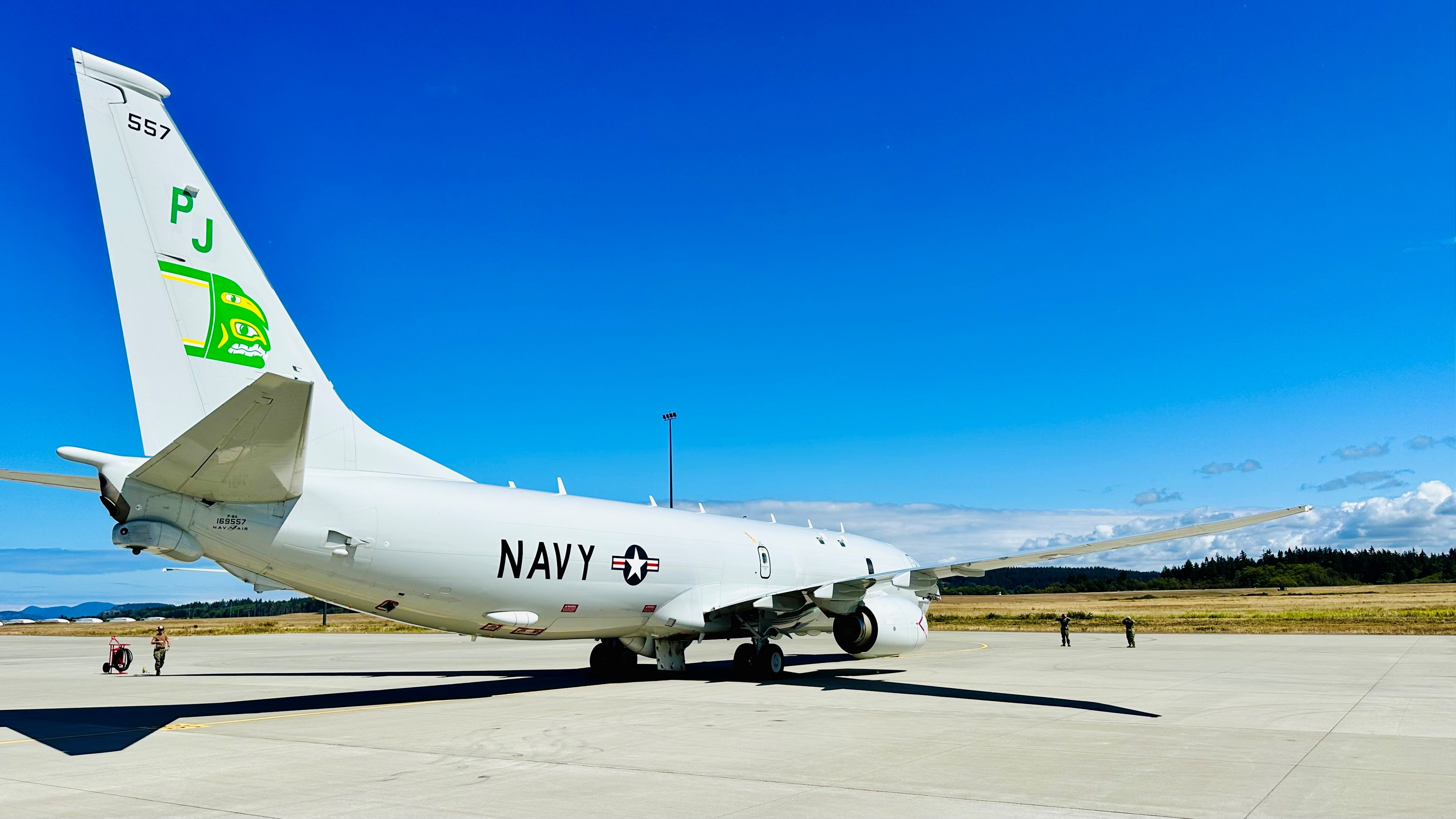
VP-69 P-8A in 2023

The squadron was assigned the following aircraft, effective on the dates shown:

- SP-2H - 1 November 1970
- P-3A DIFAR - November 1975
- P-3A TAC/NAV MOD - May 1986
- P-3B TA/CNAV MOD - January 1990
- P-3C UI - October 1992
- P-3C UIII - January 1995
- P-8A - August 2023

== Home port assignments ==
The squadron was assigned to these home ports, effective on the dates shown:

- NAS Whidbey Island, Washington - 1 November 1970

== See also ==
- Maritime patrol aircraft
- List of United States Navy aircraft squadrons
- List of inactive United States Navy aircraft squadrons
- List of squadrons in the Dictionary of American Naval Aviation Squadrons
- List of Lockheed P-3 Orion variants
- History of the United States Navy
