= VP-1 =

Patrol Squadron 1
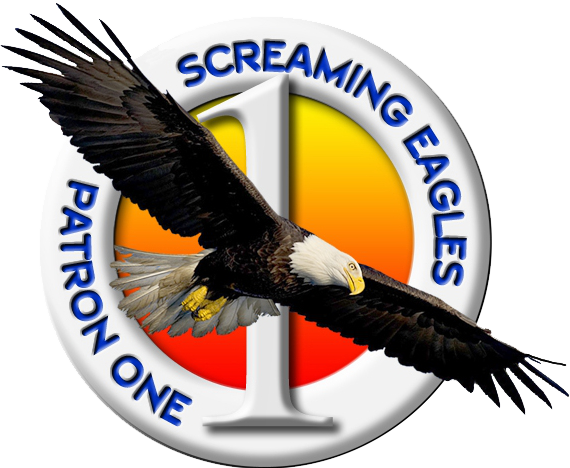
- Active: 15 February 1943 – present
- Country: United States
- Branch: United States Navy
- Type: Squadron
- Role: Anti-Submarine Patrol
- Home Port: NAS Whidbey Island
- Nicknames: Fleet's Finest (1955 - 1985); Screaming Eagles (1985 - Present)
- Mascot: Eagle
- Engagements: World War II; Korean War; Vietnam War; Desert Shield

Aircraft flown
- Patrol: PV Harpoon (1943); P-2 Neptune (1947); P-3 Orion (1969); P-8 Poseidon (2018)

Patrol Squadron One (VP-1), established 15 February 1943, is an active aviation squadron of the United States Navy operating the Boeing P-8A Poseidon aircraft from its home port at Naval Air Station Whidbey Island, Washington, United States. The squadron is known by its nickname "Screaming Eagles", adopted in 1985 replacing its previous nickname, "Fleet's Finest". The squadron went by the call sign "BACKDOOR" during the 1960s and 1970s.

== Lineage ==
The squadron was originally established as Bombing Squadron 128 (VB-128) on 15 February 1943, redesignated Patrol Bombing Squadron 128 (VPB-128) 1 October 1944, redesignated Patrol Squadron 128 (VP-128) on 15 May 1946, redesignated Medium Patrol Squadron (Landplane) 1 (VP-ML-1) on 15 November 1946 and redesignated Patrol Squadron ONE (VP-1) on 1 September 1948. It is the fifth squadron to be designated VP-1. The first VP-1 was disestablished in July 1922, the second VP-1 was disestablished on 3 May 1926, the third VP-1 was redesignated VP-21 on 1 July 1939 and the fourth VP-1 was redesignated VPB-1 on 1 October 1944.

== History ==
=== Establishment and World War II ===
Bombing Squadron One Hundred Twenty Eight (VB-128) was established at Naval Air Station DeLand, Florida on 15 February 1943 as part of the build-up of Allied aircraft engaged in the Battle of the Atlantic. Under operational control of Fleet Air Wing Twelve, the squadron took only two weeks to bring aircrew and their PV-1 Ventura aircraft to operational status, and by May the squadron was able to send a detachment of aircraft to Guantanamo Bay Naval Base to provide aerial cover for convoys while the squadron moved to Floyd Bennett Field in New York City. The squadron's first loss in action came on 7 August 1943 when a Ventura was shot down by a German U-boat it had attacked and damaged. The pilot, Lieutenant JG Frederick Cushing Cross Jr., was awarded the Navy Cross for his heroic actions in saving his crew's lives despite suffering a mortal wound. The copilot, Lieutenant JG Thomas James Aylward III., was also awarded the Navy Cross and the Distinguished Flying Cross. As the sinking U-boat returned fire, Lieutenant JG Frederick Cushing Cross Jr. received his mortal wounds. His Co-Pilot Lieutenant JG Thomas James Aylward III was shot in both legs, his right arm and received shrapnel wounds to his head and chest. The right engine of their plane exploded during the fight. Although gravely injured, and without a pilot, Lieutenant JG Aylward was able to continue the fight, sink the U-boat and complete safe water landing in the middle of the Atlantic. Lieutenant JG Thomas James Aylward III survived. The German Captain of the U-boat responsible for shooting the plane down, recounted the story to his American captors. Although impossible to verify, the U-boat captain said that a pod of porpoises pushed unconscious and injured Aylward into a life raft. Lieutenant JG Aylward spent the next 8 months in a hospital in Key West, Florida. The complete story as told by the U-boat Captain, Lieutenant JG Aylward, and members of the VB-128 is recounted in the book, "The Navy's Fliers in WWII" by Wyatt Blassingame.

Later in August, the squadron was moved into the heart of the fight by switching from coastal patrols to covering a large area of the open ocean from their new base at Reykjavík, Iceland. Now under control of Fleet Air Wing Seven, the squadron operated as part of the antisubmarine efforts in the North Atlantic Ocean, cooperating with RAF Coastal Command. On 4 October, the squadron recorded its first confirmed kill, sinking U-279 off the southwest coast of Iceland, where Lieutenant Charles L. Westhofen had spotted it on the surface and bombed it. All 48 hands aboard U-279 were lost.

December saw another change of scenery for the squadron with its relocation to San Juan, Puerto Rico under control of Fleet Air Wing Eleven. The squadron's aircraft were refitted with rockets and training undergone in the use of them against surface targets. Upon completion of training, the squadron moved to Ensenada Honda, Puerto Rico and mounted routine anti-submarine patrols throughout May 1944. With the reduction of the German submarine threat in 1944, the squadron had time for leave and training before being transferred to the Pacific for service in the Pacific War, first arriving at Naval Air Station Alameda, California on 26 September and then at Naval Air Station Kaneohe, Hawaii on 6 October. Training was undertaken in Hawaii with routine rotations to Midway Island for weather patrols. Ultimately, the squadron was moved to Owi Airfield, Papua on 21 December and by 3 January 1945, its aircraft were transferred to other squadrons to bring them up to strength.

The squadron, now designated Patrol Bombing Squadron One Hundred Twenty Eight (VPB-128) received new aircraft on 28 February 1945 at Guiuan, Samar, Philippines, from which the squadron began operating daily anti-shipping and convoy protection patrols. A pair of squadron aircraft recorded the first kills against the Japanese on 18 March when one midget submarine was sunk and another was damaged in Davao Gulf. Four days later, a strike against the wharf in Cebu City netted another midget submarine sinking by rockets, though one of the attacking aircraft was hit by antiaircraft fire and lost with all crew members. At the end of the month, the squadron relocated to Tacloban, Leyte, and then on to Puerto Princesa, Palawan, continuing with its primary responsibilities of anti-shipping and convoy coverage.

At the end of April, the squadron switched to supporting ground operations and began striking land targets selected by the United States Army, including Itu Aba Island, Brooketon, Brunei, Kudat, Seria, and Tagai Town. During this period, the Navy changed its policy on patrol squadron designations, and the designation was changed to Patrol Squadron One Hundred Twenty Eight (VP-128) in May. On 21 June 1945, the squadron was transferred to the operational control of Fleet Air Wing One and relocated to NAB Tinian resuming its traditional role of sea patrol. It conducted such patrols daily until the surrender of Japanese forces, though it later undertook regular weather patrols. The squadron was moved to Okinawa, Japan and redesignated Medium Patrol Squadron (Landplane) One (VP-ML-1) before finally returning to the United States in March 1947.

=== A new home at Whidbey ===
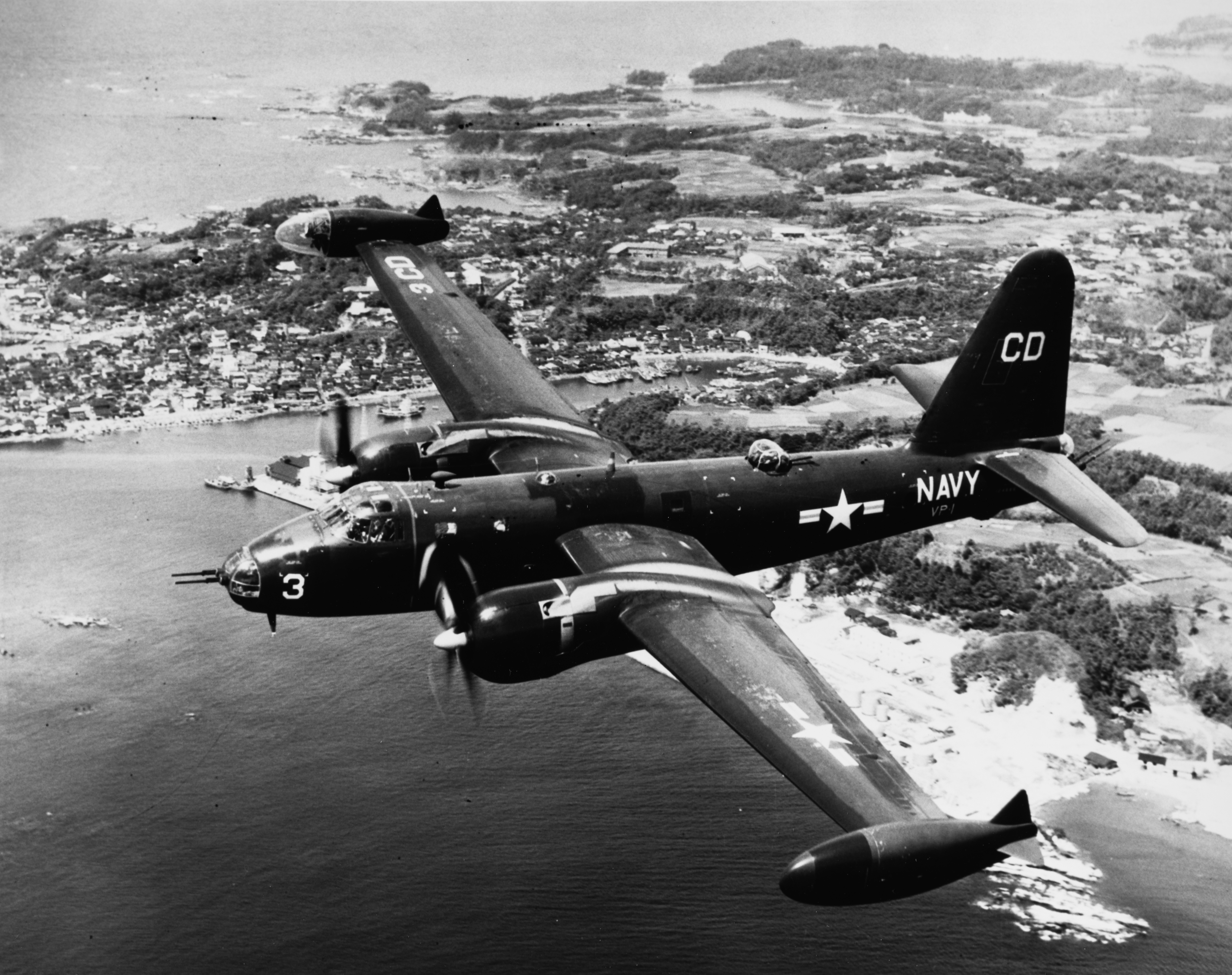
P2V-5 Neptune in flight over Japan

The squadron's first home port upon its return to the States was Naval Air Station San Diego, California where it underwent transition to the new P2V Neptune aircraft. With transition complete, the squadron was permanently assigned to Naval Air Station Whidbey Island, Washington, on 13 January 1948. That same year it would receive its final redesignation as Patrol Squadron One. The first deployment from its new home was in support of American military forces engaged in South Korea with a detachment sent on 7 August 1950 to Naha Air Force Base, Okinawa. Combat operations commenced on 19 August patrolling sea lanes in the Formosa Straits in an attempt to interdict supply vessels. By the end of the conflict, the squadron conducted four deployments to Naha.

In the mid-1950s, the Navy was under considerable pressure to cutback on land-based patrol aircraft in the wake of the Korean War and the United States Air Force was making demands to control all of America's land-based military aircraft. To face these challenges, the Navy needed to demonstrate the ability to quickly deploy the Neptune aircraft in squadron strength to any part of the globe, and VP-1 was tasked with making this demonstration. On 21 April 1955, the entire squadron departed on what would become the first around-the-world flight by a patrol squadron, returning to Whidbey Island on 5 May. Together with the Navy's record-setting effort of the Truculent Turtle, the Navy was able to demonstrate the value of its Neptune fleet and preserve support for the patrol aviation community. Operational activity included a deployment to Kwajalein for Operation Redwing, during which the squadron conducted radiation monitoring flights following nuclear testing.

=== Service in Vietnam ===
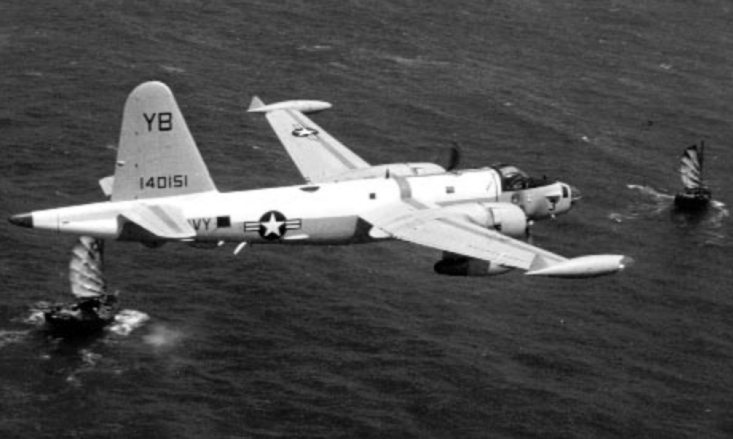
SP-2H Neptune patrolling the waters off Vietnam

VP-1 was again called upon for operational service as the conflict in Vietnam ramped up. On 7 October 1964, the squadron deployed to Marine Corps Air Station Iwakuni, Japan from which it mounted antisubmarine patrols and reported on Communist shipping in the Gulf of Tonkin. Closer in, a detachment was deployed to Tan Son Nhut and Da Nang, Vietnam. This first deployment to Vietnam was concluded with the squadron's return to Whidbey Island on 1 April 1965. A second deployment was made on 13 February 1966, replacing Patrol Squadron 22 at Iwakumi and deploying a detachment of seven aircraft to Tan Son Nhut. These aircraft participated in Operation Market Time, a joint United States – South Vietnam effort begun on 11 March 1965, by mounting coastal patrols aimed at stopping supply of equipment and munitions to the North Vietnamese by sea. VP-1 was the first patrol squadron to suffer casualties in Vietnam with one person killed and five wounded during an attack on Tan Son Nhut on 13 April 1966. Five of the squadron's aircraft were damaged as well during the action.

The squadron's third Vietnam deployment was out of Naval Air Station Sangley Point in Cavite, Philippines with a forward detachment becoming the first to operate full-time from the recently completed Naval Air Facility Cam Ranh in Vietnam. This 1967 deployment was followed by another rotation the following year using the same facilities, but in 1970, the squadron's return to the West Pacific was back at Iwakuni and several detachments were supported, including to the previously utilized Cam Ranh and Tan Son Nhut air bases as well as a new detachment to U-Tapao Royal Thai Navy Airfield in Thailand. The squadron returned to Sangley Point for its 1971 deployment, but had to move to Naval Air Station Cubi Point, also in the Philippines, as Sangley Point was shut down in May. VP-1 thus became the first patrol squadron to operate from the new Cubi Point facility. The squadron's final Vietnam combat deployment was to Cubi Point in 1972 with a six aircraft detachment at U-Tapao.

In 1980, the squadron deployed to Cubi Point again with a three aircraft detachment at Naval Air Station Diego Garcia in the Indian Ocean. While the Vietnam War had ended several years prior, the squadron was heavily involved in search and rescue efforts for Vietnamese boat people. The squadron would end up being involved in the rescue of more than 4,000 people, earning its receipt of the Humanitarian Service Medal.

=== Changes in equipment and basing ===
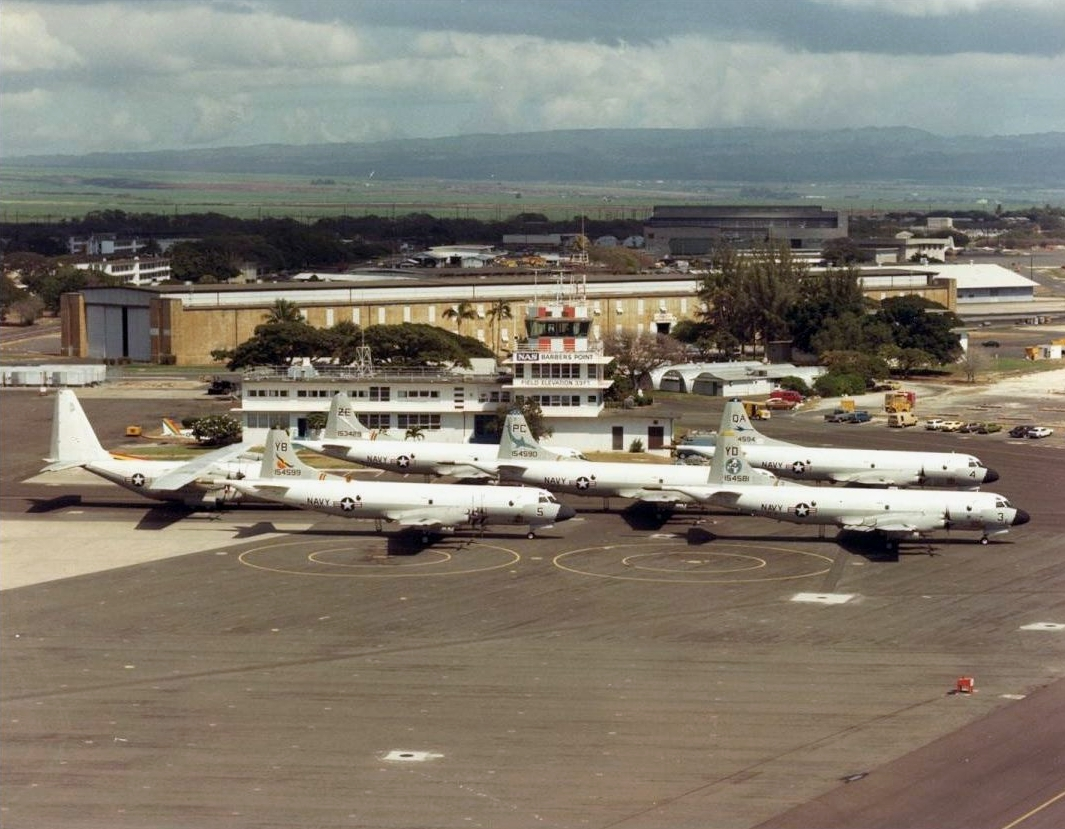
A VP-1 P-3B Orion with other aircraft of PatWing 2 at Barbers Point

After more than twenty years of operating the P-2 Neptune, the squadron began receiving P-3B Orion aircraft to replace its aging SP-2H fleet in July 1969. VP-1 was the last fleet squadron to still operate the Neptune, and as the transition was completed by 1 October 1969, it retired the P-2 from frontline service with the United States Navy. At that point, VP-1 also found itself as the last patrol squadron based at Whidbey Island. A congressional review of force structure and bases was made in 1969 as the increasing costs of the war in Vietnam put pressure on the services to find cost reductions. VP-1 found itself in a tenuous position as the sole Whidbey-based patrol squadron and still in transition to the new P-3 aircraft. As such, in October 1969 it was nominated for deactivation and placed in stand-down, limiting the flow of personnel to the squadron. By December, however, the Chief of Naval Operations had determined to keep VP-1 operational, though to relocate it to Naval Air Station Barbers Point in Hawaii where it would join other Orion-equipped squadrons.

The Orion continued to be upgraded throughout its service life, and VP-1 marked the final transition for several technologies during the 1970s. Not only had the squadron been the last to transition from the P-2, but its P-3B aircraft were not equipped with Directional Low Frequency Analysis and Recording (DIFAR) gear until the unit's final deployment to Vietnam. The squadron's deployment to Naval Air Station Agana in Guam in December 1976 marked the last time an active fleet squadron would deploy with the baseline P-3B to the Western Pacific. In July 1978, crews from VP-1 were the last to fire AGM-12 Bullpup missiles in exercises before removal of the missile from Navy inventory the following month. The following year, the squadron was deployed temporarily to Naval Air Station Moffett Field in California as they transitioned to the P-3B TAC/NAV MOD version of the Orion. This aircraft had significant improvements in power and avionics, replacing the final baseline P-3B in January 1980.

Further modification of the squadron's aircraft was undertaken in 1982 with implementation of Infra-Red Detection System/Harpoon Airborne Command and Launch Subsystem (IRDS/HACLS) which added the ability to detect targets using infrared sensors and allowing the aircraft to carry and launch Harpoon missiles. These modifications were undertaken at Naval Air Station Alameda in California. The P-3B was finally replaced by the much more capable P-3C MOD, with the first such aircraft being transferred from Patrol Squadron 30 in October 1984. While the P-3C MOD was not the most advanced model of the P-3C in Navy service at the time, the airframes received by the squadron did include a number of retrofits, giving them features of the newer production aircraft. VP-1 received actual P-3C Update III aircraft in February 1991, with training on the new equipment done at Moffett Field on a rotational basis until completed in July of that year.

=== End of the Cold War ===
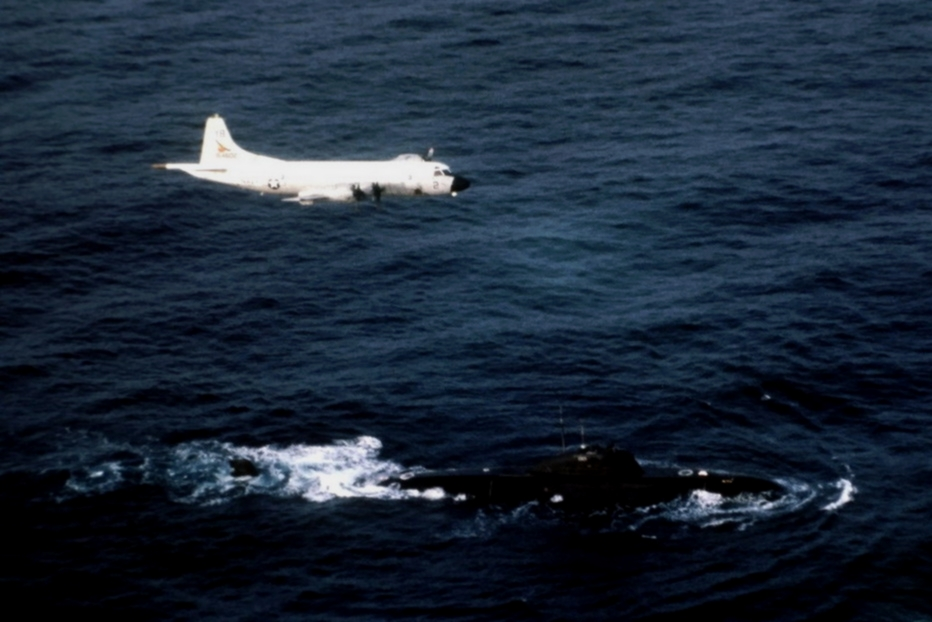
P-3B passing over a Soviet submarine

Patrol Squadron 1's detachment to Diego Garcia in 1980 provided support during the Iranian hostage crisis, earning the Navy Expeditionary Medal. The squadron would later play host to a Japanese Maritime Self Defense Force deployment at Barber's Point in July 1983, providing maintenance and administrative support for their guests as they engaged in a month of joint training. Into the 1980s, VP-1 retained a proud record of safe operations, having amassed over 100,000 flight hours without an accident by 1983. Unfortunately this ended with a pair of accidents that year, one of which resulted in the death of fourteen aircrew. The subsequent investigation into these incidents resulted in the sacking of both commanding and executive officers of the squadron.

Iraq's invasion of Kuwait on 2 August 1990 drew an immediate response by the United States to defend Saudi Arabia and prepare to eject Iraq from Kuwait. On the 11th, VP-1 received orders to deploy to Diego Garcia in support of these efforts and were deployed there within 72 hours. A four aircraft detachment was deployed to RAFO Masirah, Oman along with a two aircraft detachment further forward to Jeddah, Saudi Arabia. These aircraft operated in the Persian Gulf to monitor shipping and maintain vigilance should the Iraqi Navy attempt to sortie into the Persian Gulf. No significant Iraqi attempt was made however, and the squadron's deployment was completed without incident.

During the 1990s, the squadron made several dispersed deployments. In 1990, the squadron supplied a pair of aircraft to the Joint Task Force in Panama Law Enforcement Operations in Central America. These aircraft completed a pair of deployments in June/July and October/November 1991 operating from Howard Air Force Base in the Panama Canal Zone. The aircraft supported drug interdiction efforts in Central America as part of the follow-up to Operation Just Cause. In 1992, a third detachment to Howard AFB was made by the squadron for counter-narcotics operations, though this detachment also operated from Pie de la Cuesta, Guerrero, Mexico, making it the first patrol squadron of the US Navy to operate from the Mexican Air Force facility. Other deployment locations in the 1990s included Naval Air Station Adak and Eielson Air Force Base in Alaska and Naval Air Facility Kadena and Misawa Air Force Base in Japan, as well as deployments to Guam, Indonesia, Malaysia, Oman, Singapore, South Korea, and Thailand. During their 1996 deployment to the Indian Ocean, the squadron participated in a pair of search and rescue missions to assist foreign vessels in distress. Combat operations included escort and patrol as part of Operation Desert Strike in September 1996, and the first patrol aircraft missions in the Persian Gulf to carry AGM-65 Maverick missiles, carried out in November.

=== Post-Cold War support ===
A further performance enhancement came with the squadron's transition to the P-3C AIP version of the Orion in the late 1990s. VP-1 successfully deployed with this aircraft to the Persian Gulf from June to December 1999, operating it from Diego Garcia, Masirah, Manama, Bahrain, and Doha, Qatar. Quite unusually, the squadron deployed a pair of aircraft to support NATO's Kosovo Force with armed flights in the Adriatic Sea. The following year, back at home, the squadron participated in RIMPAC, a multi-national exercise in the Pacific Ocean, while preparing crews on the AIP aircraft. The squadron's next deployment came in 2001, and in addition to normal antisubmarine warfare missions, the squadron was active in the search and role efforts in several exercises. These included participation in the Hong Kong Search and Rescue Exercise and the Maritime Sea-Surveillance Exercise. The latter was the first trilateral exercise involving the Philippines, Thailand, and the United States. Antisubmarine exercises included work with the Republic of Singapore Navy, Royal Australian Navy (Operation Tandem Thrust), the Royal Thai Navy (Operation Cobra Gold), and USS Kitty Hawk battle group and USS Essex (LHD-2) amphibious readiness group.

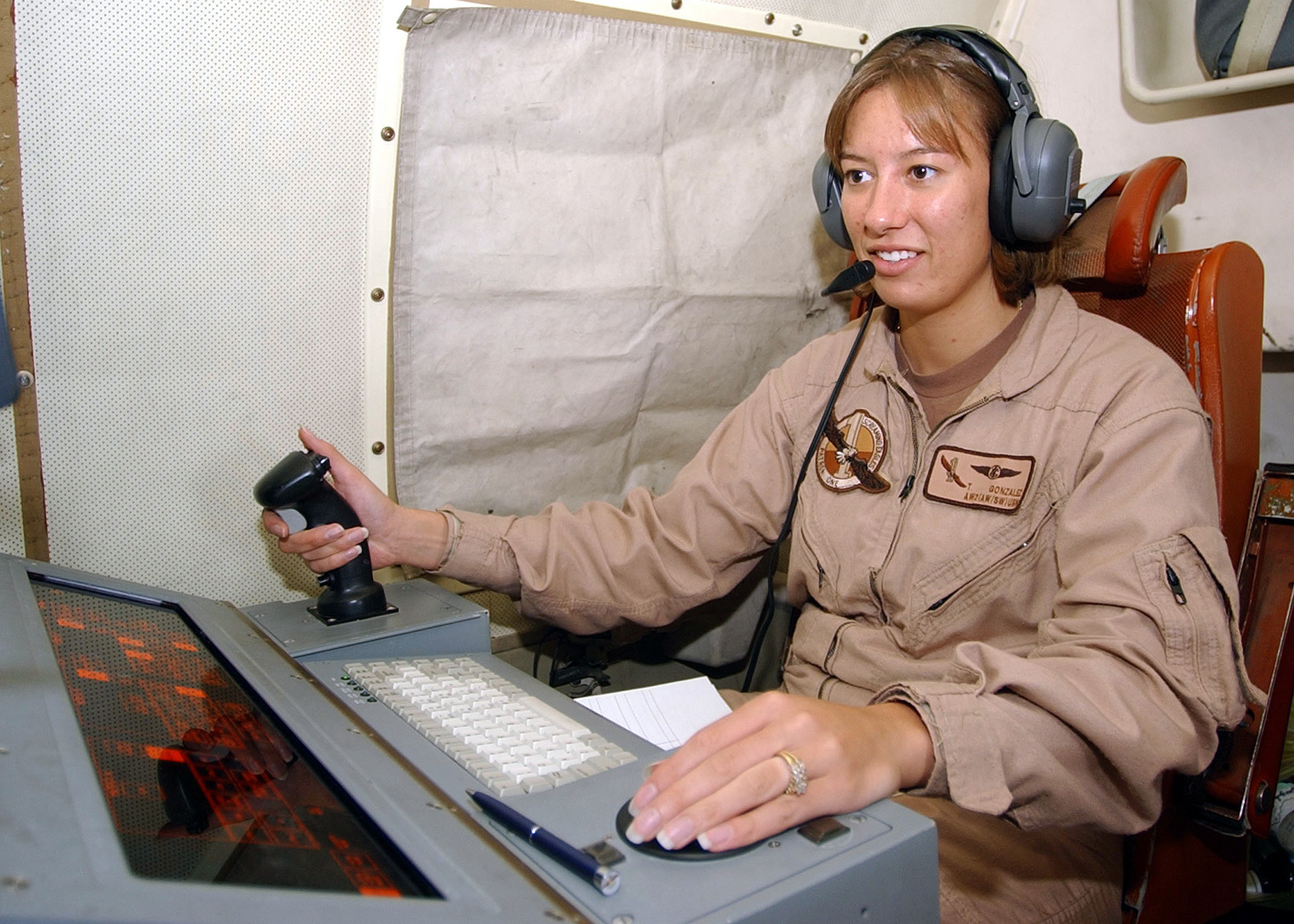
A P-3C Orion crew member during Operation Enduring Freedom

Deployed to Diego Garcia again from June 2001 to June 2002, the squadron operated in support of Fifth and Sixth Fleet areas, operating detachments in Manama and Masirah. During this deployment the squadron flew more than 6000 hours in support of Operation Enduring Freedom and Operation Southern Watch without incident in close cooperation with all branches of the United States military as well as several foreign air forces. Returning home, VP-1 completed a successful inter-deployment training cycle (IDRC) before a six-month deployment to the Western Pacific began in December 2003. Operating as part of Seventh Fleet, the squadron operated primarily from Misawa and Kadena in addition to smaller operations from six other airfields as they took part in a number of international exercises, including locations in Australia, Guam, the Philippines, South Korea, Singapore, and Thailand. More than 3000 hours were compiled during the deployment.

The squadron repeated its Japanese deployment in December 2005 on the heels of winning the Arnold J. Isbell award for ASW excellence during their IDRC. During the deployment's 4700 flight hours, they participated in exercises with the Japanese Maritime Self Defense Force, operated with five major US Navy groups, and deployed detachments to Australia, Brunei, Guam, the Marshall Islands, the Philippines, Singapore, South Korea, and Thailand. Upon their arrival, the squadron celebrated 135,000 hours without a mishap, a feat extending over 23 years of operations. They participated after their return in RIMPAC 2006 and Mojave Viper exercises and supported the USS John C. Stennis, USS Nimitz, and USS Bonhomme Richard groups. Several aircraft from the squadron returned to the Middle East in 2007 in support of Operations Enduring Freedom and Iraqi Freedom, while exercises such as Empire Challenge and Valiant Shield helped the rest of the squadron ready themselves for deployment and demonstrate further capabilities of their aircrews and aircraft.

Deployed to Kadena in November 2007, VP-1 aircraft additionally were detached to Misawa and the Philippines. After exercises with the Royal Australian Navy (TAMEX) and the Republic of Korea Navy (LINKEX), the squadron was cut to only four operational aircraft as the Navy's Red Stripe program came into effect, withdrawing operational P-3 aircraft for overhaul. This reduced complement did not excuse the squadron from its operational commitment, and the unit was able to uphold its participation in further exercises including Snapdragon Red, Distant Thunder, CMPOP, and Cobra Gold, as well as detachments to Guam and Thailand before returning home in 2008.

Patrol Squadron 1 detached a pair of aircrews in January 2013 to Kaneohe Bay for participation in Undersea Warfare Exercise 13-1. The crews worked in cooperation with both fellow American forces as well as the Royal Canadian Air Force.

By May 2019 VP-1 had completed the transition to the P-8 Poseidon

=== Designations, assignments, and aircraft ===
Designations, home ports, command assignments, and aircraft of Patrol Squadron One
Date	Designation	Home Port	Assignment	Aircraft
1943 February 15	Bombing Squadron ONE HUNDRED TWENTY EIGHT (VB-128)	DeLand, Florida	Fleet Air Wing Twelve	PV-1 Ventura
1943 May 17	Bombing Squadron ONE HUNDRED TWENTY EIGHT (VB-128)	(New York (state)) Floyd Bennett Field, New York	Fleet Air Wing Nine	PV-1 Ventura
1943 August 23	Bombing Squadron ONE HUNDRED TWENTY EIGHT (VB-128)	(New York (state)) Floyd Bennett Field, New York	Fleet Air Wing Seven	PV-1 Ventura
1943 December 19	Bombing Squadron ONE HUNDRED TWENTY EIGHT (VB-128)	(New York (state)) Floyd Bennett Field, New York	Fleet Air Wing Eleven	PV-1 Ventura
1944 October 1	Patrol Bombing Squadron ONE HUNDRED TWENTY EIGHT (VPB-128)	(New York (state)) Floyd Bennett Field, New York	Fleet Air Wing Eleven	PV-1 Ventura
1944 October 6	Patrol Bombing Squadron ONE HUNDRED TWENTY EIGHT (VPB-128)	NAS Kaneohe, Hawaii	Fleet Air Wing One	PV-1 Ventura
1944 December 21	Patrol Bombing Squadron ONE HUNDRED TWENTY EIGHT (VPB-128)	NAS Kaneohe, Hawaii	Fleet Air Wing Seventeen	PV-1 Ventura
1945 June 21	Patrol Bombing Squadron ONE HUNDRED TWENTY EIGHT (VPB-128)	Tinian Island, Northern Mariana Islands	Fleet Air Wing Seventeen	PV-1 Ventura
1946 May 15	Patrol Squadron ONE HUNDRED TWENTY EIGHT (VP-128)	(Japan) Naha Air Base, Okinawa	Fleet Air Wing Seventeen	PV-1 Ventura
1946 November 7	Patrol Squadron ONE HUNDRED TWENTY EIGHT (VP-128)	(Japan) Naha Air Base, Okinawa	Fleet Air Wing One	PV-2 Harpoon
1946 November 15	Medium Patrol Squadron (Landplane) ONE (VP-ML-1)	(Japan) Naha Air Base, Okinawa	Fleet Air Wing One	PV-2 Harpoon
1947 March	Medium Patrol Squadron (Landplane) ONE (VP-ML-1)	(Japan) Naha Air Base, Okinawa	Fleet Air Wing Fourteen	P2V-2 Neptune
1948 January 13	Medium Patrol Squadron (Landplane) ONE (VP-ML-1)	(Washington (state)) NAS Whidbey Island, Washington	Fleet Air Wing Four	P2V-2 Neptune
1948 September 1	Patrol Squadron ONE (VP-1)	(Washington (state)) NAS Whidbey Island, Washington	Fleet Air Wing Four	P2V-2 Neptune
1950 July	Patrol Squadron ONE (VP-1)	(Washington (state)) NAS Whidbey Island, Washington	Fleet Air Wing Four	P2V-3 Neptune
1953 May	Patrol Squadron ONE (VP-1)	(Washington (state)) NAS Whidbey Island, Washington	Fleet Air Wing Four	P2V-5 Neptune
1957	Patrol Squadron ONE (VP-1)	(Washington (state)) NAS Whidbey Island, Washington	Fleet Air Wing Four	P2V-5F Neptune
1959 August	Patrol Squadron ONE (VP-1)	(Washington (state)) NAS Whidbey Island, Washington	Fleet Air Wing Four	P2V-7 Neptune
1963 August	Patrol Squadron ONE (VP-1)	(Washington (state)) NAS Whidbey Island, Washington	Fleet Air Wing Four	SP-2H Neptune
1969 July	Patrol Squadron ONE (VP-1)	(Washington (state)) NAS Whidbey Island, Washington	Fleet Air Wing Four	P-3B Orion
1970 June 30	Patrol Squadron ONE (VP-1)	NAS Barbers Point, Hawaii	Patrol Wing Two	P-3B Orion
1979 November	Patrol Squadron ONE (VP-1)	NAS Barbers Point, Hawaii	Patrol Wing Two	P-3B MOD Orion
1984 October	Patrol Squadron ONE (VP-1)	NAS Barbers Point, Hawaii	Patrol Wing Two	P-3C MOD Orion
1991 February	Patrol Squadron ONE (VP-1)	NAS Barbers Point, Hawaii	Patrol Wing Two	P-3C Update IIIR Orion
1995 July	Patrol Squadron ONE (VP-1)	(Washington (state)) NAS Whidbey Island, Washington	Patrol Wing Ten	P-3C Update IIIR Orion
1999 June 1	Patrol Squadron ONE (VP-1)	(Washington (state)) NAS Whidbey Island, Washington	Patrol and Reconnaissance Wing Ten	P-3C Update IIIR Orion

== Awards ==
Patrol Squadron One has been recognized with the following awards during its establishment:

Unit Awards received by Patrol Squadron One
Ribbon	Award	Dates	Notes
	Navy Unit Commendation	1 January 1967 – 14 May 1967	
	Navy Unit Commendation	16 November 1967 – 31 March 1968	
	Navy Unit Commendation	2 August 1990 – 1 November 1990	
	Meritorious Unit Commendation	15 May 1967 – 15 November 1967	
	Meritorious Unit Commendation	20 April 1970 – 1 August 1970	
	Meritorious Unit Commendation	1 April 1971 – 20 April 1971	
	Meritorious Unit Commendation	28 August 1982 – 7 September 1982	
	Meritorious Unit Commendation	10 June 1988 – 10 December 1988	
	Meritorious Unit Commendation	20 April 1970 – 1 August 1970	selected crews only
	Meritorious Unit Commendation	1 April 1971 – 20 April 1971	
	Gallantry Cross	13 May 1967 – 5 November 1967	awarded by the government of the Republic of Vietnam
	Gallantry Cross	1 August 1968 – 1 March 1969	
	Vietnam Service Medal	7 February 1966 – 2 June 1966	
	Armed Forces Expeditionary Medal	28 March 1952 – 30 April 1952	
	Armed Forces Expeditionary Medal	1 May 1952 – 3 October 1952	
	Armed Forces Expeditionary Medal	20 May 1980 – 10 November 1980	select crews
	Armed Forces Expeditionary Medal	5 August 1981 – 20 October 1981	Guam Detachment
	Navy Occupation Service Medal	15 November 1946 – 7 November 1947	
	Navy Occupation Service Medal	1 August 1950 – 7 November 1950	
	Navy Occupation Service Medal	12 May 1951 – 23 July 1951	
	Southwest Asia Service Medal	14 August 1990 – 19 November 1990	
	Humanitarian Service Medal	9 May 1980 – 10 November 1980	For assistance in rescuing more than 4,000 refugees

== Incidents ==
- 7 August 1943: A PV-1 Ventura was shot down by a German submarine's antiaircraft fire in the Atlantic Ocean about 300 miles off the coast of Virginia. The aircraft had spotted and attacked the submarine, damaging it in the attack.
- 22 March 1945: A PV-1 Ventura piloted by Lieutenant Tepuni was shot down by Japanese antiaircraft fire during an attack on Japanese naval facilities in Cebu City, Philippines. The aircraft had been involved in rocket attacks which sunk a midget submarine. The PV-1 was lost with all hands.
- 3 January 1953: A P2V Neptune crashed off the coast of Washington. Four of the crew survived, one was lost.
- 13 April 1966: Five P-2 Neptune aircraft were damaged on the ground at Tan Son Nhut Air Base during attacks by Communist forces. The squadron suffered one killed and five wounded in the attack.
- 15 December 1967: SP-2H Neptune aircraft coded YB-2 crashed in the Pacific Ocean off the coast of Alaska. The aircraft was engaged in tracking Soviet submarines. No trace of aircraft or crew was found.
- 17 May 1983: P-3B Orion BuNo. 152733 made a belly landing at Naval Air Station Barbers Point, Hawaii.
- 16 June 1983: P-3B Orion BuNo. 152720 crashed into a mountain in Kauai, Hawaii. All fourteen people on the aircraft were killed.

== See also ==
- List of United States Navy aircraft squadrons
- List of squadrons in the Dictionary of American Naval Aviation Squadrons
