= VAQ-140 =

Electromagnetic Attack Squadron 140
- Active: 1 October 1985
- Country: United States
- Branch: United States Navy
- Type: Electromagnetic Attack
- Role: Electromagnetic Warfare
- Part of: Carrier Air Wing Seven
- Garrison/HQ: NAS Whidbey Island
- Nickname: "Patriots"
- Mascot: Eagle

Aircraft flown
- Attack: EA-6B Prowler; EA-18G Growler

Electromagnetic Attack Squadron ONE FOUR ZERO (VAQ-140) is a US Navy electromagnetic attack squadron. Known as the "Patriots", the squadron operates the EA-18G Growler. The squadron is home ported at NAS Whidbey Island, Washington. They are attached to Carrier Air Wing Seven, and deploy aboard USS George H W Bush. The squadron's radio callsign is "Talon" and are formally recognized as America's Squadron. Their mascot is their newest aircrew dressing as Evel Knievel.

== History ==
The squadron was established on 1 October 1985, and immediately tasked with the evaluation and testing of the AGM-88 High-speed Anti-Radiation Missile (HARM), and became the first Prowler squadron to operationally deploy with HARM aboard USS John F. Kennedy in August 1986. The squadron was deployed aboard USS Dwight D. Eisenhower for the beginning of Operation Desert Shield in September 1990. The squadron returned to the Persian Gulf aboard the Eisenhower for Operation Southern Watch.

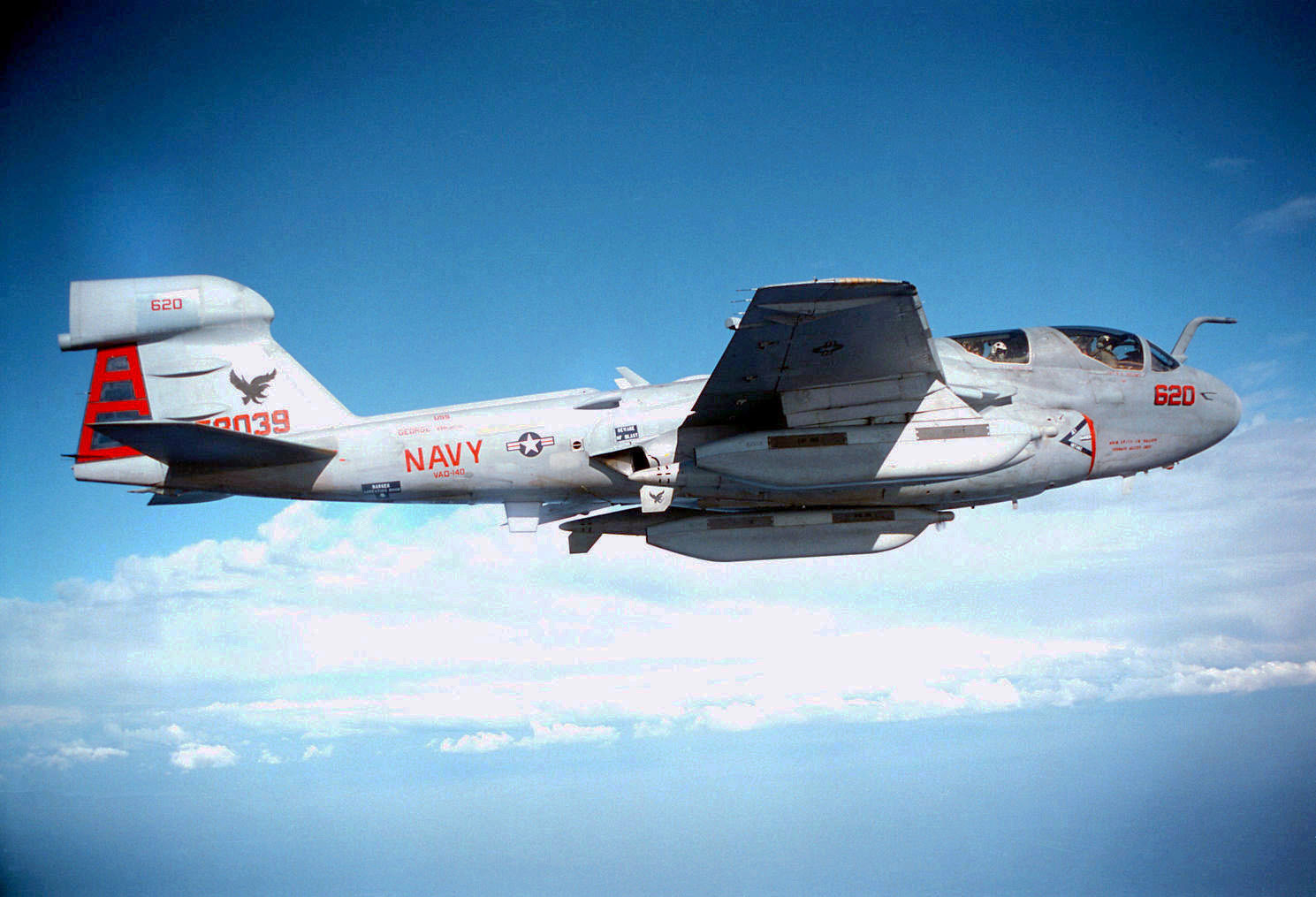
VAQ-140 EA-6B Prowler over Bosnia and Herzegovina in 1995

May 1994 the squadron deploy aboard USS George Washington to participate in the 50th D-Day Anniversary, and support Operation Southern Watch in Iraq, as well as Operations Deny Flight and Sharp Guard in Bosnia. The squadron earned the Battle “E” for their efforts. The squadron took their first Expeditionary role supporting combat operations over the Balkans with the 31st Air Expeditionary Wing out of Aviano Air Base, Italy.

In 1999, in support of the NATO bombing of Yugoslavia, they assumed command of Electronic Attack Wing Aviano, which consisted of 100 aircrew and 300 support personnel. While flying over 740 combat missions and 3300 flight hours, 117 HARM were fired against the enemy, earning the squadron a Navy Unit Commendation Medal.

The Patriots returned to their first ship, USS John F. Kennedy, for another combat deployment in 2002, during which the Patriots detached to Al Udeid Air Base in Qatar, and achieved a 100% combat sortie completion rate.

VAQ-140 again deployed aboard George Washington in January 2004 supporting the Iraq War with another 100% sortie completion rate.

In May 2005 the squadron deployed to MCAS Iwakuni Japan, and earning the CNO Safety "S" for 2004.

In 2006 the squadron begin an eight-month extended deployment with half of the squadron operating out of Al Asad Airbase, Iraq, and half the squadron operating off of Dwight D. Eisenhower.

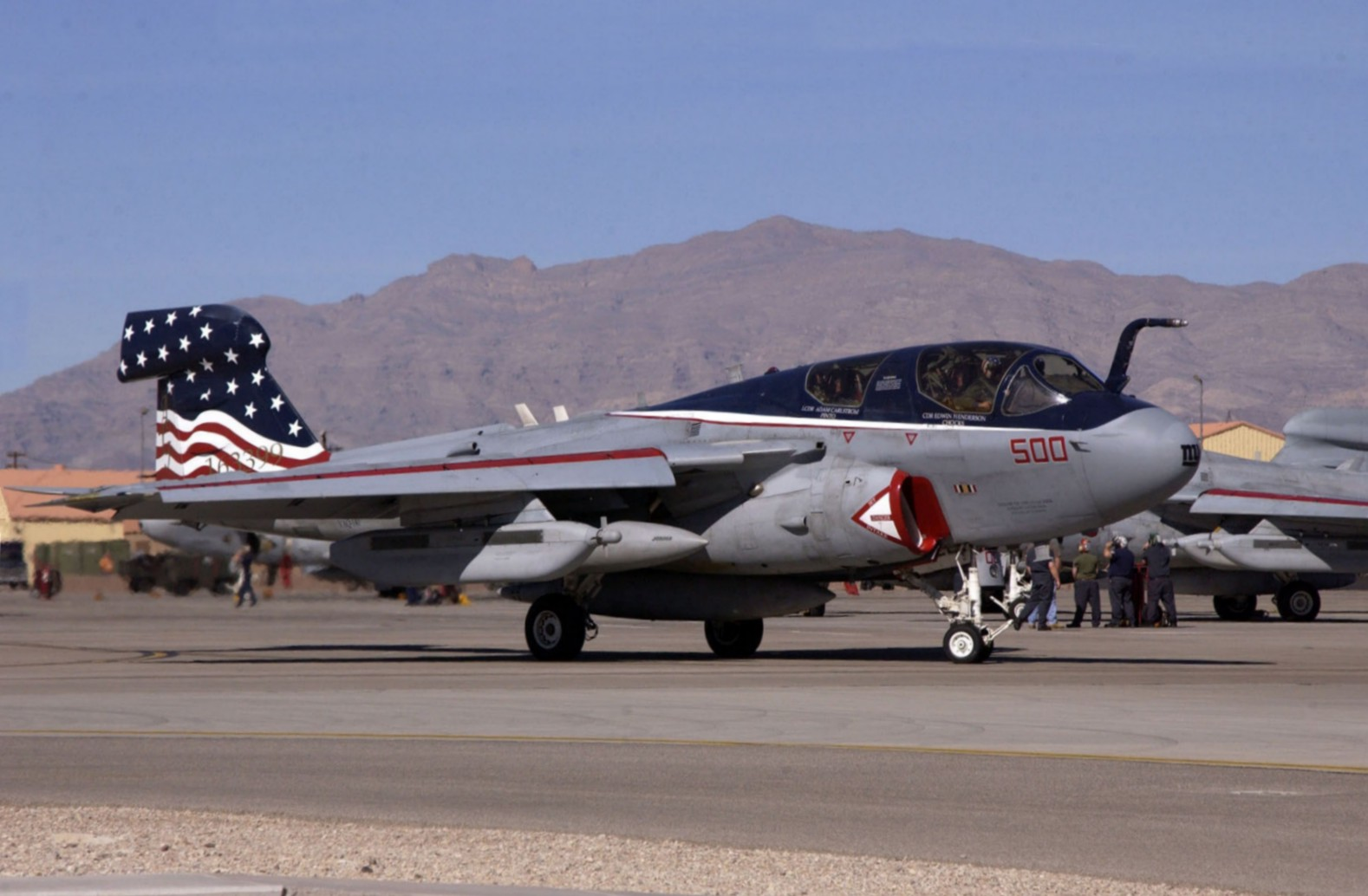
VAQ-140 EA-6B Prowler at Nellis Air Force Base in 2008

In April 2008, the squadron received the first of four ICAP III Prowlers, greatly enhancing their capabilities through new software and weapon systems. After a successful work-up period, the squadron deployed in February 2009 aboard Dwight D. Eisenhower in support of Operation Enduring Freedom, flying over 143 sorties and 918 combat hours. The squadron again deployed in January 2010 in support of Enduring Freedom, earning them the Battle "E".

In mid-2011 the squadron returned to Aviano Air Base in support of Operation Unified Protector, and NATO operations over Libya. Throughout this deployment, the squadron maintained a 100% sortie completion rate while compiling 164 sorties and 1086 combat hours.

Following their return to NAS Whidbey Island, the squadron embarked on a pre-deployment workup schedule, which saw the squadron conduct a detachment to Naval Air Station Fallon for Airwing Fallon, and three detachments to Dwight D. Eisenhower for TSTA and COMPUTEX. At the conclusion of their workup cycle, the squadron embarked on a six- and a five-month deployment with a two-month break back in Whidbey in support of Operation Enduring Freedom and maritime security operations in the 5th Fleet Area of Responsibility. These cruises marked the last time the squadron would deploy with the EA-6B Prowler. During 2012, the squadron was awarded the Medical Blue "M", the Safety "S", the Golden Wrench, the Battle "E" and the Radford award.

The squadron completed transition to the EA-18G Growler in July 2014.

The squadron deployed aboard USS Harry S. Truman from November 2015 to July 2016 conducting combat operation in Iraq and Syria in support of Operation Inherent Resolve.

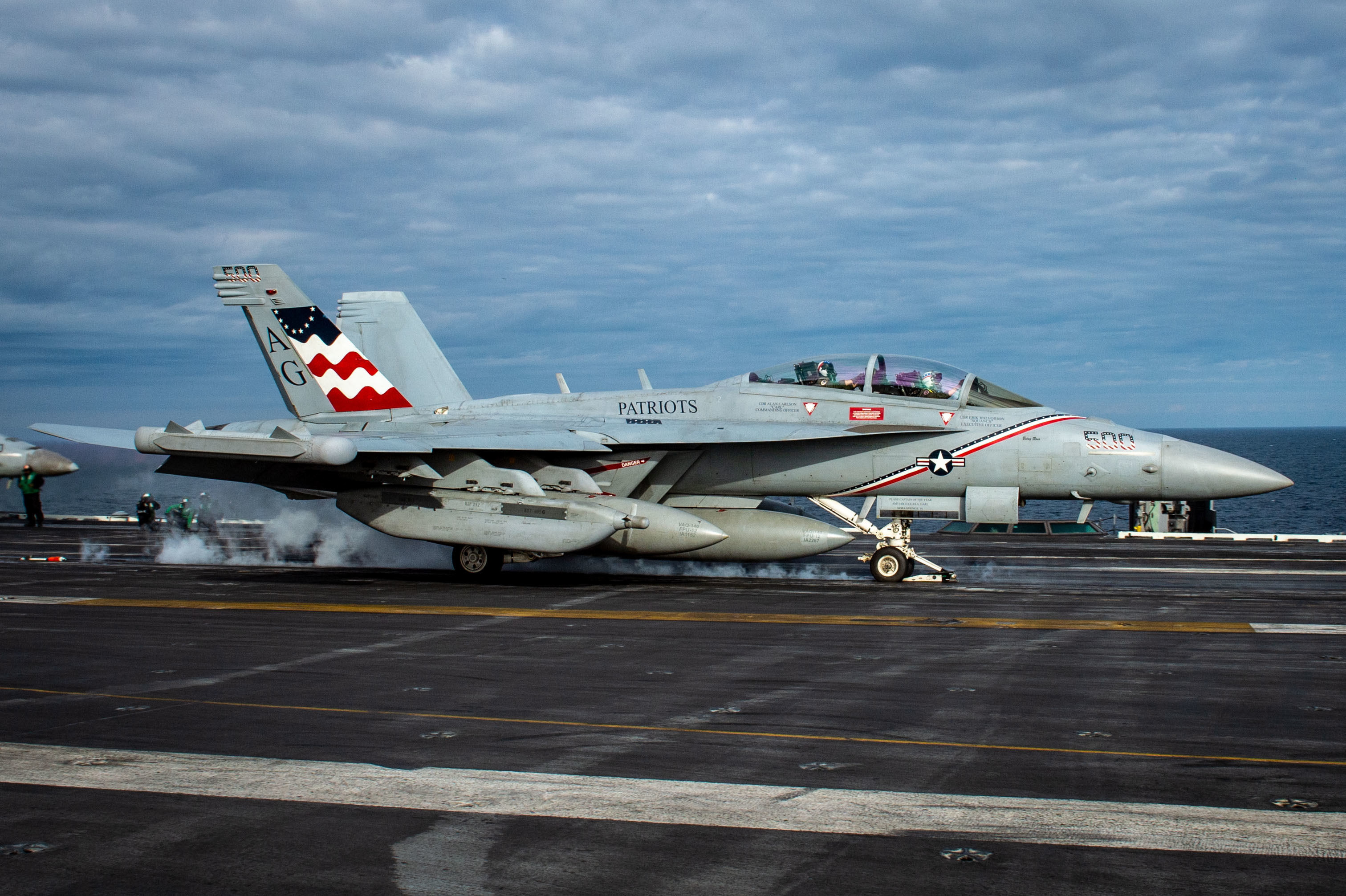
VAQ-140 EA-18G launching from USS George H.W. Bush in 2023

The squadron deployed aboard USS LINCOLN CVN-72 for an extended deployment dubbed "The Endless Bummer" to ease the tension with Iran.

The squadron deployed aboard the USS George H.W. Bush (CVN-77) from August 2022 to April 2023 to the 6th Fleet Area of Responsibility, a deployment colloquially dubbed " The Mediterranean Pleasure Cruise."

In April of 2024, the squadron deployed aboard the USS George Washington (CVN-73) to take the ship from Norfolk, Virginia to San Diego, California to prepare the ship for its transition back into the 7th Fleet Area of Responsibility. The deployment took the ship and the squadron around both coasts of South America, using the Strait of Magellan to cross from the Atlantic Ocean into the Pacific Ocean.

In late April 2026, VAQ-140, as part of CVW 7 onboard the George H. W. Bush entered the CENTCOM AOR. VFA-140’s E/A-18Gs began combat operations against Iran and undertook naval blockade sorties within Operation Epic Fury.

== See also ==
- History of the United States Navy
- List of United States Navy aircraft squadrons
