= Naval Air Force Reserve =

Naval aviation component of the U.S. Navy Reserve

- Active: 29 August 1916 – present (110 years, 2 months)
- Country: United States
- Branch: United States Navy
- Part of: United States Navy Reserve
- Garrison/HQ: Naval Air Station North Island, California

Commanders
- Current commander: RDML John D. Saccomando

Insignia
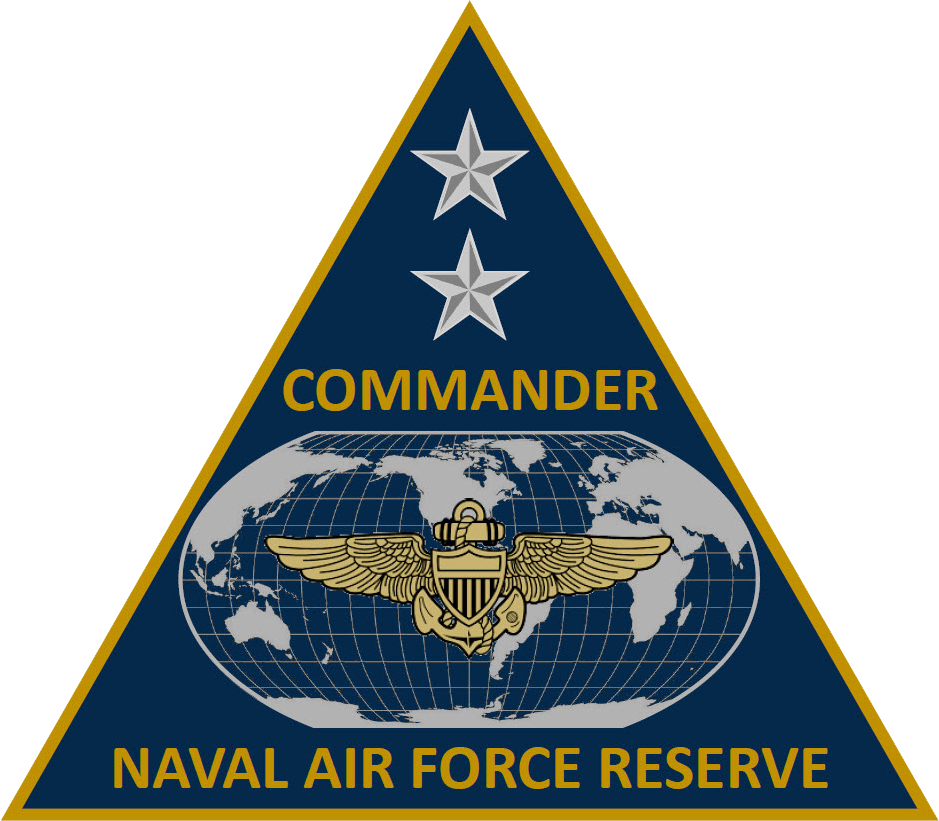
- Naval Air Force Reserve emblem

Aircraft flown
- Electronic warfare: EA-18G
- Fighter: F-5, F-16N, F/A-18E/F
- Helicopter: MH-60R, MH-53E
- Patrol: P-8A
- Transport: C-37B, C-40A, C-130, C-37A

The Naval Air Force Reserve (NAFR, also known by its head, the Commander, Naval Air Force Reserve, abbreviated CNAFR) is the naval aviation component of the United States Navy Reserve. Headquartered at Naval Air Station North Island, California, the organization has control over three aircraft wings, as well as the Navy Air Logistics Office, and Naval Air Facility Washington. The organization retains control over multiple unique assets, controlling the U.S. Navy's entire intra-theater airlift capability within Fleet Logistics Support Wing, as well as all Navy adversary training units, subordinate to the Tactical Support Wing.

== Units ==
The following units are subordinate to the Naval Air Force Reserve as of November 2022:

- Fleet Logistics Support Wing (Naval Air Station Joint Reserve Base Fort Worth, Texas)
  - VR-1 (Naval Air Facility Washington, Maryland)
  - VR-51 (Marine Corps Air Station Kaneohe Bay, Hawaii)
  - VR-53 (Naval Air Facility Washington, Maryland)
  - VR-54 (Naval Air Station Joint Reserve Base New Orleans, Louisiana)
  - VR-55 (Naval Air Station Point Mugu, California)
  - VR-56 (Naval Air Station Oceana, Virginia)
  - VR-57 (Naval Air Station North Island, California)
  - VR-58 (Naval Air Station Jacksonville, Florida)
  - VR-59 (Naval Air Station Joint Reserve Base Fort Worth, Texas)
  - VR-61 (Naval Air Station Whidbey Island, Washington)
  - VR-62 (Naval Air Station Jacksonville, Florida)
  - VR-64 (Joint Base McGuire–Dix–Lakehurst, New Jersey
- Maritime Support Wing (Naval Air Station North Island, California)
  - HSM-60 (Naval Air Station Jacksonville, Florida)
  - HSM-61 (Naval Air Station North Island, California)
  - VP-62 (Naval Air Station Jacksonville, Florida)
  - VP-69 (Naval Air Station Whidbey Island, Washington)
- Tactical Support Wing (Naval Air Station Joint Reserve Base Fort Worth, Texas)
  - VFC-12 (Naval Air Station Oceana, Virginia)
  - VFC-13 (Naval Air Station Fallon, Nevada)
  - VFC-111 (Naval Air Station Key West, Florida)
  - VFC-204 (Naval Air Station Joint Reserve Base New Orleans, Louisiana)
  - VAQ-209 (Naval Air Station Whidbey Island, Washington)

== Gallery ==
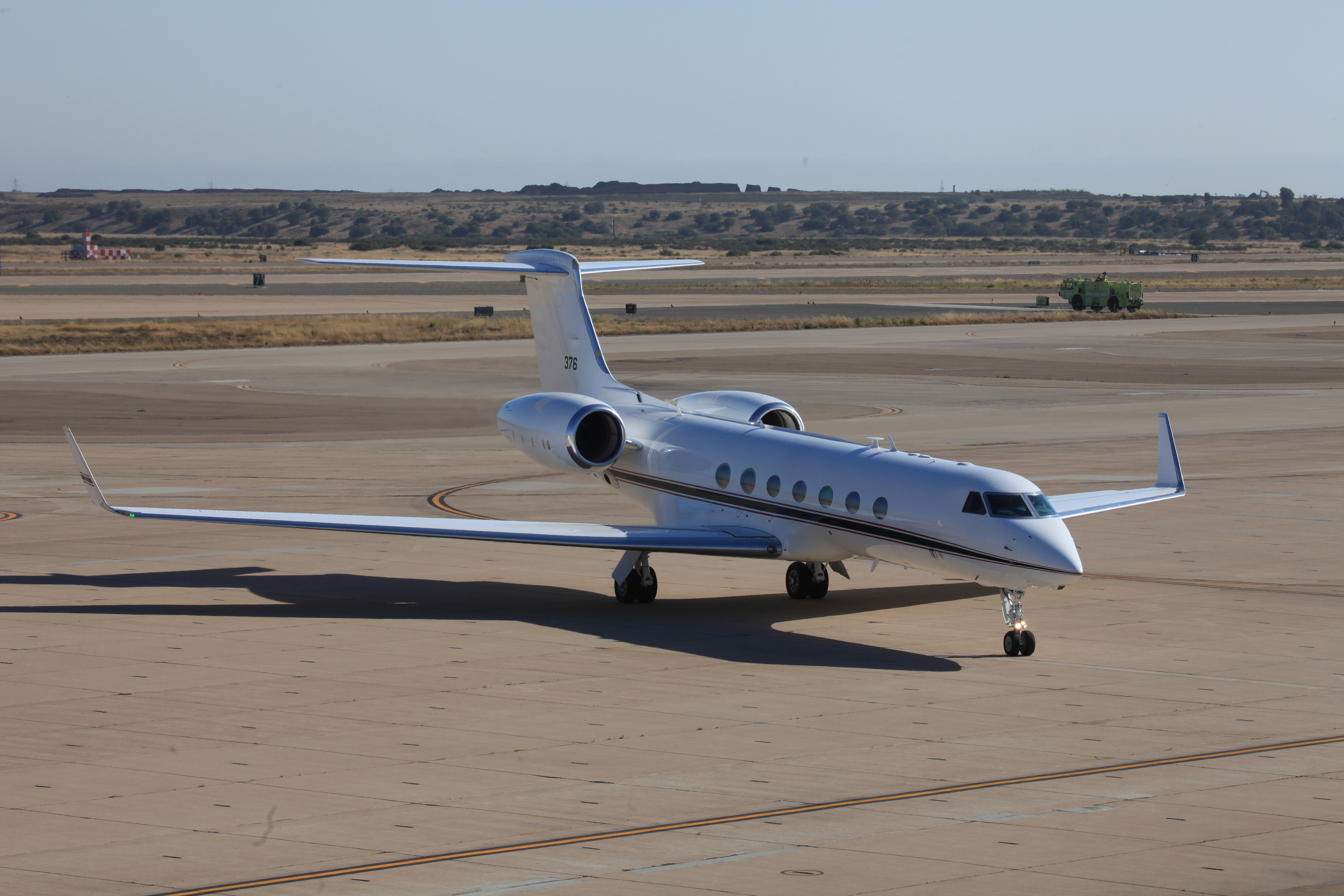
A Gulfstream C-37B of VR-1 at MCAS Miramar, 2012

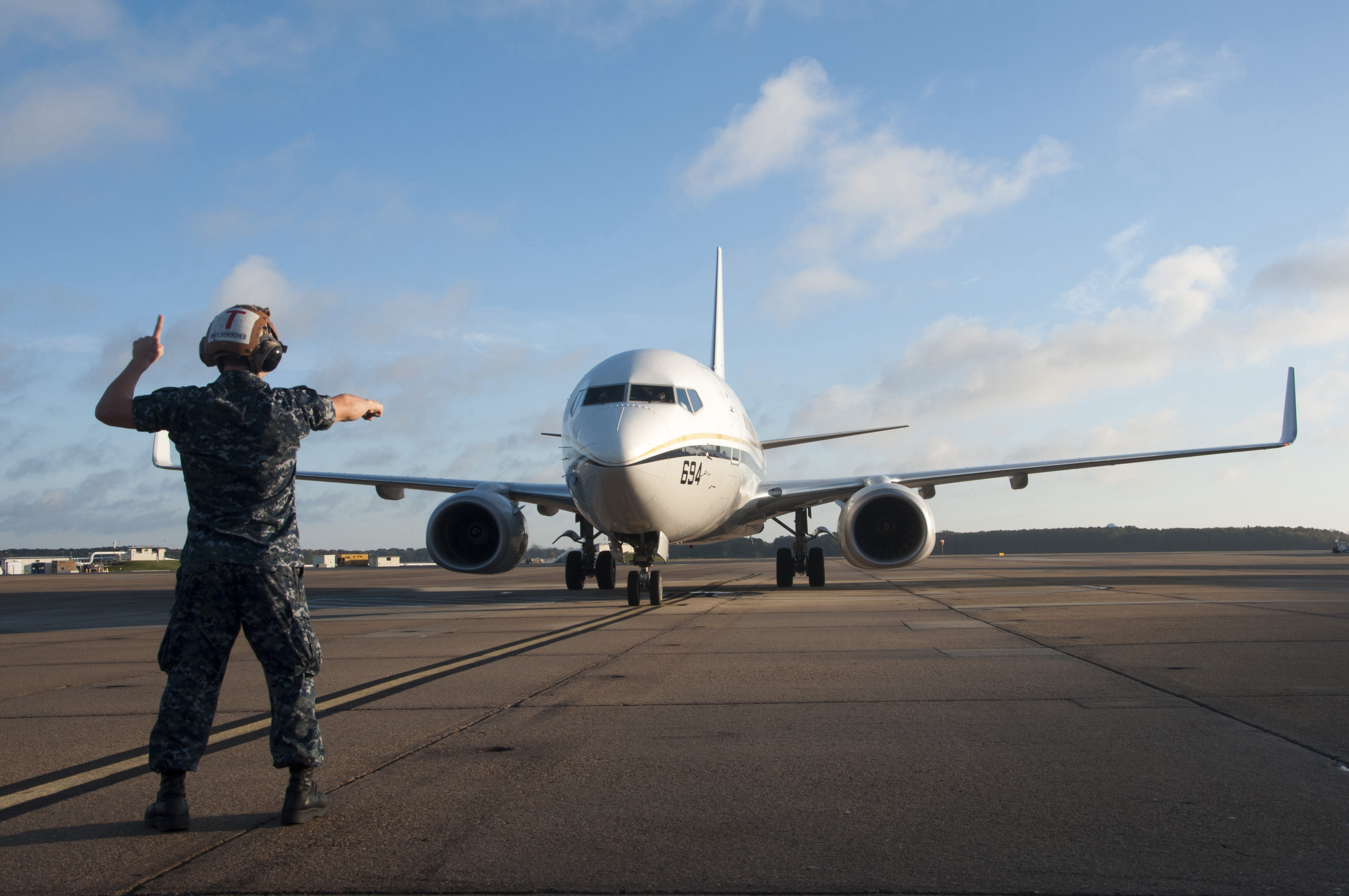
A C-40A Clipper of VR-56 at NAS Oceana, 2015

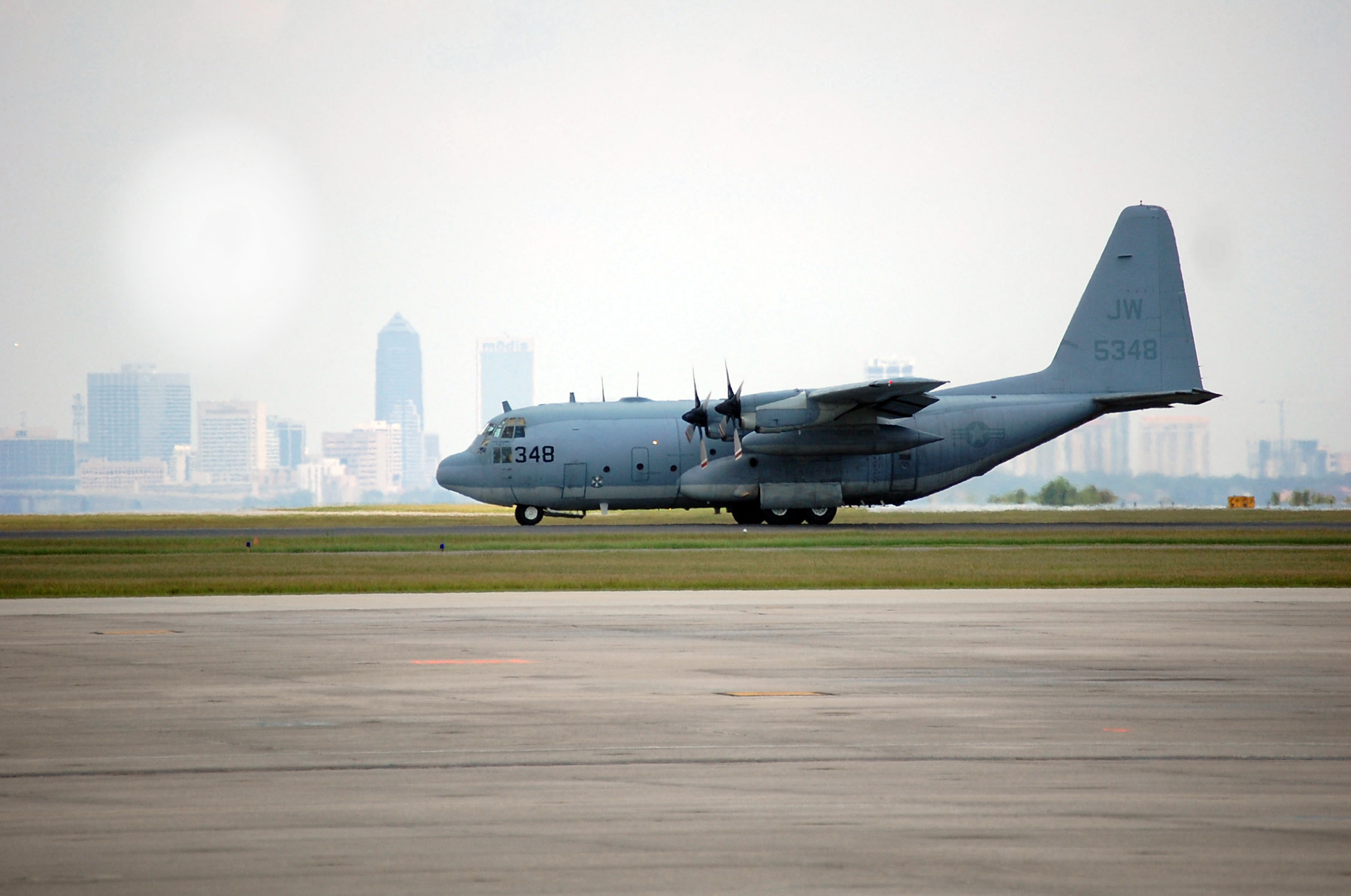
A C-130T of VR-62 at NAS Jacksonville, 2009

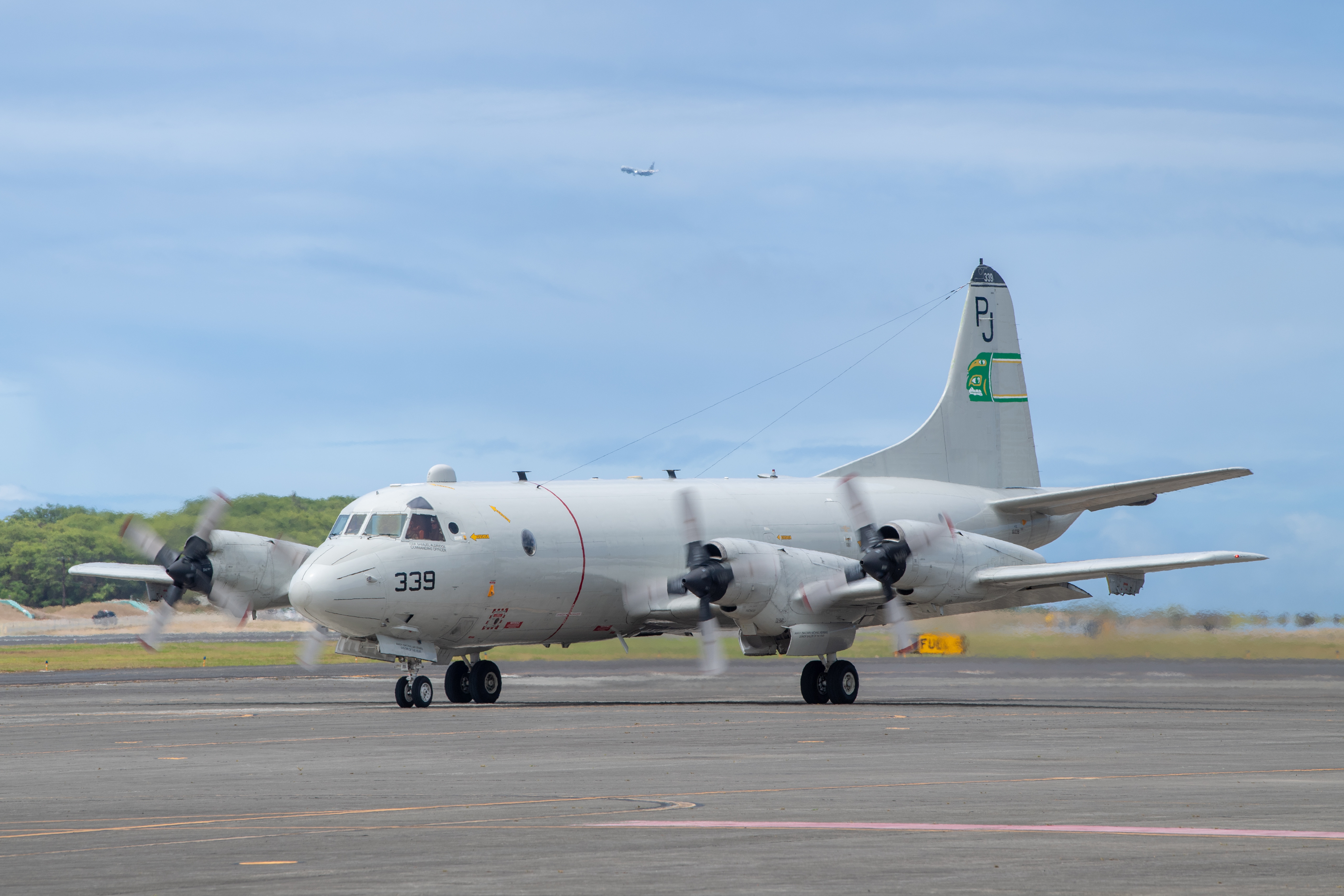
A P-3C Orion of VP-69 at MCB Hawaii, 2022

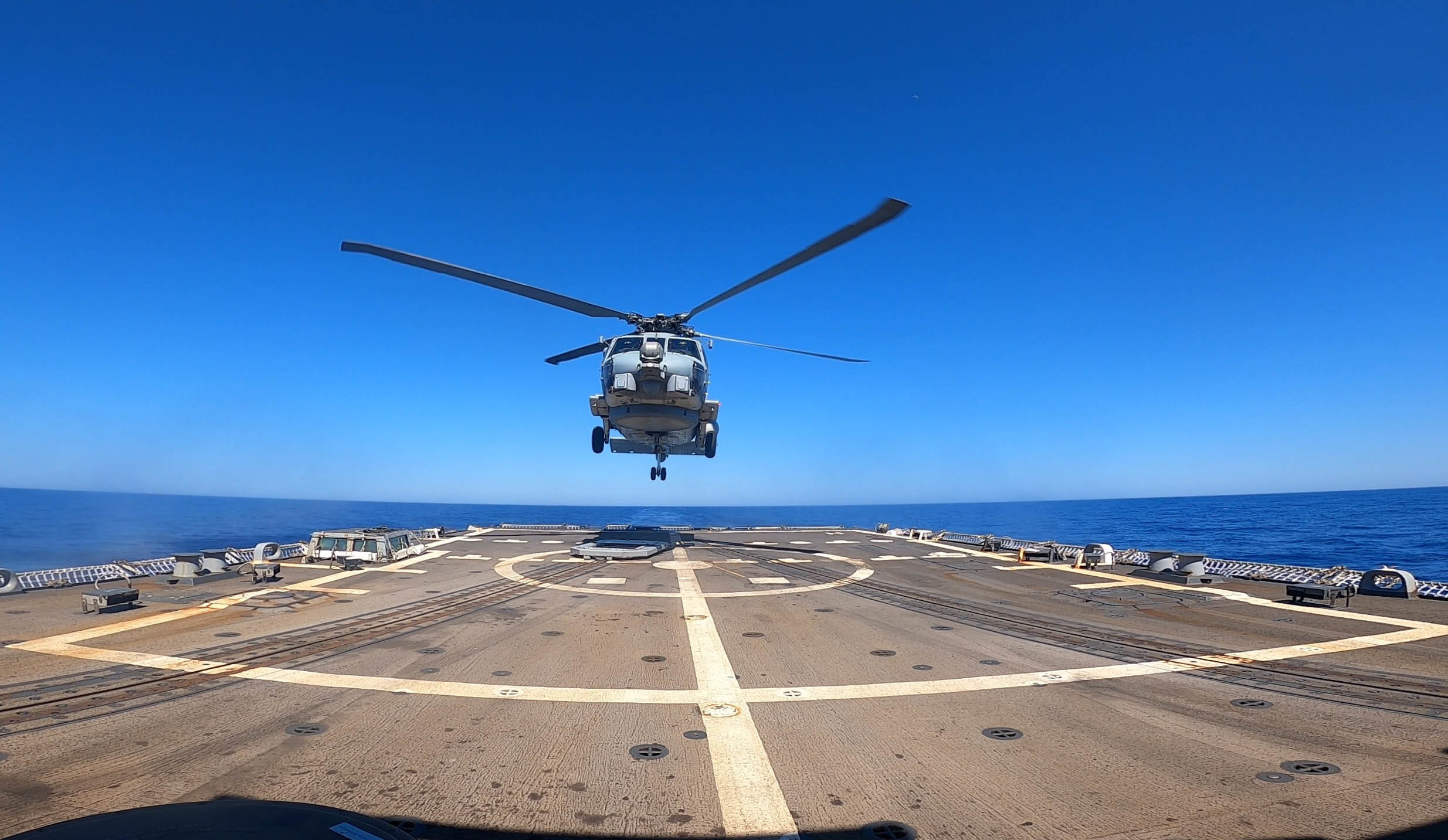
An MH-60R of HSM-60 lands aboard USS Forrest Sherman (DDG-98), 2022

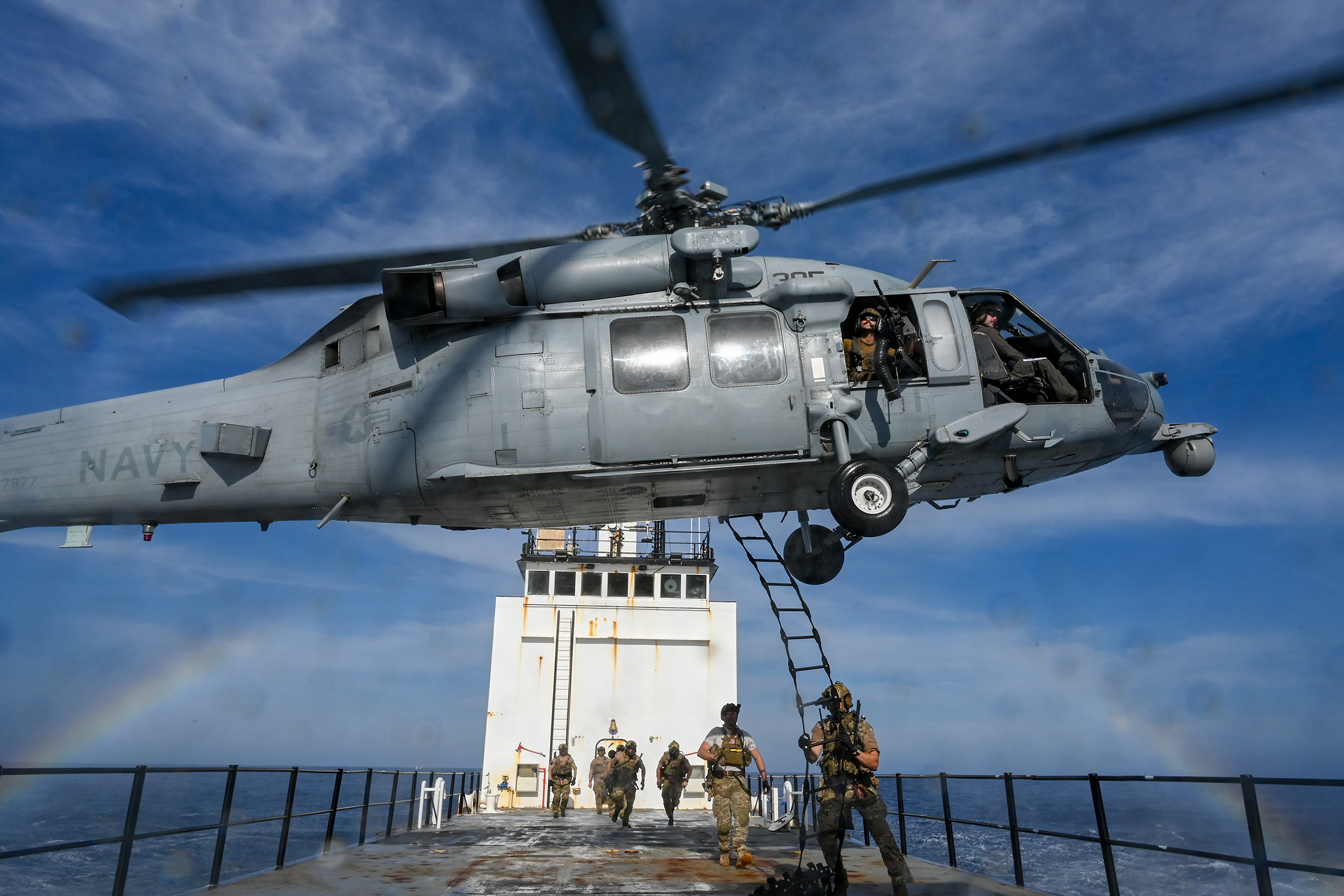
An MH-60S of HSC-85 picks up Navy SEALs from the deck of ATLS-9701 during an exercise, 2022

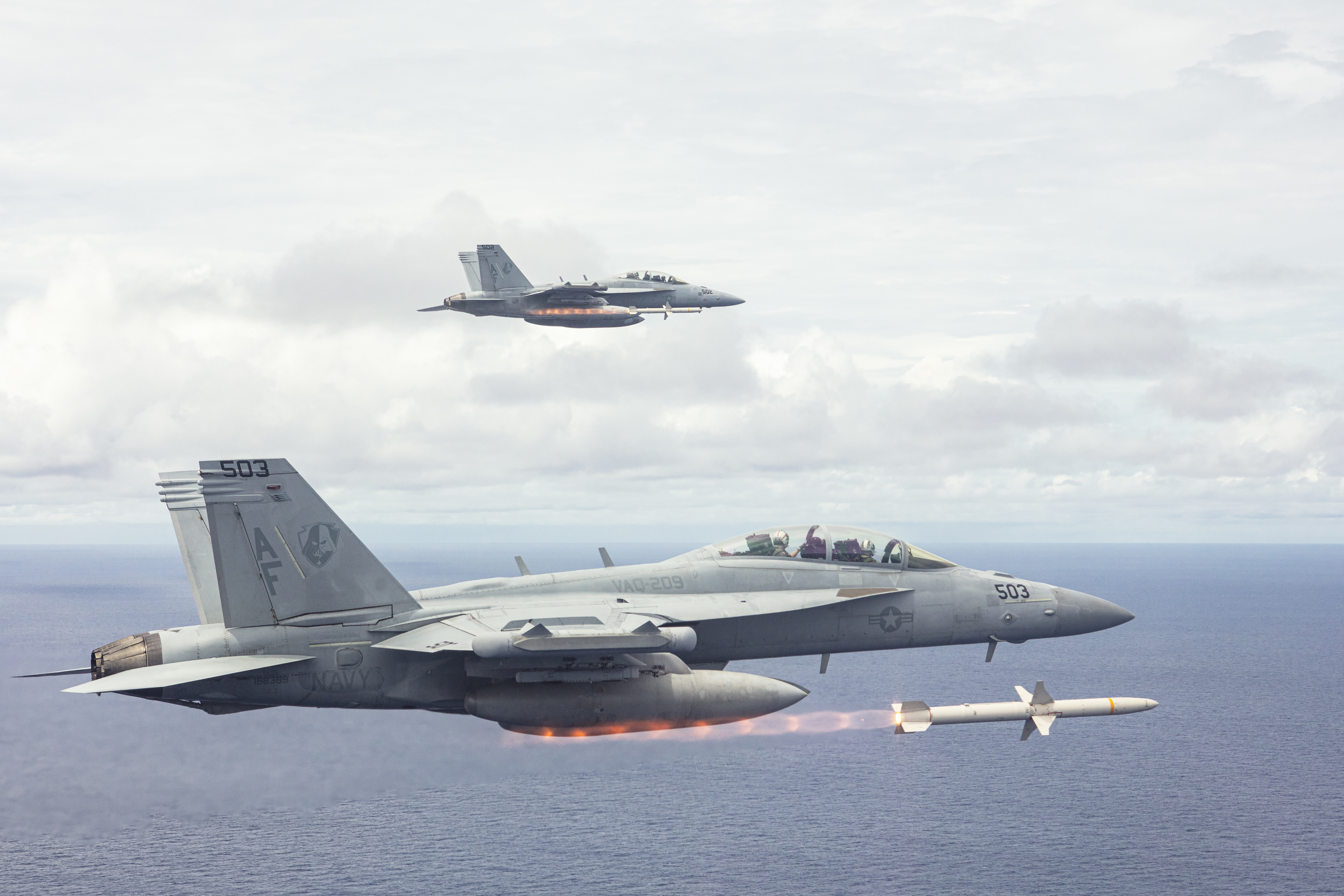
Two EA-18G Growlers of VAQ-209 conduct a live fire exercise over the Pacific Ocean, 2022

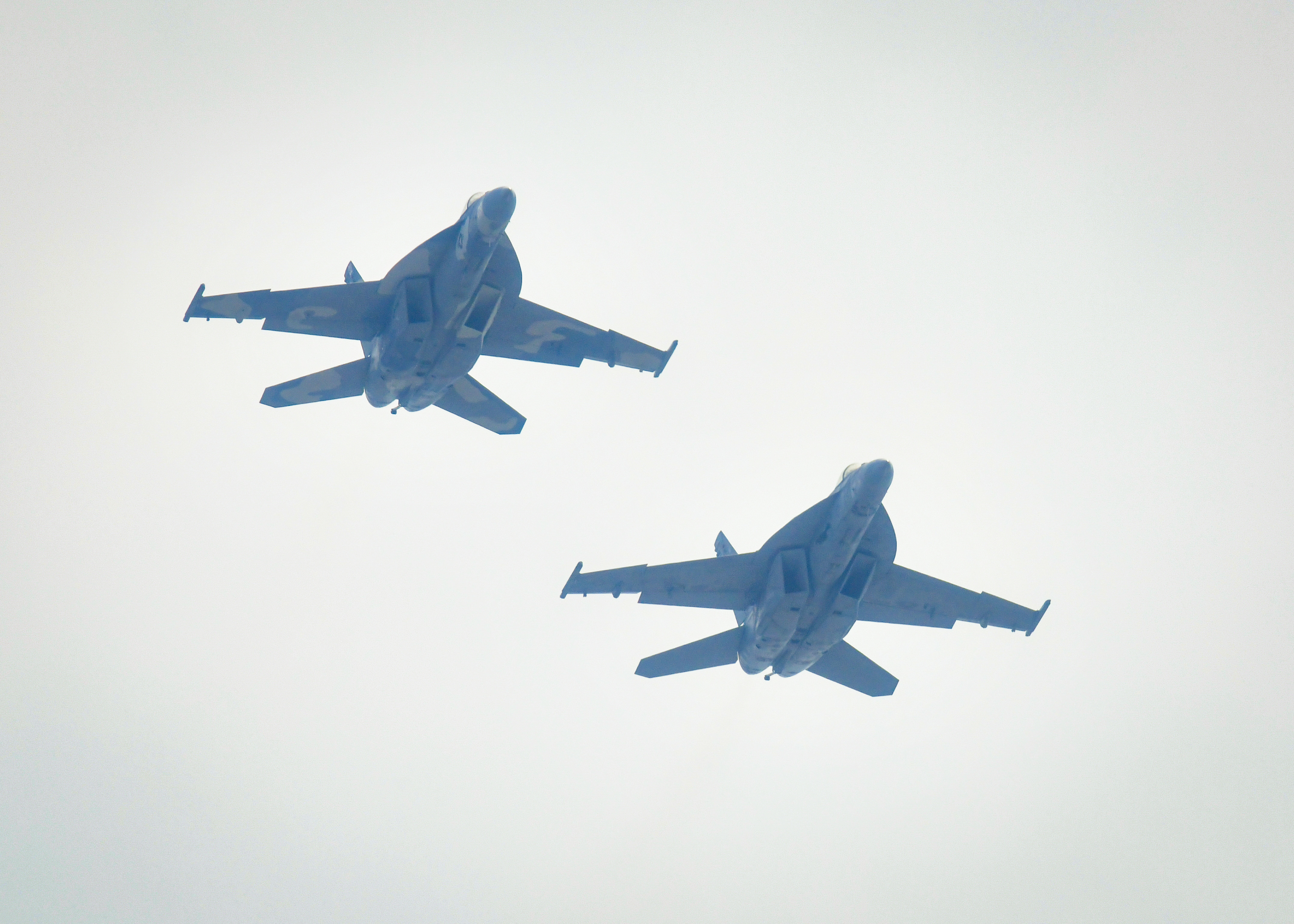
Two F/A-18E/F Super Hornets of VFC-12 perform a flyover at an airshow in Baltimore, 2022

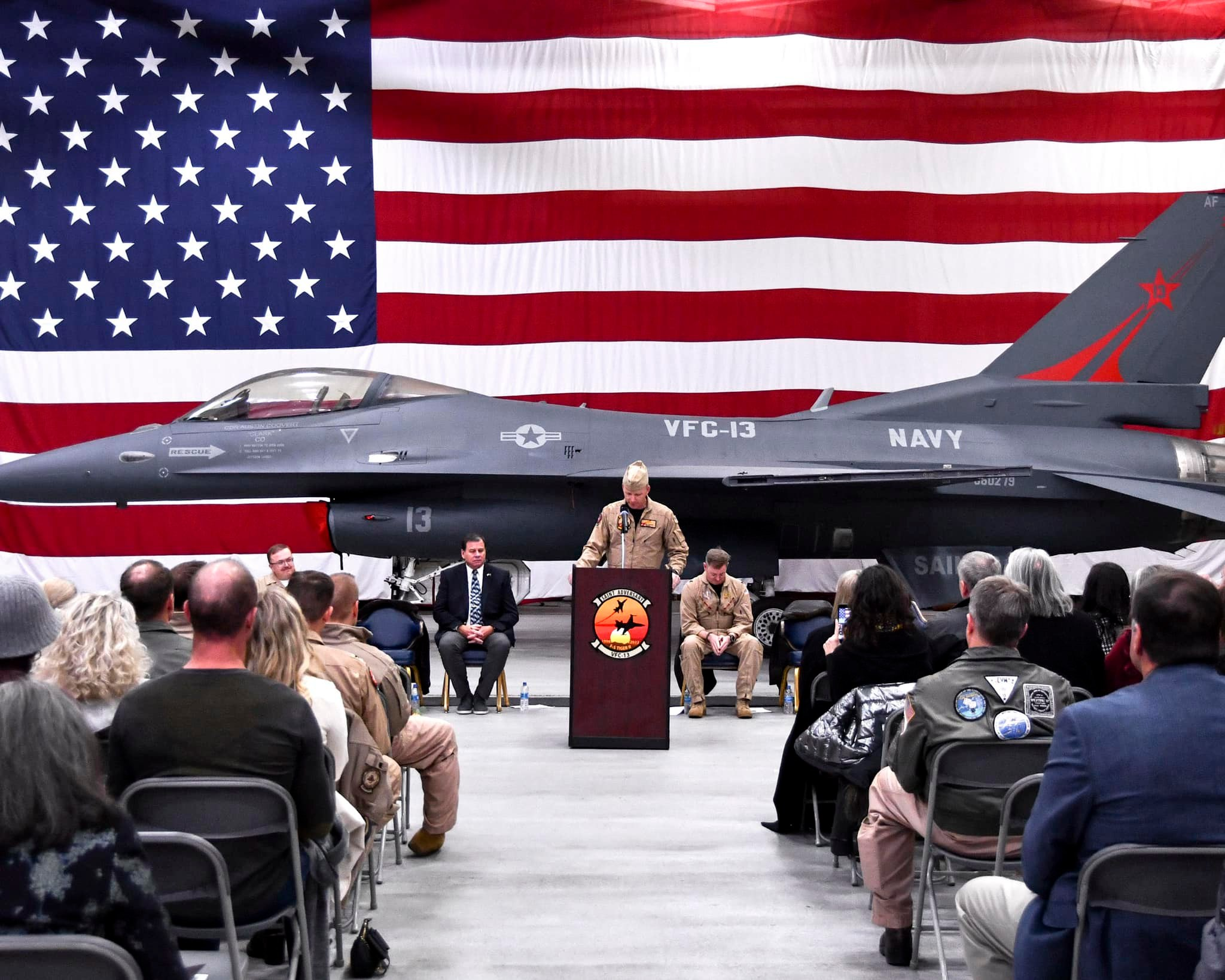
An F-16C Fighting Falcon of VFC-13 during a ceremony at NAS Fallon, 2022

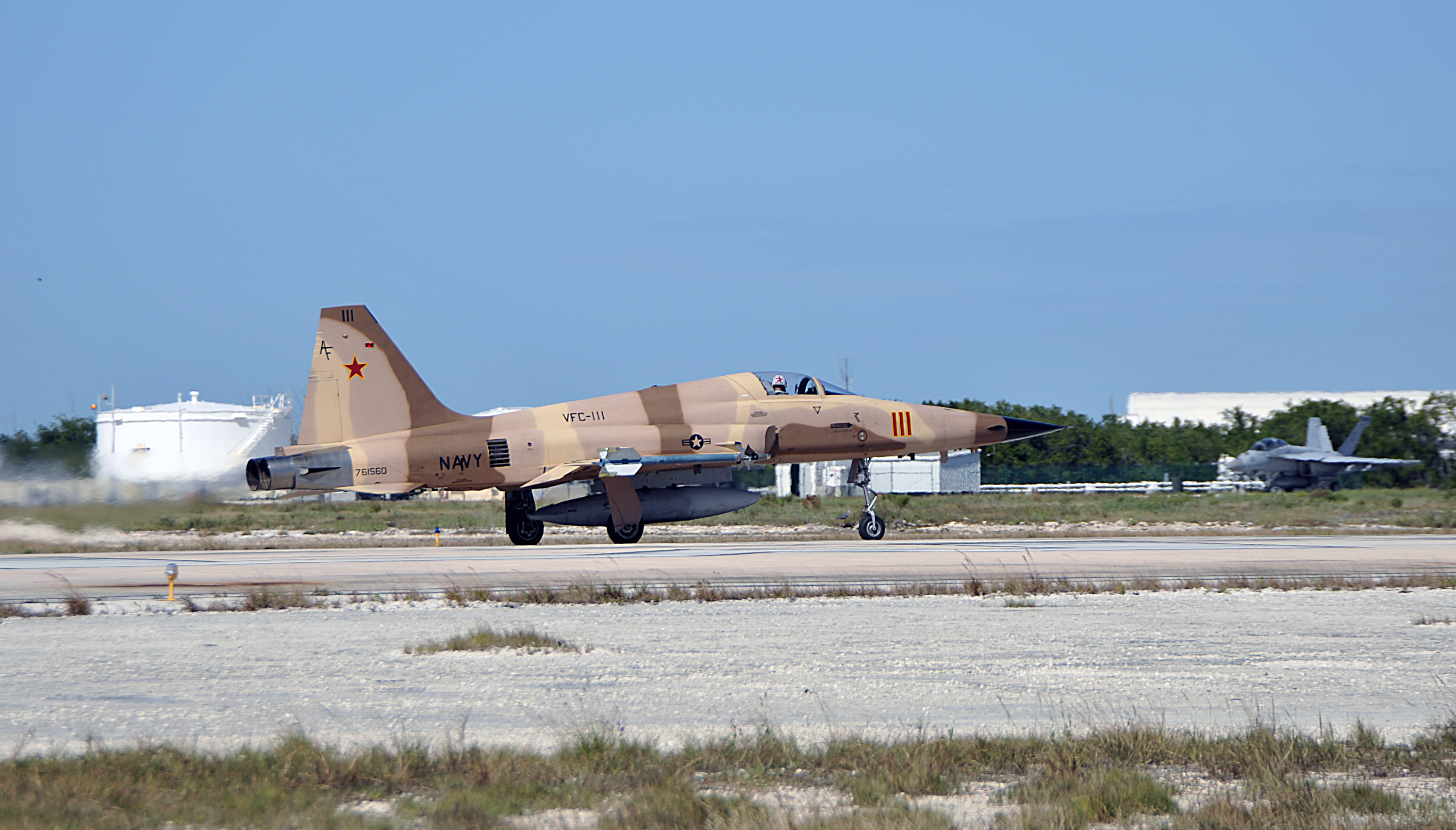
An F-5N Tiger II of VFC-111 at NAS Key West, 2014
