= NAFR =

NAFR may refer to:

- National Administration of Financial Regulation, a Chinese government agency
- Naval Air Force Reserve, a component of the United States Navy Reserve
- Nellis Air Force Range, former name of the Nevada Test and Training Range
