= VR-55 =

Fleet Logistics Support Squadron 55 (VR-55)
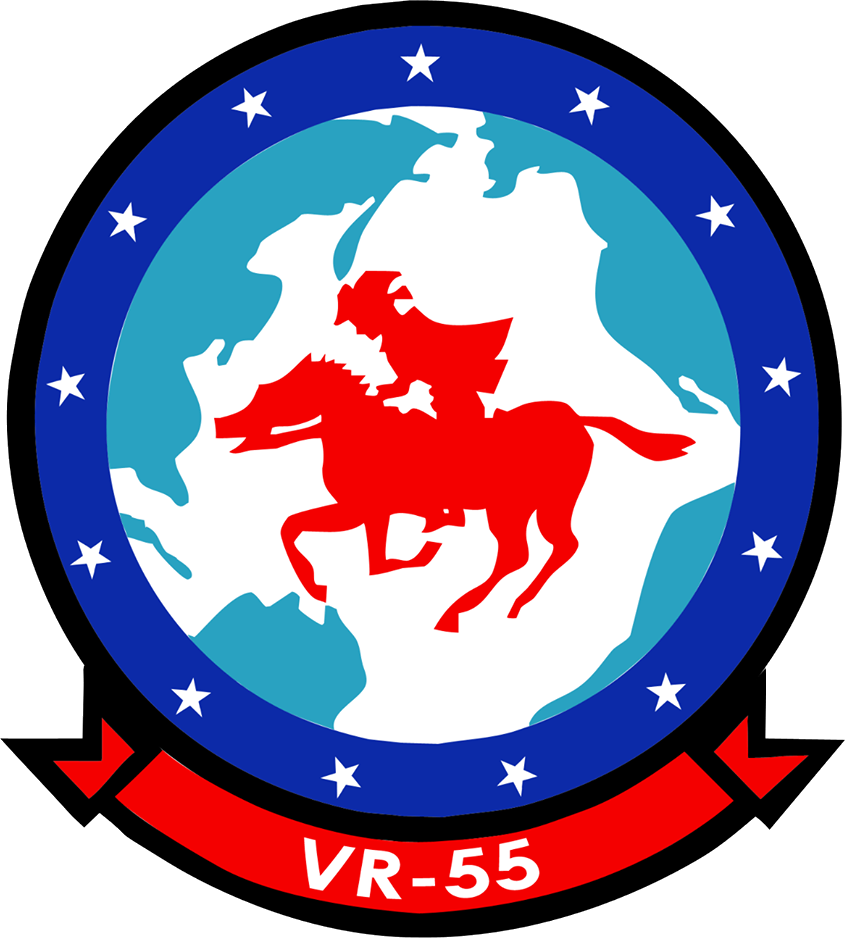
- Active: 1 April 1976 – present (50 years, 1 month)
- Country: United States
- Branch: United States Navy
- Type: Fleet Logistics Support Squadron
- Role: Medium Airlift
- Part of: United States Navy Reserve: Fleet Logistics Support Wing
- Stationed: NAS Point Mugu, California
- Nickname: Minutemen
- Colors: Red/White/Bllue
- Decorations: 2003 Navy Unit Commendation; 2005 Humanitarian Service medal - Hurricane Katrina relief effort 2011 Humanitarian Service Medal Operation Tomodachi Tsunami Relief; 1996 Armed Forces Service Medal; 1991 Navy E Ribbon; 2004 Navy E Ribbon; 2009 Navy E Ribbon; 2012 Navy E Ribbon; 2013 Navy E Ribbon; 2017 Navy E Ribbon; 1994 Meritorious Unit Commendation; 2006 Meritorious Unit Commendation

Insignia
- Tail Code: Romeo Uniform

Aircraft flown
- Transport: Lockheed C-130T Hercules; Lockheed KC-130T-30; Lockheed KC-130T Hercules

Fleet Logistics Support Squadron 55 (VR-55) is a reserve aviation unit of the United States Navy. The squadron was established in April 1976 and is based at Naval Air Station Point Mugu, California. It is equipped with the Lockheed C-130T Hercules.

== History ==
=== Inception, establishment and the first decade (1976-1986) ===
In September 1974, 30 reserve personnel from NARU Alameda and Fleet Tactical Support Squadron 30 embarked on a pilot program to gauge the feasibility of expanding Navy Reserve Air Force logistics capabilities. Dubbed the “Naval Air Reserve C-9B Transport Reinforcement Program,” the official command history noted the “harmonious interaction of regular and reserve personnel was a singular contribution with results far exceeding expectations.”

The Navy's Pacific Fleet established Fleet Logistics Support Squadron 55 (VR-55) on 1 April 1976 at a ceremony held in its home base of NAS Alameda, California. Captain Richard Hendel, USN Ready Reserve, took command of three C-9 Skytrain aircraft and 220 personnel of the squadron that would be nicknamed “The Minutemen” due to its establishment during the United States Bicentennial celebration. The “Bicentennial Minutemen” operated the Navy's first reserve jet squadron, conducting both logistical operations as well as pioneering the Navy's “pathfinder” program. Utilizing its unique and technologically superior navigational capabilities, the Minutemen played a vital role in the execution of Operation Key Joint, escorting six A-6E Intruders of VA-196 from Barbers Point, HI. to NAS Cubi Point in the Philippines.

In its first (partial) year of operations, the Minutemen recorded 3,030.7 flight hours, transporting 55,507 passengers and 2.8 million pounds of cargo.

In 1983, VR-55 extended its mission from the Pacific Rim to reach the Mediterranean Sea and Central America. The squadron augmented EUCOM logistics for the first time in November 1983, while another detachment participated in the humanitarian Project Handclasp, transporting supplies to Honduras on 3 November.

In 1986, VR-55 added VIP transport to its list of missions, carrying a DACOWITS (Defense Advisory Committee on Women in the Service) contingent on a 14-day fact-finding tour throughout military installations in the Western pacific. With its aircraft appointed in a relatively spartan manner, members of the command donated their own time and money to procure furnishings from a major airline special equipment sale to prepare for the luminaries. “I’ve seen Vice President Bush’s C-9, and it’s not as nice as this” remarked one committee member after the trip.

=== A Squadron in transition (1987-2002) ===
The ensuing decades presented a new theme for the Minutemen: maintaining operational readiness while undergoing major transitions. The first taste of this came in October 1989, when the 6.9-magnitude Loma Prieta Earthquake damaged the runways and facilities at NAS Alameda. The squadron subsequently moved its operations to Oakland International Airport and managed to fly 105% of its projected flight hours for the year.

The following year saw a sudden outbreak of war in the Middle East. In the span of just four days, VR-55 marshalled its resources to deploy to Sembach Air Base, Germany, in support of Operation Desert Storm.

During the war, VR-55 operated planes from Germany as well as Fujairah, UAE and a maintenance detachment at NSA Souda Bay, Crete. From 26 December 1990 to 8 April 1991, the squadron achieved a 100% mission completion rate, flying 4,327 passengers and 2.8 million pounds of cargo under “the most rigorous conditions ever encountered by a VR squadron.” VR-55 earned its first Noel Davis Battle Efficiency award (“Battle ‘E’”) for the effort in 1991.

During the Gulf War, VR-55 set records for the most monthly and quarterly hours flown by a squadron, logging 794 hours in January 1991 and 2,178 hours for the second quarter of FY 1991.

In March 1992, the Minutemen flew a C-9 into Constanta, Romania, only the third US military aircraft ever to do so. This came as the squadron began to wind down C-9 operations to transition to the C-130T.

In September 1993, VR-55 delivered the last of its C-9s to the Fleet Logistics Support Wing and took delivery of six C-130T airframes. In addition to the platform change, September also saw the Minutemen move operations from Alameda to Hangar #1 at Moffett Federal Air Field.

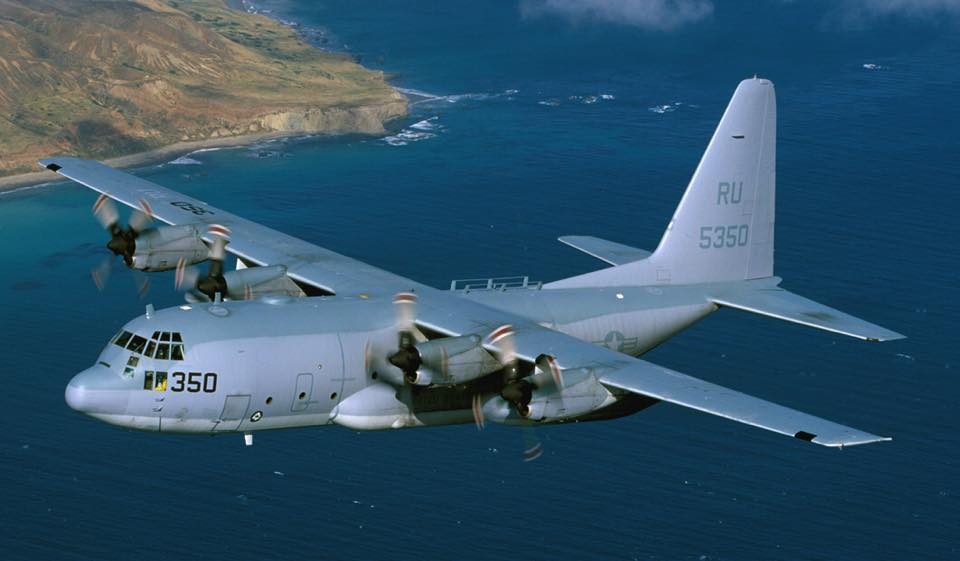
Aircraft 165350 was one of the original six C-130Ts delivered to VR-55 in 1993

There, C-130 operations proved so vital to fleet logistics that a move to relinquish scheduling authority to a Joint Operational Support Airlift Center (JOSAC) was turned down in favor of Naval Air Logistics Office (NALO), which remains the scheduling authority to this day.

Operational highlights of the period between Gulf Wars included the delivery of a pallet of donated toys to the children of Mostar, Bosnia and Herzegovina the week before Christmas in 1997, operational support of the aftermath of the crash of Alaska Airlines flight 261 on Anacapa Island and the Navy's first C-130 around-the-world flight in 2001.

On 21 December 1998, VR-55 began yet another move, this time 350 miles south to its current home of Naval Air Station Point Mugu, California at Naval Base Ventura County, just outside Oxnard and 45 miles (72 km) north of Los Angeles.

=== Modern Day (2003-present) ===
In April 2003, the Minutemen helped kick off Operation Iraqi Freedom, deploying three planes and 13 crews. They flew 122 sorties, 937.7 hours and moved 1,040 passengers and 2.68 million pounds of cargo in theater.

In September 2004, the Minutemen sent a detachment to Willow Grove, Pa. to assist in transitioning VR-64 (formerly VP-64) from the P-3 Orion to the C-130T. VR-55 donated one of its aircraft to the cause as well.

As combat flights continued in support of joint operations in the Middle East and Afghanistan, the focus at home turned to humanitarian crises. The Minutemen participated in efforts in the wake of Hurricane Katrina (2005), Typhoon Melor (2009) and Tsunami relief in Haiti (Operation Unified Response, 2010) and Japan (Operation Tomodachi, 2011).

In 2013, VR-55 took delivery of two KC-130T-30 aircraft, capable of flying an enhanced cargo load over the normal C-130T. This further augmented the squadron's logistics capabilities. 2014 saw the replacement of its 3 C-130Ts with USMC KC-130T airframes.

As of the end of FY 2018, VR-55 has flown 41 years and 177,177 accident-free flight hours. The Minutemen operate five aircraft in support of operations in the Pacific, Mediterranean, Middle East, Europe, Africa, Oceania and the Americas. VR-55 has 275 Training and Administration of the Reserve (TAR) personnel and Selected Reservists (SELRES), including 35 pilots.
