= VR-62 =

Fleet Logistics Support Squadron 62
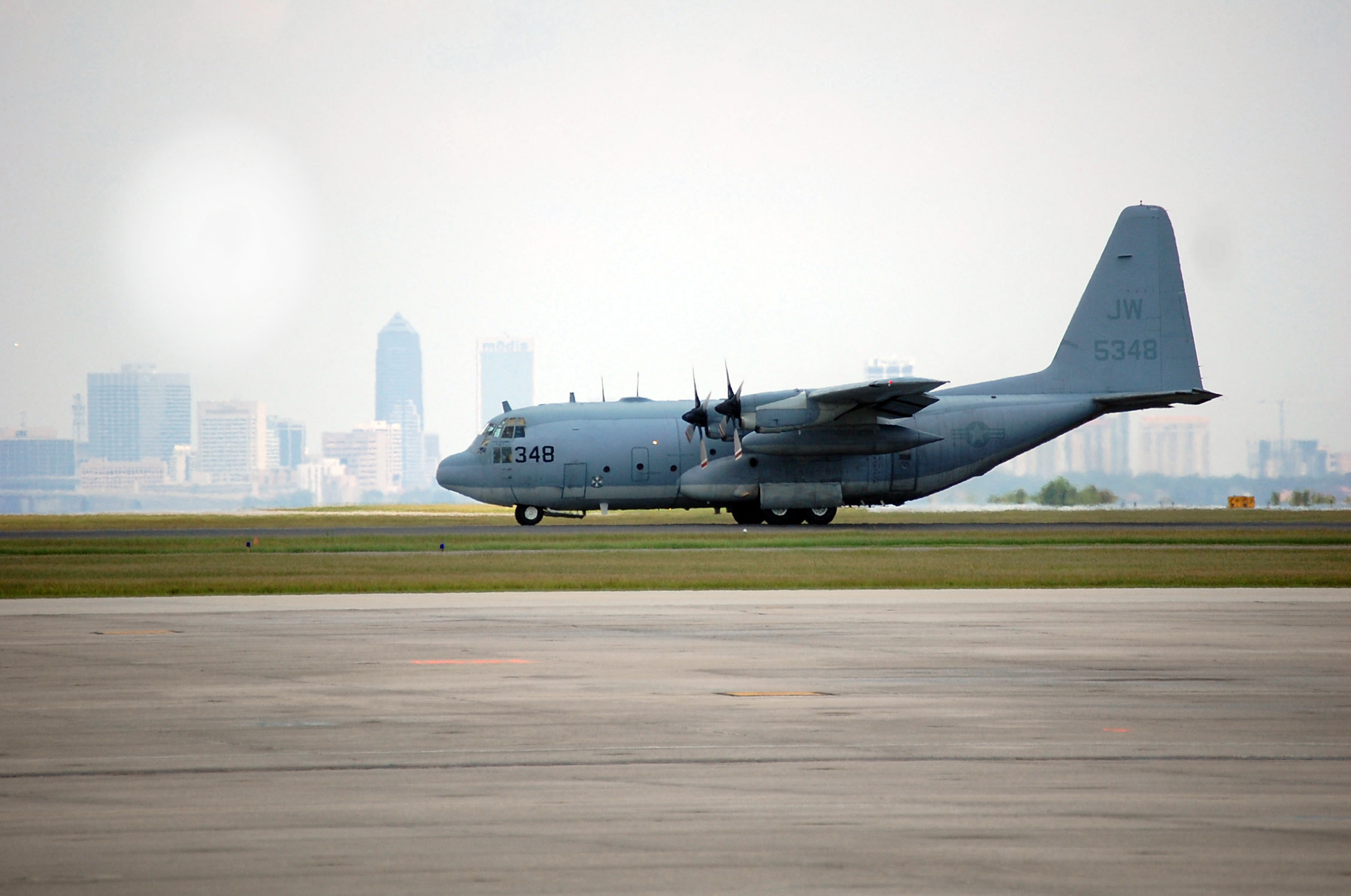
- One of the squadron's C-130T Hercules lands at NAS Jacksonville in 2009
- Active: 1 July 1985 – present 41 years
- Country: United States
- Branch: United States Navy
- Type: Fleet Logistics Support Squadron
- Role: Medium Airlift
- Part of: United States Naval Reserve: Fleet Logistics Support Wing
- Stationed: NAS Jacksonville, Florida
- Nickname: Nomads

Insignia
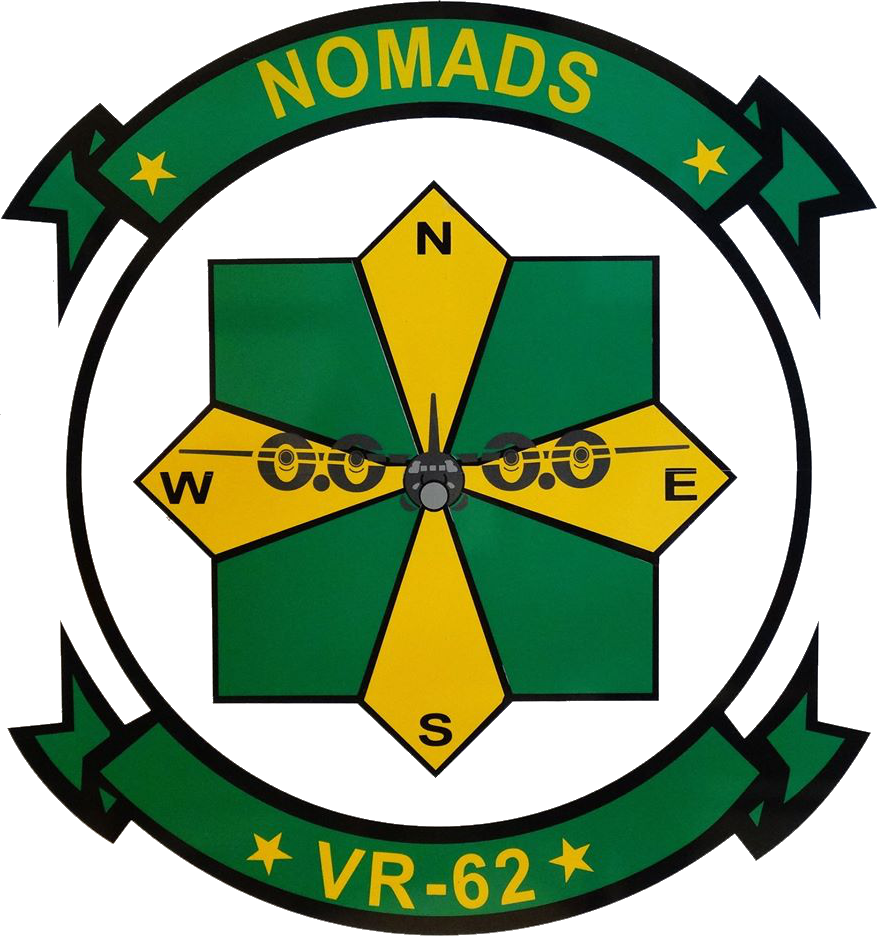
- VR-62 insignia

Aircraft flown
- Transport: McDonnell Douglas C-9B Skytrain II; Lockheed C-130T Hercules; Lockheed KC-130T Hercules

Fleet Logistics Support Squadron 62 (VR-62), nicknamed the Nomads, is one of five U.S. Navy Reserve squadrons operating the Lockheed C-130T Hercules medium-lift cargo aircraft. Based at Naval Air Station Jacksonville, Florida, the squadron is crewed by a combination of traditional part-time drilling Selected Reservists (SELRES) and a full-time active duty Navy Reserve cadre known as Training and Administration of the Reserve (TAR) personnel (previously known as Full Time Support (FTS) personnel from August 2006 to November 2021). The squadron is under the operational control of Commander, Fleet Logistics Support Wing (COMFLELOGSUPWING) at NAS JRB Fort Worth, Texas.

== Mission ==
VR-62 provides Navy Unique Fleet Essential Airlift (NUFEA), a capability totally resident in the Naval Air Force Reserve, comprising 24 C-130T Hercules aircraft in five squadrons and 17 Boeing C-40A Clipper aircraft in an additional six squadrons for responsive, flexible and rapidly deployable air logistics support to combat operations at sea and from the sea. The C-130T fills the U.S. Navy's airlift requirements for outside cargo and, prior to the introduction of the Bell Boeing CMV-22B Osprey, was the only U.S. Navy aircraft capable of internally lifting all modules of the Pratt & Whitney F135 engine for the Lockheed Martin F-3B Lightning II STOVL variant strike fighter flown by the U.S. Marine Corps from WASP class and AMERICA class amphibious assault ships and the F-35C CATOBAR variant strike fighter flown by both the U.S. Navy and U.S. Marine Corps from NIMITZ class and GERALD R. FORD class aircraft carriers.

The C-130T also provides the U.S. Navy with the unique ability to deliver passengers and cargo to austere locations, including unprepared fields and runways less than 3,000 feet long.

== History ==
VR-62 was established on 1 July 1985 at then-Naval Air Facility Detroit, a tenant activity at Selfridge Air National Guard Base, Michigan under the operational control of Commander, Fleet Logistics Support Wing at then-Naval Air Station Dallas, Texas. In February 1988, the squadron began providing logistics support flights operating the McDonnell Douglas C-9B Skytrain II aircraft, adopting the squadron nickname of Motowners in view of their proximity to Detroit.

Following nine years of outstanding worldwide airlift service to the fleet from the home station at NAF Detroit, the 1991 BRAC Commission directed the realignment of NAF Detroit as Naval Air Reserve Center Detroit (NAVAIRESCEN Detroit) and the inactivation or transfer of all Naval Reserve aviation squadrons based there. As part of this BRAC decision, the VR-62 Motowners were ordered to change their homeport and transition from the C-9B to the C-130T Hercules aircraft. In 1994, the squadron changed its homeport from NAF Detroit to Naval Air Station South Weymouth, Massachusetts, and adopted a new nickname of Mass Transport, acknowledging their new home station in Massachusetts.

VR-62 retired its C-9B aircraft and received their first of four C-130T aircraft in January 1995. Following several months of rigorous transition training, VR-62 began its operational commitments with the C-130T, sending squadron detachments to Sicily, Japan and Bahrain in support of worldwide naval operations.

The 1995 BRAC Commission ordered the disestablishment and closure of NAS South Weymouth and VR-62 was again ordered to change their homeport. In 1996, the squadron relocated to Naval Air Station Brunswick, Maine, and received yet another nickname as the Nor' Easters based on their new home station in Maine.

Nine years later, the 2005 BRAC Commission ordered the disestablishment and closure of NAS Brunswick and VR-62 relocated to their present homeport of NAS Jacksonville in 2009. With this move, the squadron adopted their current nickname of the Nomads, a tongue-in-cheek reference to the squadron's three previous BRAC-directed moves over a 15-year period.

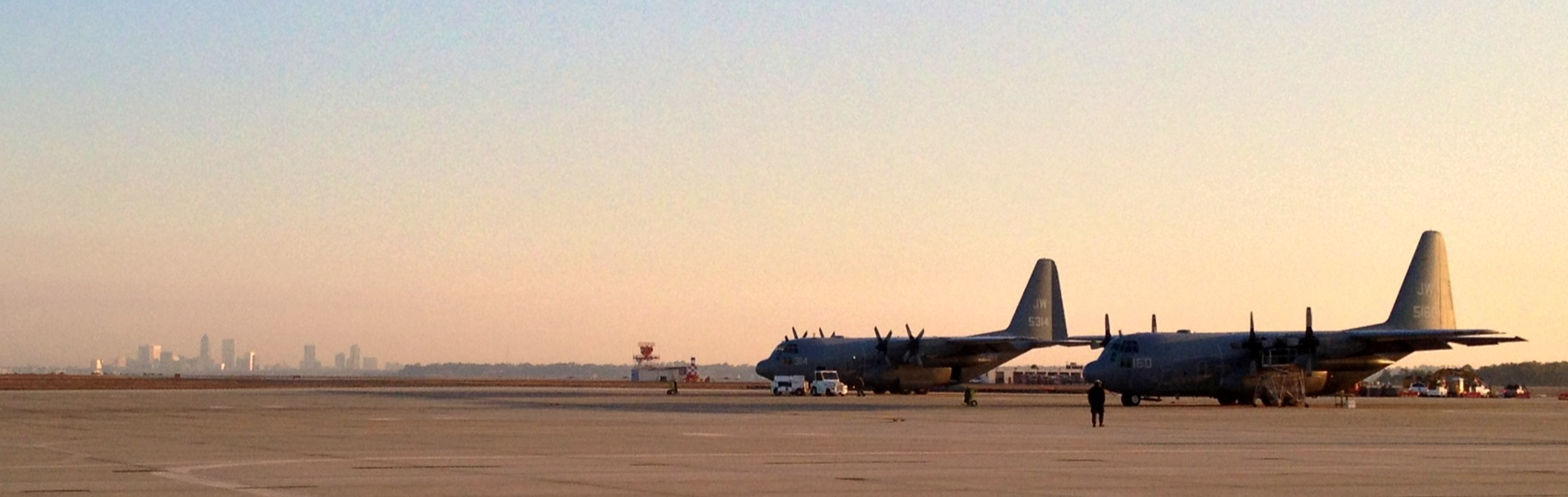
Two C-130s on the flight line at NAS Jacksonville in 2013

VR-62 continues to report to COMFLELOGSUPWING, the latter command now located at NAS JRB Fort Worth (former Carswell AFB), Texas. Now equipped with six C-130T aircraft and crewed by 215 personnel, the squadron consists of 85 full-time active-duty TAR and 130 part-time drilling SELRES personnel. Of the officers, a total of 35 TAR and SELRES are pilots, all on operational flight status as Naval Aviators. The remaining 180 personnel perform various roles in aircraft maintenance, squadron administration, safety, and operations. A portion of the squadron's SELRES and TAR enlisted force are also on active flight status as Naval Aircrewmen, flying as C-130T flight engineers and loadmasters.

In many respects, VR-62's operational tempo is practically indistinguishable from that of an active-duty Regular Navy aviation squadron. The squadron's SELRES pilots and enlisted flight crewmembers readily perform twice the amount of military duty, if not three or four times as much, as the traditional one weekend drill a month and two weeks active duty per year model typically associated with most Reserve Component organizations and personnel in the U.S. Armed Forces.

VR-62 remains an integral part of fleet support having transported in excess of 29,500 passengers and over 29 million pounds of cargo since receiving the C-130T aircraft. In 2021, the squadron is also slated to commence an aerial refueling mission with the installation of the NP2000 eight-bladed composite propeller system and the addition of an aerial refueling package to refuel USN, USMC and NATO/Allied fixed with rotary wing aircraft in flight, effectively converting VR-62's C-130T aircraft into a KC-130T configuration.

== See also ==
- History of the United States Navy
- List of United States Navy aircraft squadrons
