= VR-54 =

Fleet Logistics Support Squadron 54 (VR-54)
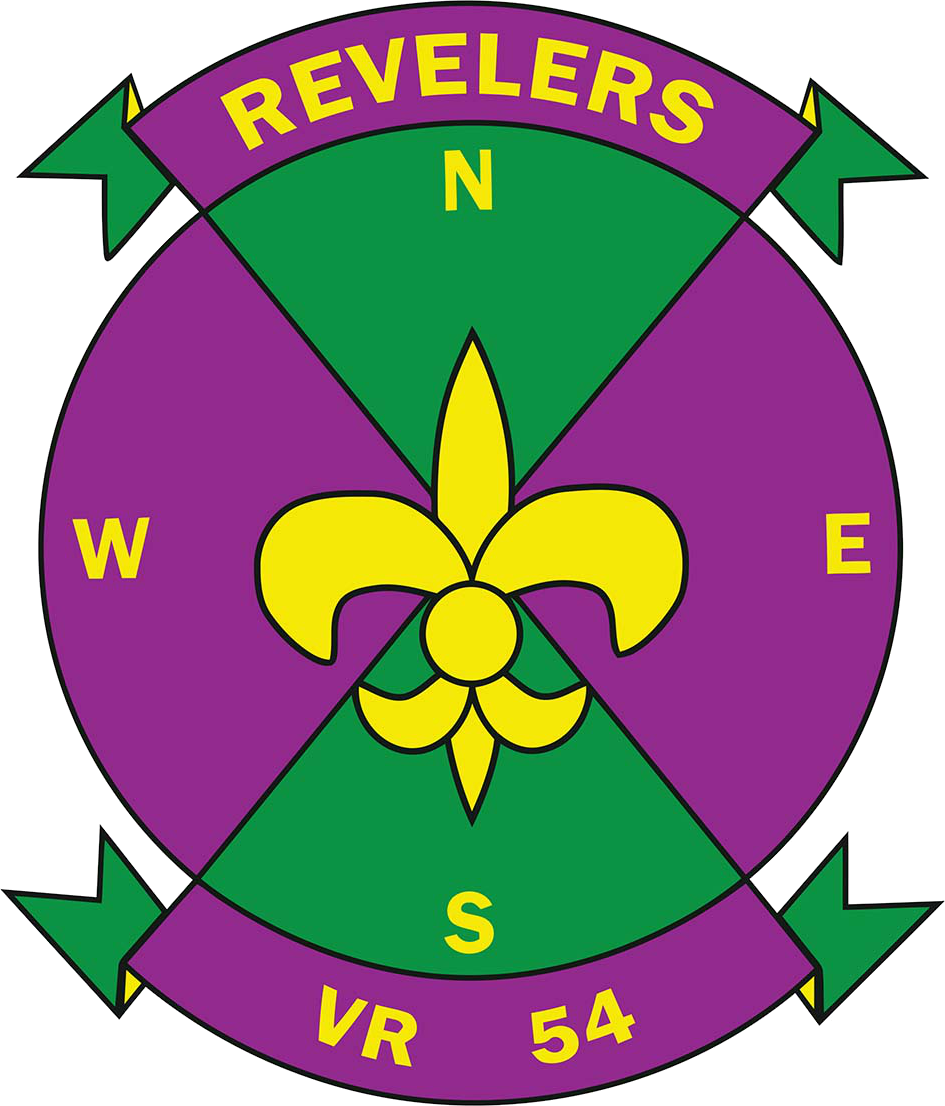
- Active: 1 June 1991 – present
- Country: United States of America
- Branch: United States Navy
- Garrison/HQ: NAS JRB New Orleans
- Nickname: Revelers

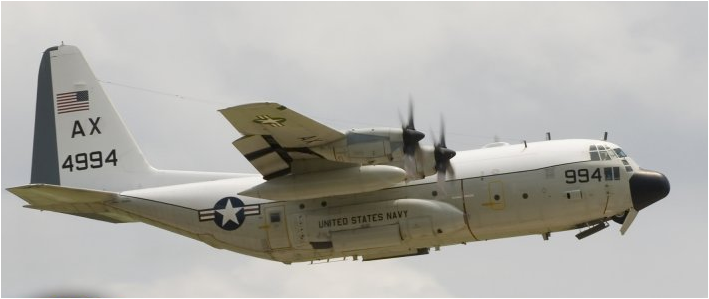
US Navy Lockheed C-130T Hercules

Fleet Logistics Support Squadron 54 (VR-54), nicknamed "The Revelers", is a heavy-transport, logistics support squadron of the United States Navy. It is a Navy Unique Fleet Essential Aircraft (NUFEA) squadron based at NAS/JRB New Orleans, Louisiana and is a sub-command of Commander, Fleet Logistics Support Wing and Commander, Naval Air Reserve Force. VR-54 is a Naval Reserve unit composed of both Training & Administration of the Reserve (TAR formally known as Full-time Support or FTS) and Selected Reserve (SELRES) Sailors. The squadron currently flies the Lockheed C-130T Hercules.

The squadron colors are Purple, Green and Gold which are also the official colors of Mardi Gras derived from the yearly celebration most associated with the squadrons host city of New Orleans.

== Mission ==
The mission of VR-54 is to provide worldwide 24/7 fleet logistics support to all components of the United States Military to include transportation of vehicles, ammunition, personnel, etc. and are able to provide responsive, flexible and rapidly deployable assets in order to maintain peace and combat operations. VR-54 conducts their mission utilizing the Lockheed C-130T Hercules aircraft which is one of the most versatile aircraft in the United States Navy and the world, allowing pilots to take off from practically any surface.

In any given year, VR-54 provides six to eight months of forward detached air logistics support for European, Pacific and Central Commands.

== History ==
The previous squadron designated VR-54 was also based at NAS/JRB New Orleans from 1 October 1972, to 28 February 1981, and flew the C-118 Liftmaster transport aircraft; a military designation of the McDonnell Douglas DC-6. The squadron had a permanent detachment at NAS Atlanta as well. When the Navy introduced the McDonnell Douglas C-9B Skytrain II, the antiquated C-118 was retired and VR-54 was de-commissioned.

Ten years later, VR-54 was re-commissioned on 1 June 1991, as the Navy's first C-130T squadron, ushering in an era that would change Naval Logistics for the decades to come.
