= Fleet Logistics Support Wing =

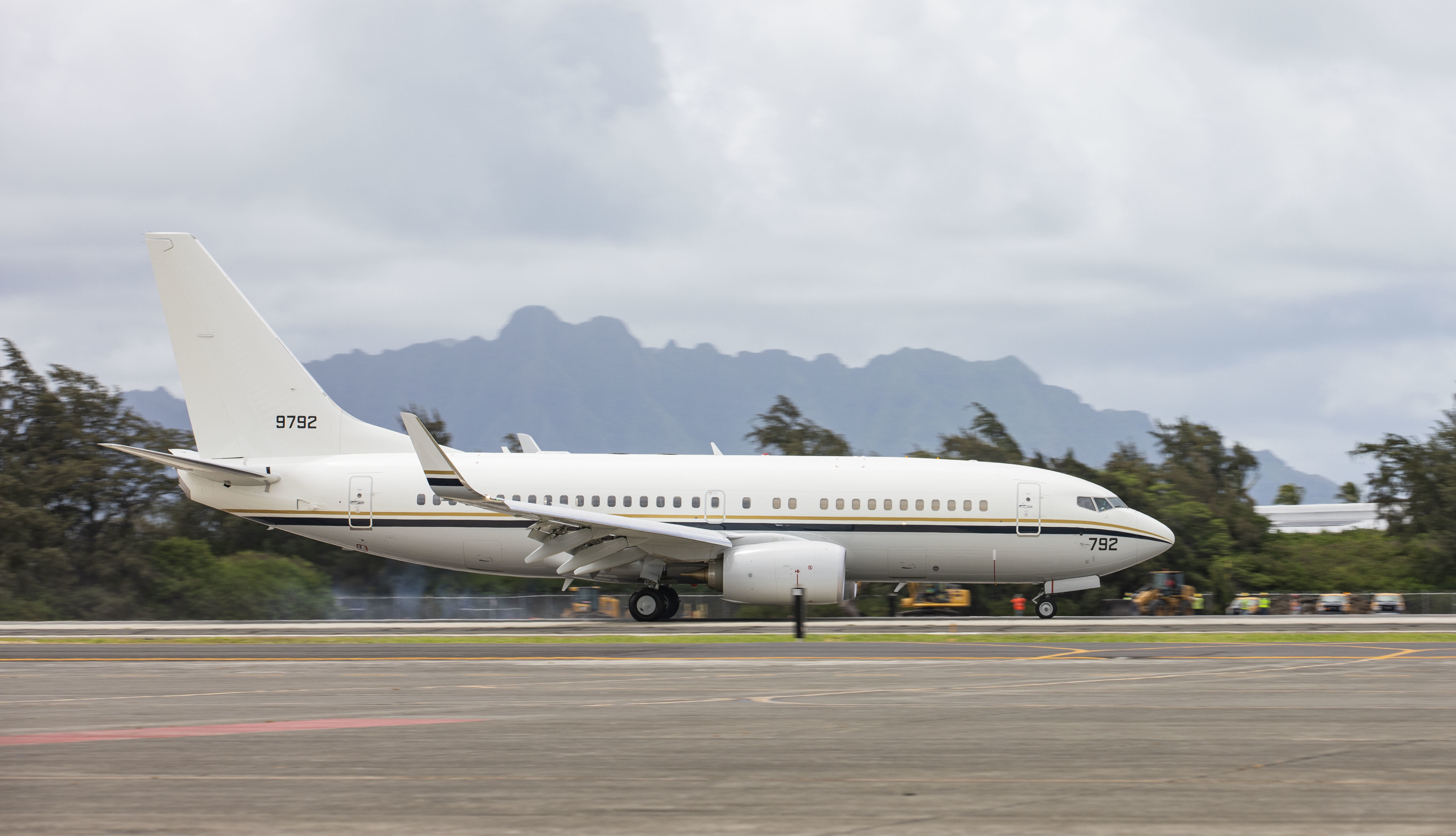
- A C-40A Clipper of the wing's VR-51 lands at MCAS Kaneohe Bay, Hawaii in 2019
- Active: 1974–present (50–51 years)
- Country: United States
- Branch: United States Navy
- Role: Airlift
- Part of: United States Navy Reserve: Naval Air Force Reserve
- Garrison/HQ: NAS JRB Fort Worth, Texas

Insignia
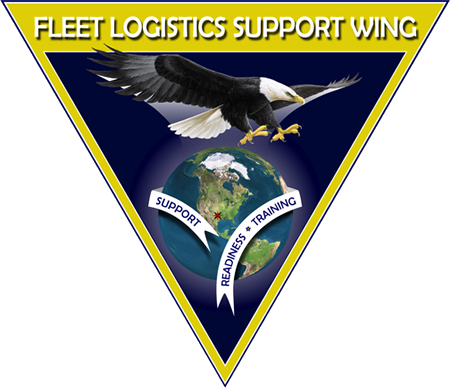
- Fleet Logistics Support Wing emblem

Aircraft flown
- Transport: C-37A Gulfstream V C-37B Gulfstream G550; C-40A Clipper; C-130T Hercules

The Fleet Logistics Support Wing (abbreviated as FLSW, also referred to as Commander, Fleet Logistics Support Wing, CFLSW) is a reserve aircraft wing of the United States Navy, stationed at Naval Air Station Joint Reserve Base Fort Worth, Texas. The wing contains 100 percent of the Navy's intra-theater airlift capability, having no active-duty counterpart. The wing is subordinate to the Commander, Naval Air Force Reserve at Naval Air Station North Island, California.

== History ==
The wing was commissioned at Naval Support Activity New Orleans, Louisiana, in 1974 as the Reserve Tactical Support Wing, before being redesignated to its present name in 1983. Three years later, in 1986, the wing moved headquarters to Naval Air Station Dallas, Texas, before undertaking its most recent relocation to Naval Air Station Joint Reserve Base Fort Worth, Texas, in 1997.

== Units ==
As of 2022, the wing is made up of 12 squadrons, based in 10 locations:

- Fleet Logistics Support Squadron 1 (VR-1), Joint Base Andrews, Maryland
- Fleet Logistics Support Squadron 51 (VR-51), Marine Corps Air Station Kaneohe Bay, Hawaii
- Fleet Logistics Support Squadron 53 (VR-53), Joint Base Andrews, Maryland
- Fleet Logistics Support Squadron 54 (VR-54), Naval Air Station Joint Reserve Base New Orleans, Louisiana
- Fleet Logistics Support Squadron 55 (VR-55), Naval Air Station Point Mugu, California
- Fleet Logistics Support Squadron 56 (VR-56), Naval Air Station Oceana, Virginia
- Fleet Logistics Support Squadron 57 (VR-57), Naval Air Station North Island, California
- Fleet Logistics Support Squadron 58 (VR-58), Naval Air Station Jacksonville, Florida
- Fleet Logistics Support Squadron 59 (VR-59), Naval Air Station Joint Reserve Base Fort Worth, Texas
- Fleet Logistics Support Squadron 61 (VR-61), Naval Air Station Whidbey Island, Washington
- Fleet Logistics Support Squadron 62 (VR-62), Naval Air Station Jacksonville, Florida
- Fleet Logistics Support Squadron 64 (VR-64), Joint Base McGuire–Dix–Lakehurst, New Jersey
