= Joint Operational Support Airlift Center =

Joint Operational Support Airlift Center (JOSAC) is the airlift branch of United States Transportation Command (USTRANSCOM). JOSAC specializes in airlift within the continental United States. JOSAC schedules aircraft assigned to the U.S. Air Force, Air National Guard and Reserve, Army National Guard and Army Reserves and the U.S. Marines.

JOSAC is located at Scott Air Force Base in Illinois. JOSAC was stood up in July 1996 to efficiently schedule to Operational Support Airlift assets of the Air Force, Navy, Marines and Army. Presently there are 80 units in the USA that provide aircraft for JOSAC, providing a fleet of approximately 130 aircraft. Aircraft utilized include the C-21A, C-12, C-26, UC-35, C-20, and C-40.

Schedulers receive requests from travel validators via the JALIS database (Joint Air Logistics System), which is an Oracle-based system developed by the US Navy. JOSAC consists of Military and Civilian personnel based at Scott AFB. JOSAC is run by an Active Duty O6.

There are a number of detachments in various Army National Guards:

Detachment No.	State	Aircraft type
54	Alaska	
5	Alabama	
30	Arkansas	
31	Arizona	
32	California	
	Colorado	
6	Connecticut	
7	Delaware	
4	District of Columbia	
8	Florida	
9	Georgia	
	Guam	
	Hawaii	
34	Iowa	
35	Idaho	
36	Illinois	
10	Indiana	
37	Kansas	

Detachment No.	State	Aircraft type
6	Kentucky	
38	Louisiana	
12	Massachusetts	
13	Maryland	
14	Maine	
15	Michigan	
39	Minnesota	
40	Missouri	
16	Mississippi	
41	Montana	
17	North Carolina	
42	North Dakota	
43	Nebraska	
45	Nevada	
18	New Hampshire	
19	New Jersey	
44	New Mexico	
20	New York	

Detachment No.	State	Aircraft type
	Ohio	
46	Oklahoma	
47	Oregon	
22	Pennsylvania	
56	Puerto Rico	
23	Rhode Island	
24	South Carolina	
48	South Dakota	
25	Tennessee	
49	Texas	
50	Utah	
26	Virginia	
	U.S. Virgin Islands	
27	Vermont	
51	Washington	
	Wisconsin	
28	West Virginia	C-12V
53	Wyoming	
