= VR-61 =

Fleet Logistics Support Squadron 61
- VR-61 Insignia
- Active: 1 October 1982–present (42 years, 5 months)
- Country: United States
- Branch: United States Navy
- Role: Airlift
- Part of: United States Navy Reserve: Fleet Logistics Support Wing
- Garrison/HQ: Naval Air Station Whidbey Island
- Nickname(s): Islanders
- Mascot(s): Eagle

Aircraft flown
- Transport: C-9B Skytrain II (1982–2014); C-40A Clipper (2014–present)

Fleet Logistics Support Squadron 61 (VR-61), nicknamed Islanders, is a transport squadron of the Fleet Logistics Support Wing of the United States Navy Reserve, based at Naval Air Station Whidbey Island, Washington. It is a reserve unit composed of both active duty and Selected Reserve sailors. The squadron maintains three modified Boeing Next-Generation 737-700C aircraft, designated as the C-40A Clipper.

"VR-61 compiled more than 126,000 mishap-free flight hours while flying its previously assigned four C-9B aircraft. The squadron has received the Meritorious Unit Commendation, Navy Unit Commendation, two Congressman Bill Chappell awards, eight Safety "S" awards, four Battle "E" awards, four retention awards and the James M. Holcombe Maintenance Award."

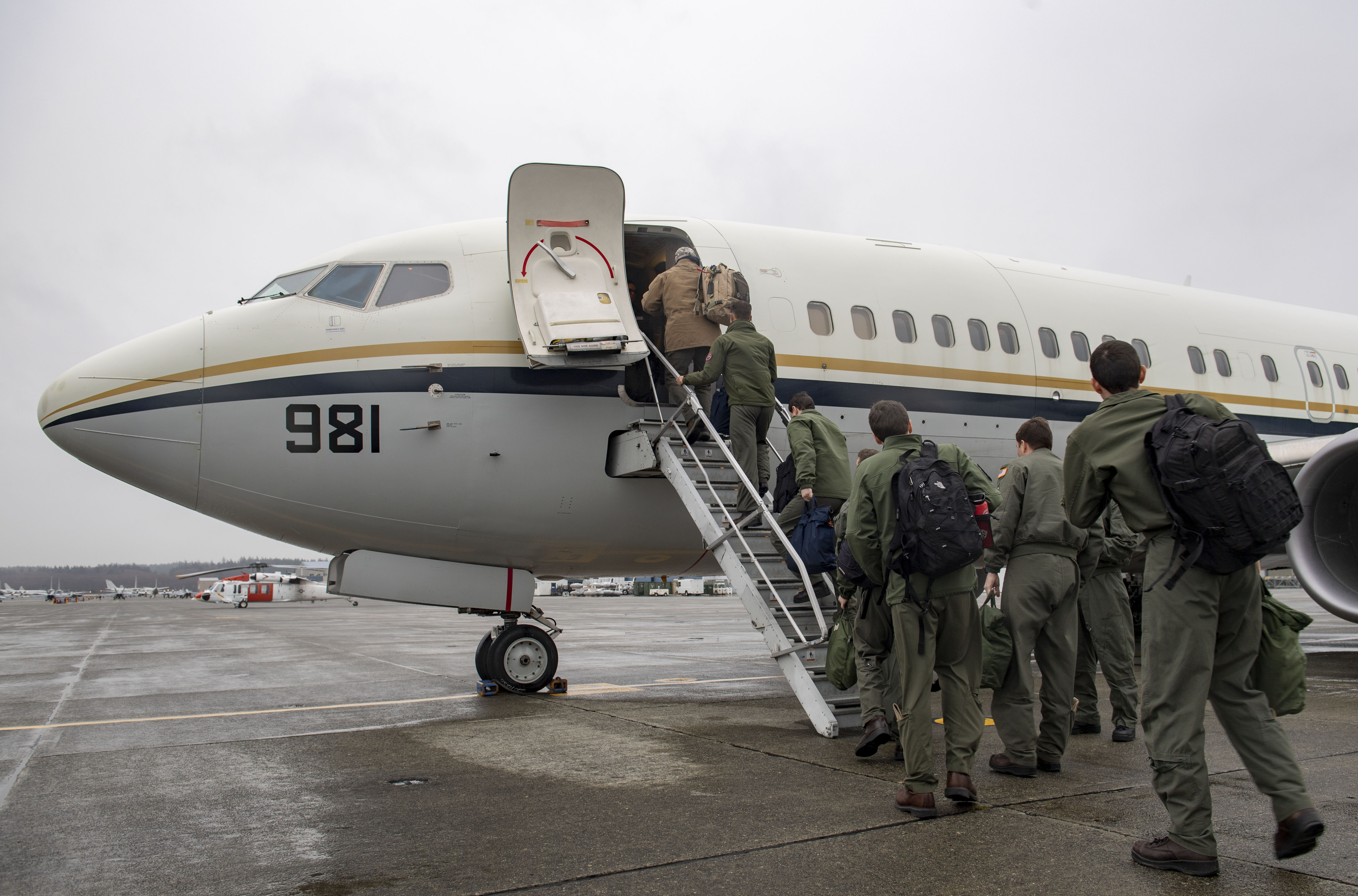
C-40A Clipper aircraft maintained by VR-61

== See also ==
- History of the United States Navy
- List of United States Navy aircraft squadrons
