= VR-51 =

Fleet Logistics Support Squadron 51
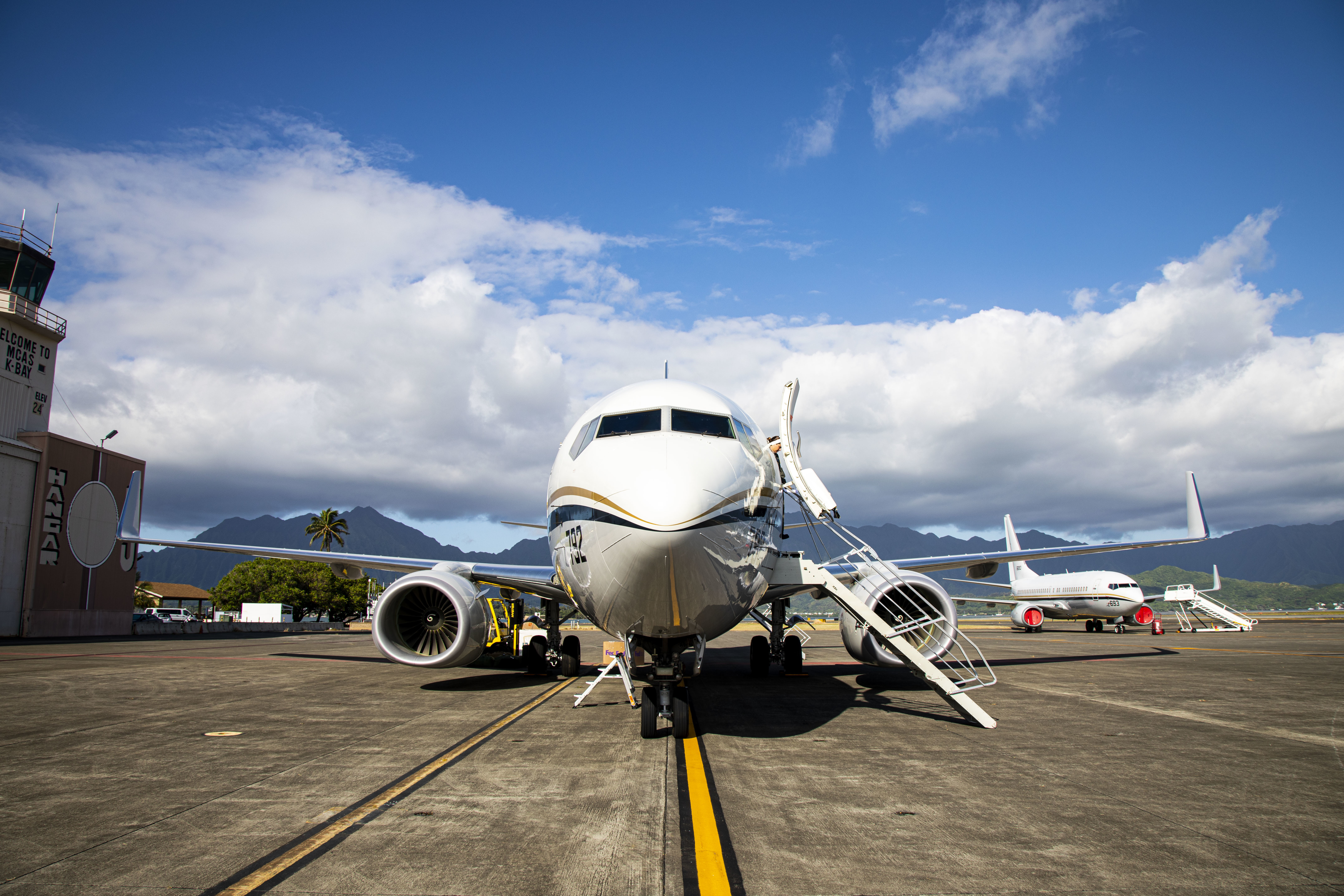
- A squadron C-40 Clipper on the ramp at MCAS Kaneohe Bay in 2020
- Active: 1 June 1997 – present
- Country: United States
- Branch: United States Navy
- Role: Airlift
- Part of: United States Navy Reserve: Fleet Logistics Support Wing
- Garrison/HQ: MCAS Kaneohe Bay, Hawaii
- Nickname(s): Windjammers

Insignia
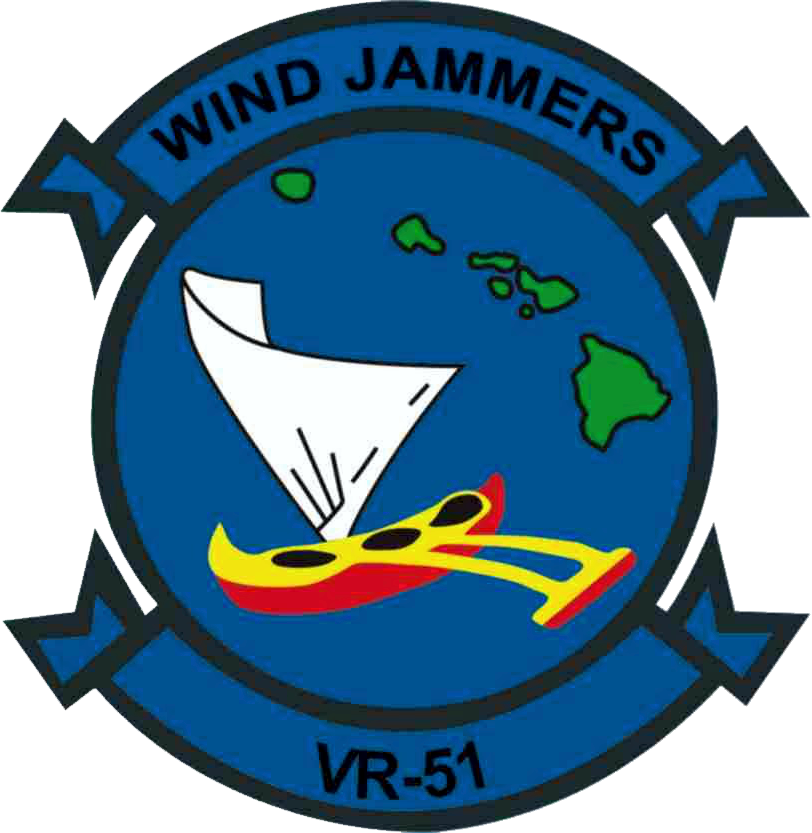
- VR-51 Squadron Insignia

Aircraft flown
- Transport: Boeing C-40A Clipper

Fleet Logistics Support Squadron 51 (VR-51), nicknamed the Windjammers, is a United States Navy Reserve transport squadron of the United States Navy's Fleet Logistics Support Wing, stationed at Marine Corps Air Station Kaneohe Bay, Hawaii. It is a reserve unit composed of both active duty and Selected Reserve sailors. The squadron maintains two Boeing 737-700C aircraft, designated as the C-40A Clipper, having received their first C-40 in May 2019, with the second one arriving in July. Previously, the squadron operated the Gulfstream C-20G.

== See also ==
- History of the United States Navy
- List of United States Navy aircraft squadrons
