= VR-56 =

Fleet Logistics Support Squadron 56
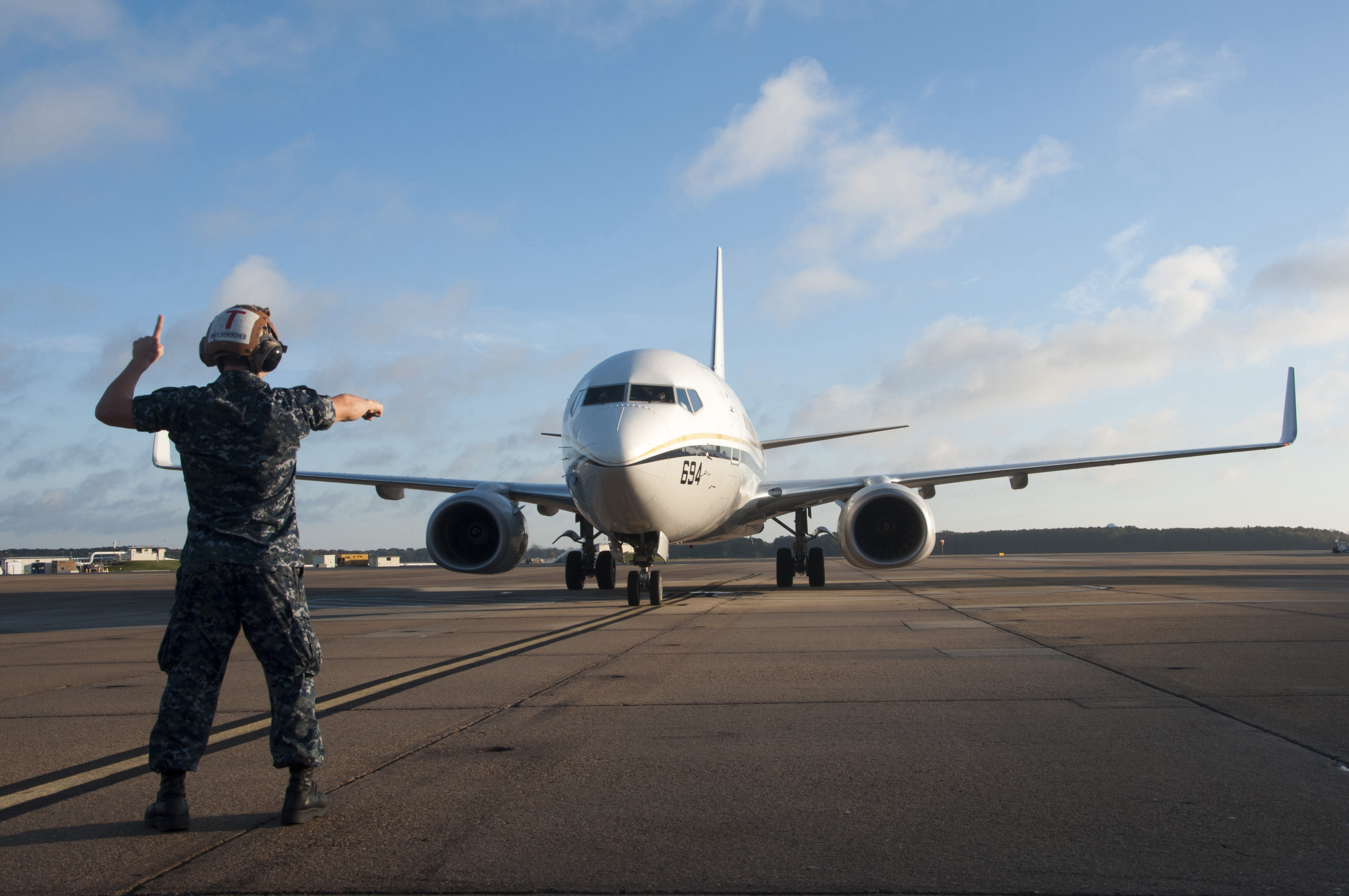
- A squadron C-40 Clipper on the ramp at NAS Oceana in 2015
- Active: 1 July 1976 – present
- Country: United States
- Branch: United States Navy
- Role: Airlift
- Part of: United States Navy Reserve: Fleet Logistics Support Wing
- Garrison/HQ: NAS Oceana
- Nickname(s): Globemasters

Insignia
- VR-56 Squadron Insignia

Aircraft flown
- Transport: Boeing C-40A Clipper

Fleet Logistics Support Squadron 56 (VR-56), nicknamed the Globemasters, is a transport squadron of the United States Navy Reserve providing world-wide airlift using C-40A Clipper aircraft and is based at Naval Air Station Oceana, Virginia. The squadron is under the operational control of Commander, Fleet Logistics Support Wing at Naval Air Station Joint Reserve Base Fort Worth, Texas.

VR-56 is a reserve unit composed of both full-time active duty and traditional part-time Selected Reserve officers and sailors.

The squadron previously flew the C-9B Skytrain II aircraft at Naval Station Norfolk/Chambers Field, Virginia before relocating to Naval Air Station Oceana, Virginia. VR-56 later retired its C-9B aircraft and is one of six VR squadrons that now flies and maintains three Boeing Next-Generation 737-700C aircraft designated as the C-40A Clipper.

== See also ==
- History of the United States Navy
- List of United States Navy aircraft squadrons
