= VR-59 =

Fleet Logistics Support Squadron Five Nine (VR-59)
- VR-59 Squadron Insignia
- Active: 1 October 1982 – present (42 years, 6 months)
- Country: United States
- Branch: United States Navy
- Part of: United States Navy Reserve
- Nickname(s): The Lone Star Express

Aircraft flown
- Transport: Boeing C-40 Clipper

Fleet Logistics Support Squadron 59 (VR-59), nicknamed The Lone Star Express, is a transport squadron of the Fleet Logistics Support Wing of the United States Navy Reserve, based at Naval Air Station Joint Reserve Base Fort Worth, Texas. It is a reserve unit composed of both active duty and Selected Reserve sailors. The squadron maintains three modified Boeing Next-Generation 737-700C aircraft, designated as the C-40A Clipper.

== Mission ==
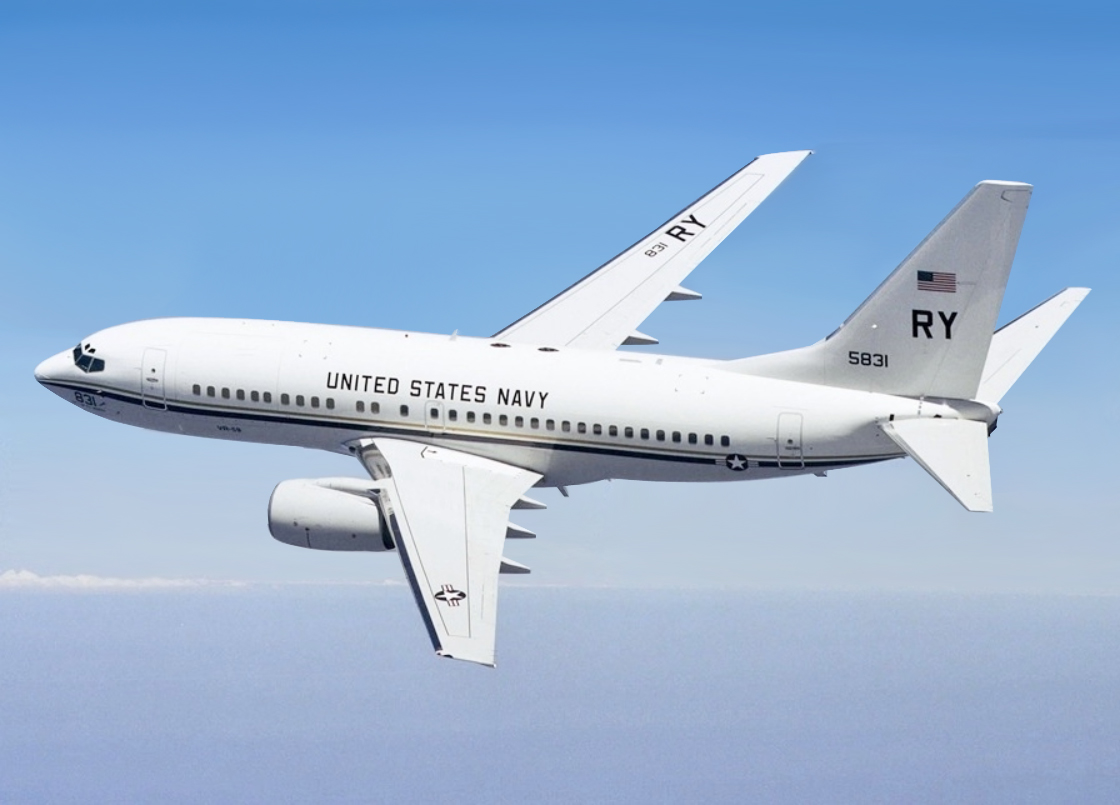
C-40A Clipper aircraft maintained by VR-59 squadron

The mission statement of VR-59 is "Navy unique fleet essential airlift providing around the clock worldwide logistics support to all military services, flying three C-40A Clippers."

== See also ==
- History of the United States Navy
- List of United States Navy aircraft squadrons
- List of Inactive United States Navy aircraft squadrons
