= VR-64 =

Fleet Logistics Support Squadron 64
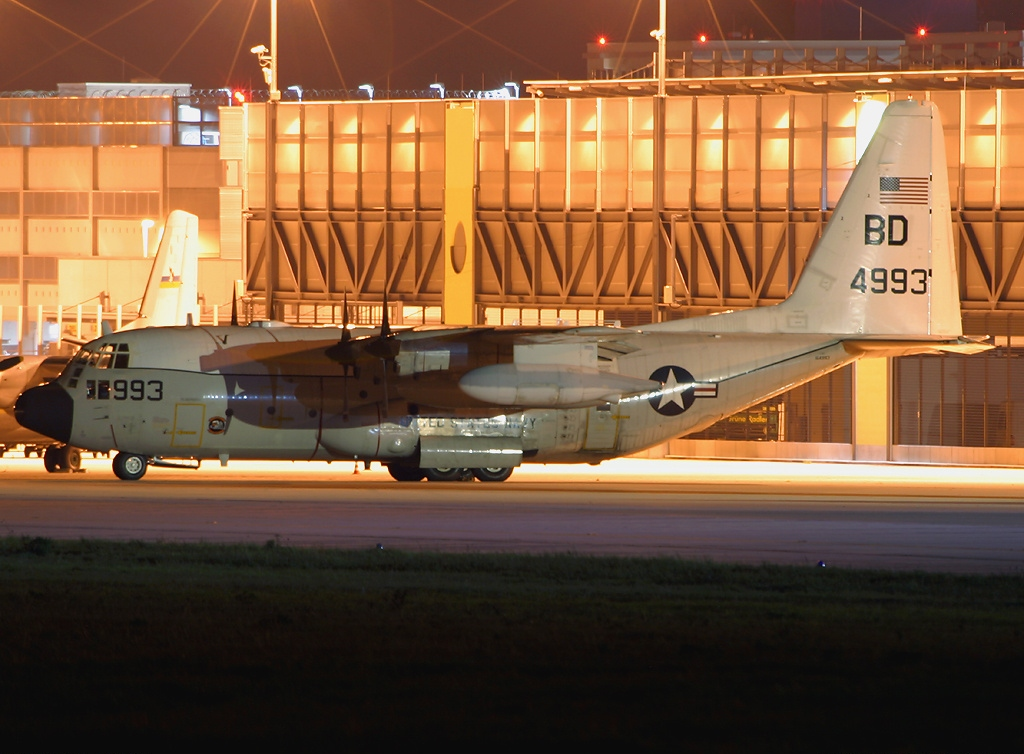
- C-130T Hercules of the squadron at Stuttgart Airport
- Active: 1 November 1970 – present (54 years, 4 months)
- Country: United States
- Branch: United States Navy
- Type: Squadron
- Role: Logistics
- Part of: United States Navy Reserve: Fleet Logistics Support Wing
- Garrison/HQ: Fort Dix, New Jersey
- Nickname(s): Condors, Flying Chicken

Insignia
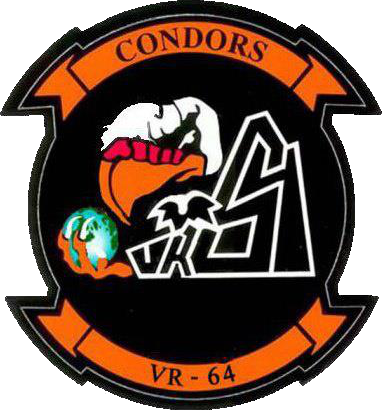
- Fleet Logistics Support Squadron 64 emblem

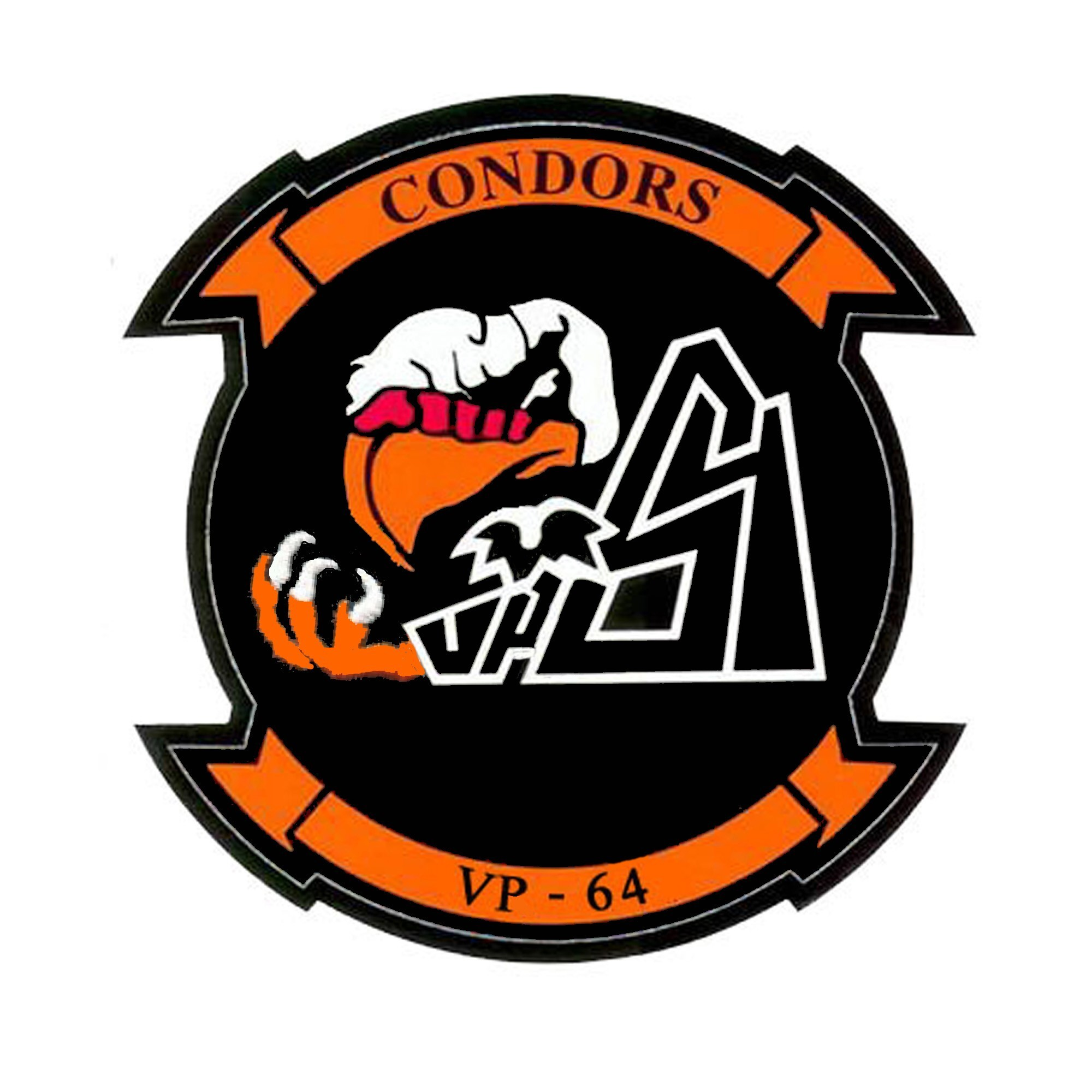
- Patrol Squadron 64 emblem

Aircraft flown
- Transport: C-130T

Fleet Logistics Support Squadron 64 (VR-64), nicknamed the Condors, is a logistics squadron of the U.S. Navy Reserve, based at the Fort Dix entity of Joint Base McGuire–Dix–Lakehurst. The squadron was established as Patrol Squadron 64 (VP-64) on 1 November 1970 and redesignated on 18 September 2004, after 34 years of service. It was based at NAS Willow Grove, Pennsylvania until it was transferred to the Fort Dix element of Joint Base McGuire–Dix–Lakehurst in 2011. Units of the squadron made 26 major overseas deployments.

== Operational history ==
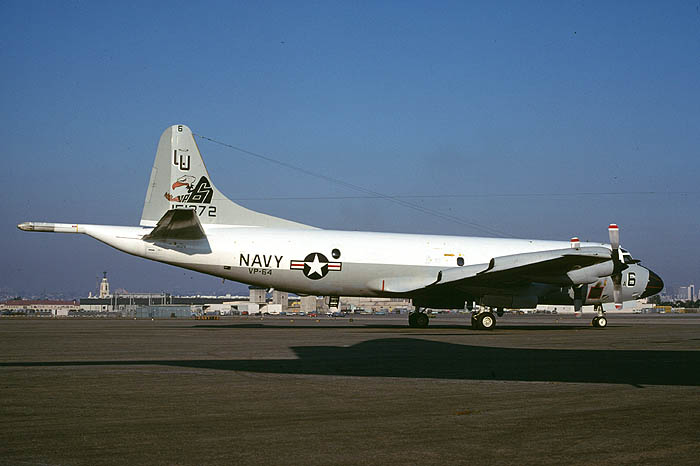
VP-64 P-3A at NAS North Island, November 1983

- 1 Nov 1970: VP-64 was established as a reserve patrol squadron at NAS Willow Grove, under the operational control of Reserve Patrol Wings, Atlantic. VP-64 was established from previously existing reserve VPs—66W1-W3, 21W4, 26W5 and 23W6—as a result of a major reorganization of the Naval Air Reserve that took place in 1970. The 12 Naval Reserve patrol squadrons formed were structured along the lines of Regular Navy patrol squadrons with nearly identical organization and manning levels. The concept, known as the 12/2/1 had 12 Reserve VP squadrons under two commands, Commander Fleet Air Reserve Wings Atlantic and Commander Fleet Air Reserve Wings Pacific, both under the control of one central authority, Commander Naval Air Reserve. These commands would later be redesignated as Commander, Reserve Patrol Wing Atlantic; Commander, Reserve Patrol Wing Pacific; and Commander, Naval Air Reserve Force. VP-64 was initially equipped with 12 Lockheed SP-2H Neptune aircraft, 60 officers and 323 enlisted personnel.
- June 1973–June 1974: The squadron's first Lockheed P-3A DIFAR Orion arrived. Transition training for aircrews was completed in June 1974.
- 7 February 1977: VP-64 participated in Anti-submarine warfare (ASW) operations with CTG 84.3 in the Mediterranean for a period of three days. The squadron was awarded a Meritorious Unit Commendation on 1 December 1977 for its performance.
- October 1982–October 1983: Crew transition training to the P-3A TAC/NAV MOD airframe was begun and completed in October 1983. The TAC/NAV MOD version replaced the ASN-42 navigation and tactical display systems with the LTN-72 inertial and Omega navigation systems and digital computer.
- January 1987: Perimeter security at NAS Willow Grove was breached by a peace activist group. Several members of the group were able to damage one of the squadron's aircraft before base security was able to respond.
- 1990: VP-64 traded in their 10 P-3A Orions for eight P-3B TAC/NAV MOD aircraft. The IRDS/HACLS modifications added infrared detection. The completion of these modifications gave squadron aircraft a Harpoon launch capability. The Harpoon missile capability was originally intended specifically for the elimination of Soviet surveillance trawlers and Echo II cruise missile submarines in the event of war, the Echo II having to surface in order to fire its SS-N-3 Shaddock missiles.
- April–May 1993: VP-64 deployed to Nimes, France, in support of joint French-American ASW exercises. A detachment was maintained at RNAS Souda Bay, Crete. Several crews were put on alert status at Naval Air Station Sigonella, Sicily, during the period of heightened tensions in the former Yugoslavian Republic in support of UN sanctions.
- January–March 1994: VP-64 deployed several detachments to Naval Station Roosevelt Roads, Puerto Rico, in support of Operation Uphold Democracy. The detachments assisted in supporting UN sanctions against Haiti.
- April 1994: VP-64 began the transition from the P-3B to the P-3C Update II. It incorporated the latest in avionics and weapons systems, including a turret-mounted infrared detection device to drop out of the nose to identify targets day or night.
- July–September 1995: VP-64 deployed several detachments to NAVSTA Roosevelt Roads, in support of DoD counter-narcotics patrols in the Caribbean theater. During this period the Condors assisted in the tracking and seizure of narcotics shipments estimated at a street value of $2.5 billion.

== Aircraft assignment ==
The squadron first received the following aircraft on the dates shown:

- SP-2H Neptune – November 1970
- P-3A DIFAR Orion – June 1973
- P-3A TAC/NAV MOD Orion – June 1982
- P-3B TAC/NAV MOD Orion – 1990
- P-3C UII Orion – April 1994 - September 2004
- C-130T Hercules - September 2004 - Present

== See also ==
- Maritime patrol aircraft
- List of Lockheed P-3 Orion variants
- List of inactive United States Navy aircraft squadrons
- List of United States Navy aircraft squadrons
- List of squadrons in the Dictionary of American Naval Aviation Squadrons
- History of the United States Navy
