= Boeing C-40 =

Military executive transport aircraft series

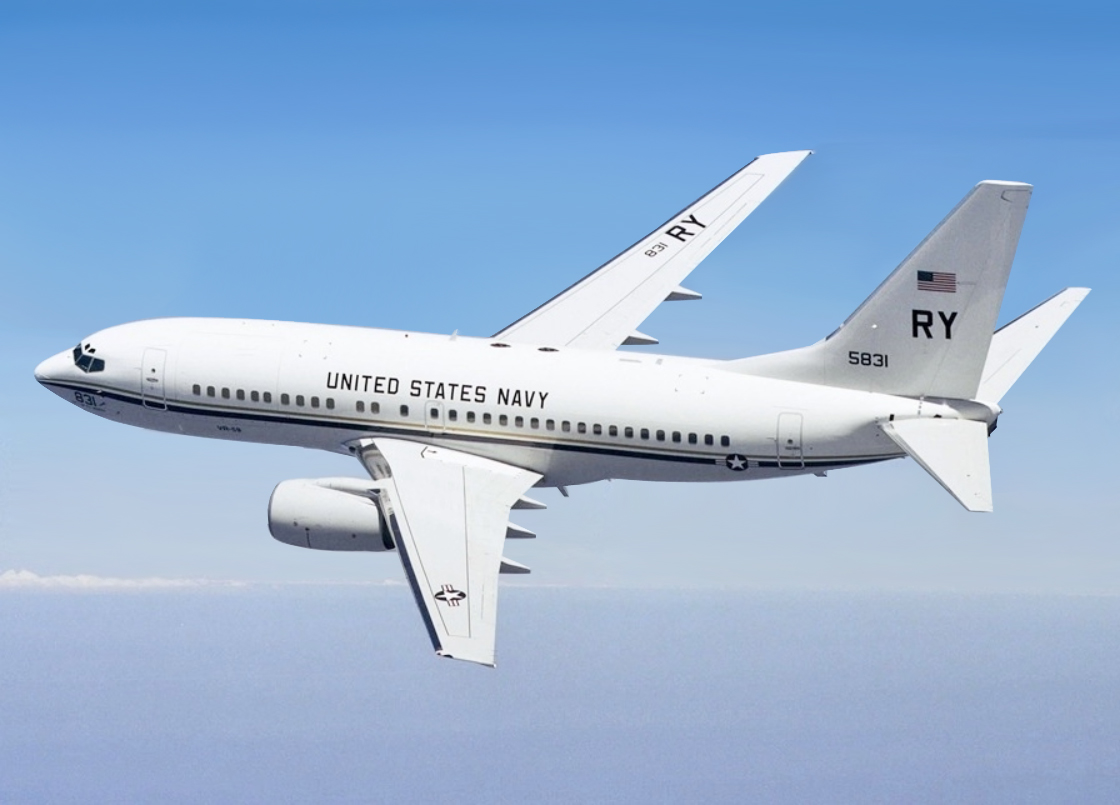
- C-40A Clipper owned by the U.S. Navy and operated by Fleet Logistics Support Squadron 59

General information
- Type: Military transport aircraft
- National origin: United States
- Manufacturer: Boeing
- Status: In service
- Primary users: United States Navy United States Air Force; United States Marine Corps
- Number built: 28

History
- Manufactured: 2001–2019
- Introduction date: 21 April 2001
- First flight: April 2000
- Developed from: Boeing 737 Next Generation

The Boeing C-40 is a military transport aircraft derived from the Boeing 737 Next Generation. It is used by the United States Navy, United States Air Force, and United States Marine Corps to transport high-priority cargo and passengers. The Navy's variant is designated the C-40A Clipper, while the Air Force's C-40B and C-40C variants do not have official names.

== Design and development ==
The C-40 combines the Boeing 737-700 fuselage with the strengthened wings and landing gear of the larger and heavier 737-800. It also has auxiliary fuel tanks allowing an unrefueled range of up to 5,000 nautical miles (9,300 km; 5,800 mi) compared with 3,010 nmi (5,570 km; 3,460 mi) for the standard 737-700.

=== C-40A ===
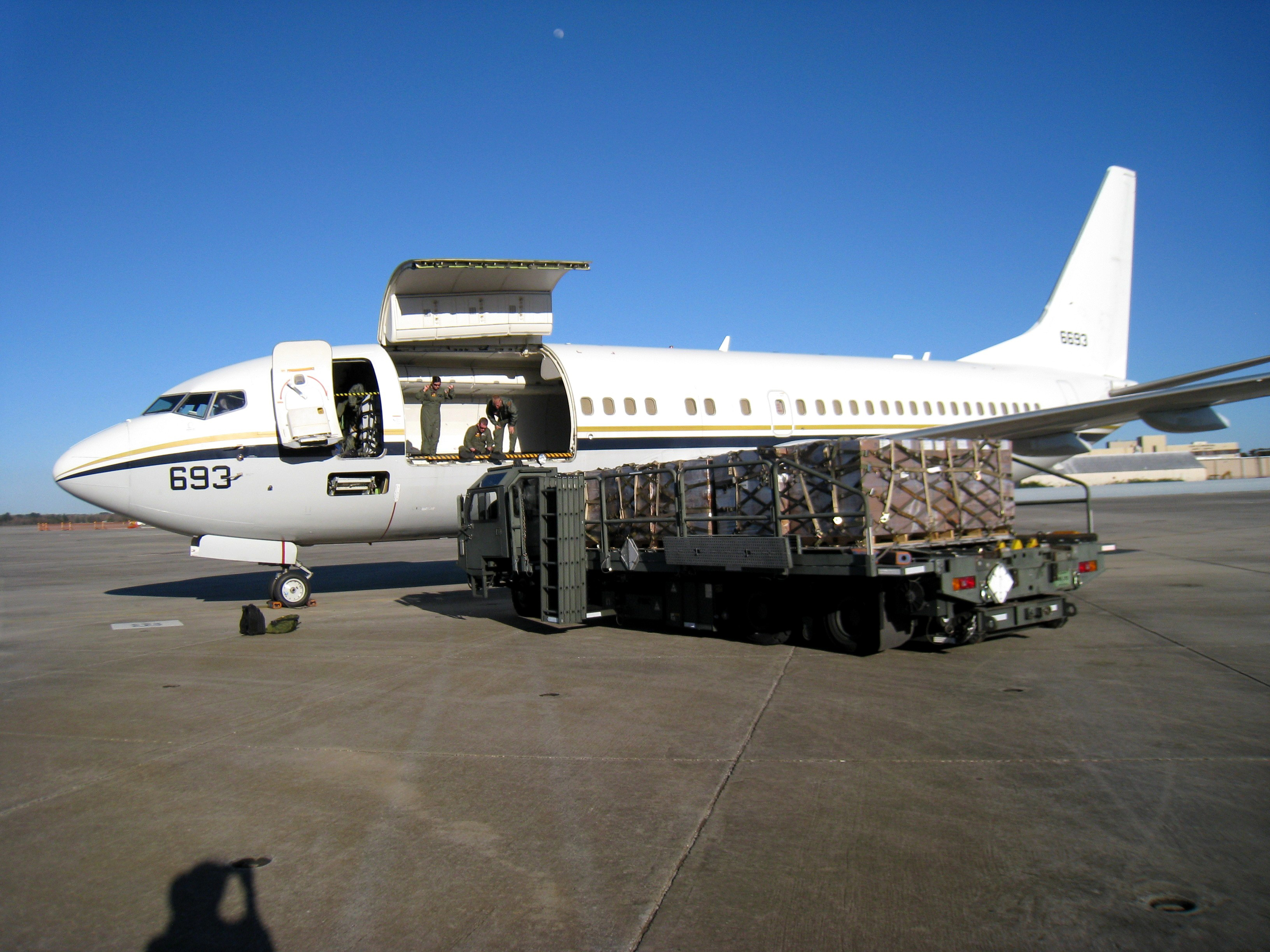
US Navy C-40A Clipper being loaded with cargo at Naval Air Station Jacksonville

First flight took place in April 2000 and the first of the C-40A aircraft entered service in April 2001.

The U.S. Navy Reserve was the first customer for a 737 Next Generation based "combi" aircraft (capable of transporting cargo and passengers). The Clipper was ordered by the U.S. Navy to replace its fleet of aging C-9B Skytrain IIs. The C-40A was the first new logistics aircraft in 17 years to join the U.S. Navy Reserve. The Navy Reserve provides all of the Navy's medium and heavy airlift capabilities. The Clipper meets or exceeds international noise and environmental requirements, which the fleet of Naval Reserve C-9s did not. It is also more fuel-efficient and offers increased range and payload capabilities. The Clipper is certified to operate in an all-passenger (121 passengers), all-cargo or combination ("combi") configuration that can accommodate up to three cargo pallets and 70 passengers on the main deck.

The Navy purchased the airplanes using standard commercial practices, ordering six of the 737-700C models. The first two of four aircraft were delivered on 21 April 2001 to Fleet Logistics Support Squadron Five Nine (VR-59) at the Naval Air Station/Joint Reserve Base Fort Worth, Texas, with two more aircraft following before the end of the year. The fifth and sixth aircraft were delivered in August 2002 to VR-58 at the Naval Air Station Jacksonville, Florida. Further aircraft have been delivered to VR-57 at the Naval Air Station North Island, California. The C-40A provides superior fuel efficiency, range and payload compared to the C-9B aircraft it replaced.

In the 2018 Marine Aviation Plan, the U.S. Marine Corps indicated that it intended to acquire two C-40A aircraft for airlift missions, replacing its Skytrain fleet. On 4 December 2018 an online notice was posted by the Marines seeking a supplier of C-40s to be delivered in 2020. The USMC Skytrains were retired in 2017 and to prepare for the transition to new aircraft, personnel from Marine Transport Squadron One were assigned to operate Navy Clippers until the arrival of their own aircraft.

=== C-40B ===
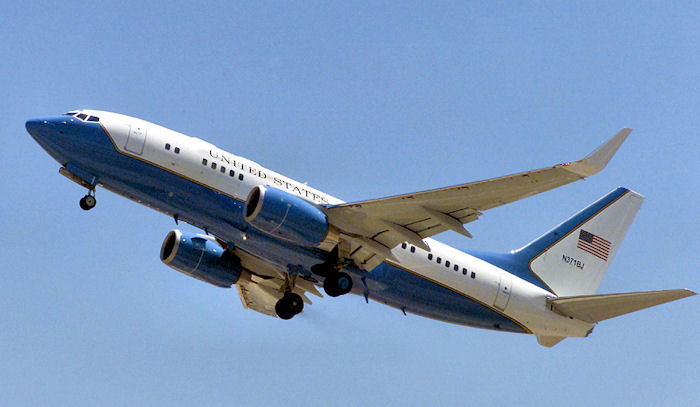
US Air Force C-40B operated by the 89th Airlift Wing

The United States Air Force selected the C-40B, a military version of the 737-700 Boeing Business Jet, to replace the aging fleet of C-137 aircraft used to transport U.S. combatant commanders. The Air Force awarded the medium lift contract in August 2000.

The 89th Airlift Wing acquired its first C-40B aircraft in December 2002. Both units are based at Andrews Air Force Base, Maryland. The 15th Airlift Wing, Hickam AFB, Hawaii, acquired its C-40B for U.S. Pacific Command in February 2003. The 86th Airlift Wing, Ramstein AB, Germany, acquired its C-40B for U.S. Air Forces in Europe in December 2004.

The cabin area is equipped with a crew rest area, distinguished visitor compartment with sleep accommodations, two galleys and business class seating with worktables. The C-40B is designed to be an "office in the sky" for senior military and government leaders. The aircraft features two-way broadband data communications, including secure voice and data communication; elements include internet and network access, telephones, satellites, facsimile and copy machines. The C-40B also has a computer-based passenger data system.

=== C-40C ===
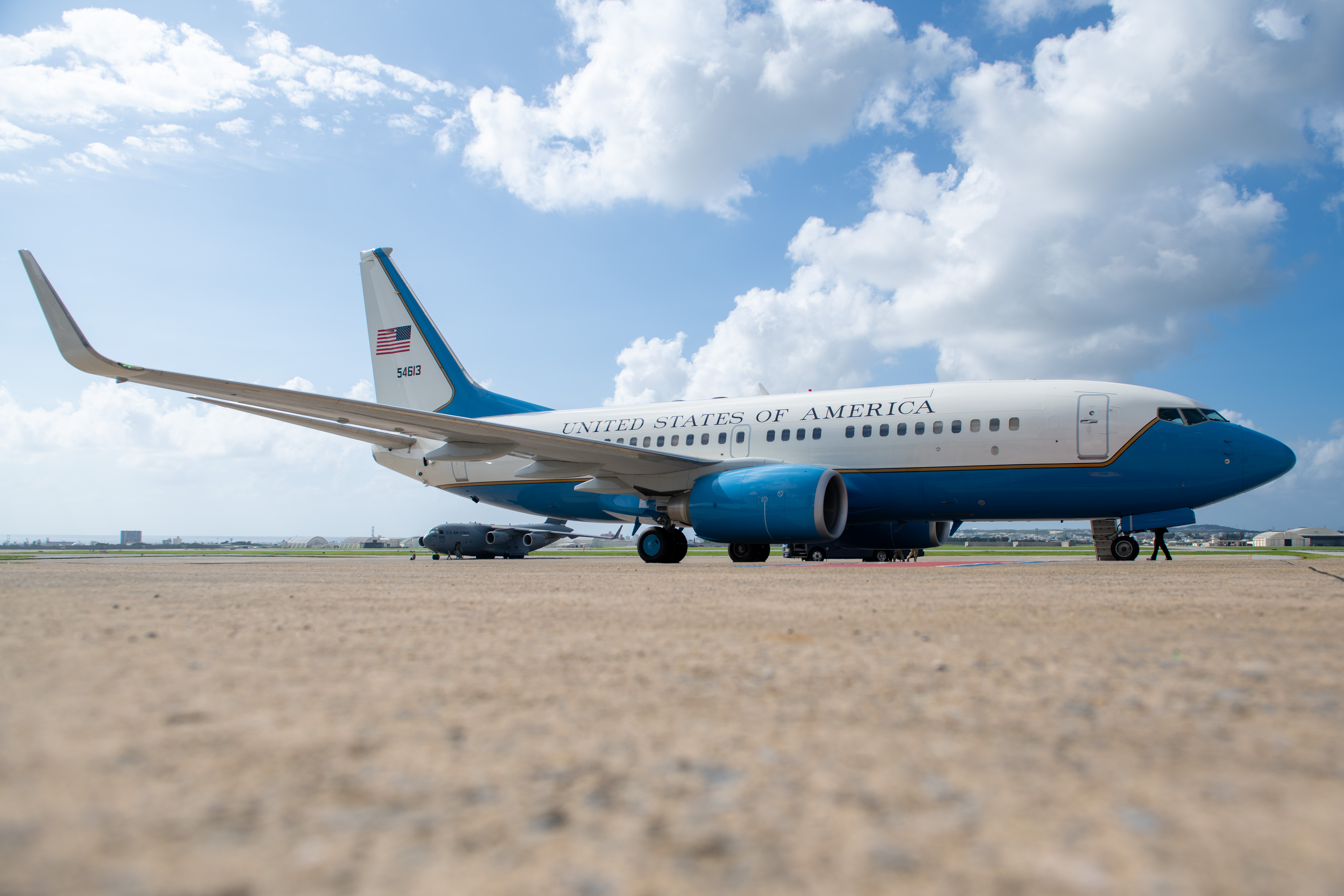
US Air Force C-40C at Kadena Air Base

The C-40C is a VIP transport aircraft often used to carry members of the Cabinet and Congress, and was purchased to replace the Boeing C-22. The aircraft is equipped similarly to the C-40B, but without the advanced communications capabilities. Unique to the C-40C is the capability to change its configuration to accommodate from 42 to 111 passengers.

The C-40C replaced three C-22s (a militarized Boeing 727) operated by the Air National Guard and National Guard Bureau to airlift personnel. The C-40C was the first military aircraft to be acquired in this as an off-the-shelf aircraft for the Department of Defense. The 201st Airlift Squadron, District of Columbia Air National Guard acquired two C-40C aircraft in October 2002. The Air Force Reserve 932d Airlift Wing, Scott AFB, Illinois acquired three C-40C aircraft in 2007.

== Variants ==
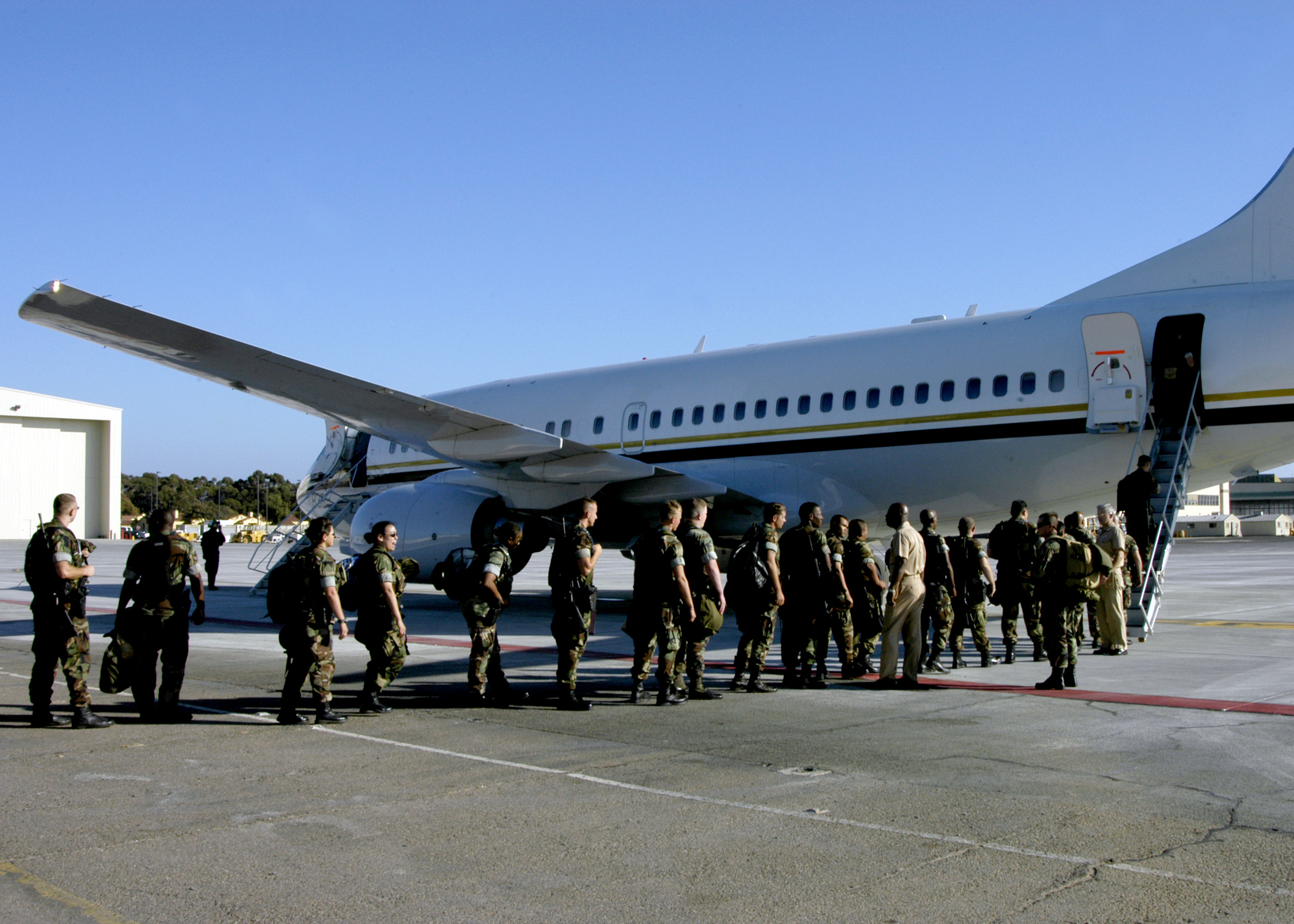
A United States Navy C-40A from Fleet Logistics Support Squadron (VR) 57, at NAS North Island

C-40A Clipper
United States Navy version of the Boeing 737-700 for high-priority cargo and passenger transport, seventeen built.
C-40B
United States Air Force version of the Boeing 737-700 based Boeing Business Jet modified as a special mission aircraft for commanders and government officials, four built.
C-40C
United States Air Force version of the Boeing 737-700 based Boeing Business Jet,
operational support and transport aircraft, seven built.

== Operators ==
United States

- United States Air Force
  - 89th Airlift Wing – Andrews AFB, Maryland
    - 1st Airlift Squadron
  - 113th Wing – Andrews AFB, Maryland
    - 201st Airlift Squadron
  - 375th Air Mobility Wing – Scott AFB, Illinois
    - 54th Airlift Squadron
  - 932nd Airlift Wing – Scott AFB, Illinois
    - 73rd Airlift Squadron
- United States Navy
  - Fleet Logistics Support Wing
    - VR-51 – MCAS Kaneohe Bay, Hawaii
    - VR-56 – NAS Oceana, Virginia
    - VR-57 – NAS North Island, California
    - VR-58 – NAS Jacksonville, Florida
    - VR-59 – NAS JRB Fort Worth, Texas
    - VR-61 – NAS Whidbey Island, Washington
- United States Marine Corps
  - Marine Aircraft Group 41
    - VMR-1 – NAS JRB Fort Worth, Texas

== Specifications ==
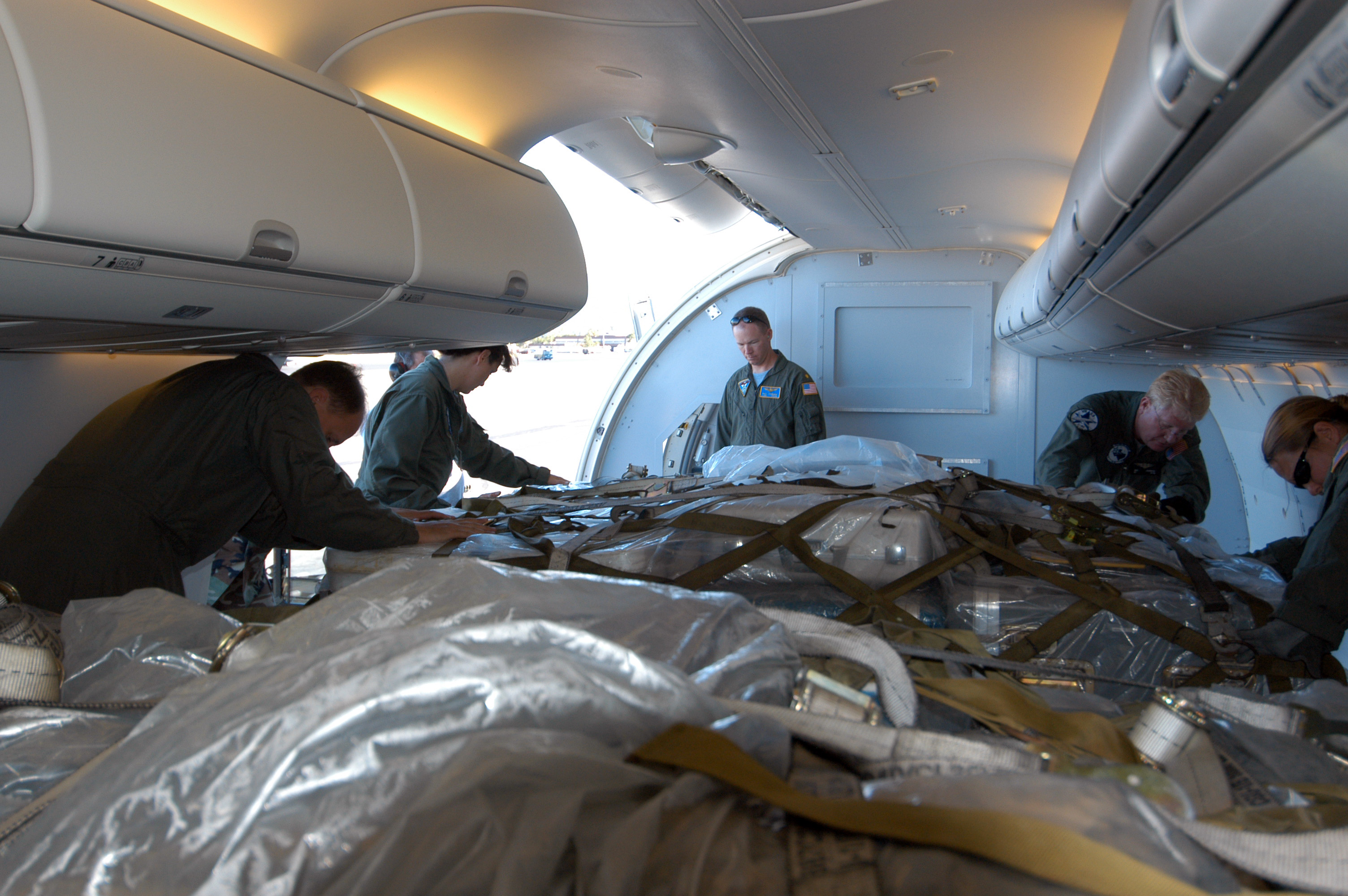
C-40A transporting palletized humanitarian cargo, 2005.

Data from

General characteristics

- Crew: Four, five or six: Pilot, co-pilot, crew chief and loadmaster, plus one 'second loadmaster' when carrying passengers or two when carrying over 100 passengers
- Capacity:
  - C-40A passenger configuration: 121 passengers
  - C-40A cargo configuration: 8 pallets
  - C-40A combination configuration: 3 pallets, 70 passengers
  - C-40B: 26 to 32 passengers
  - C-40C: 42 to 111 passengers
  - Payload: 40,000 lb (18,144 kg)
- Length: 110 ft 4 in (33.63 m)
- Wingspan: 112 ft 7 in (34.32 m)
- Height: 41 ft 2 in (12.55 m)
- Airfoil: root: BAC 449/450/451; tip: BAC 442 mod
- Empty weight: 126,000 lb (57,153 kg)
- Max takeoff weight: 171,000 lb (77,564 kg)
- Fuel capacity: 6,875 US gal (26,020 L; 5,725 imp gal)
- Powerplant: 2 × CFM International CFM56-7B turbofan engines, 27,300 lbf (121 kN) thrust each

Performance

- Maximum speed: 534 kn (615 mph, 989 km/h)
- Range: 3,200 nmi (3,700 mi, 5,900 km) (C-40A), 4,500–5,000 nmi (5,200–5,800 mi; 8,300–9,300 km) (C-40B/C)
- Service ceiling: 41,000 ft (12,000 m)
- Thrust/weight: 0.407

== See also ==
Related development

- Boeing 737
- Boeing E-7 Wedgetail
- Boeing P-8 Poseidon
- Boeing T-43
- Boeing Business Jet

Related lists

- List of active United States military aircraft
- List of military aircraft of the United States
