= Naval Station Norfolk Chambers Field =

Military airport in Norfolk, Virginia

Chambers Field
- Part of Naval Station Norfolk
- Norfolk, Virginia in the United States
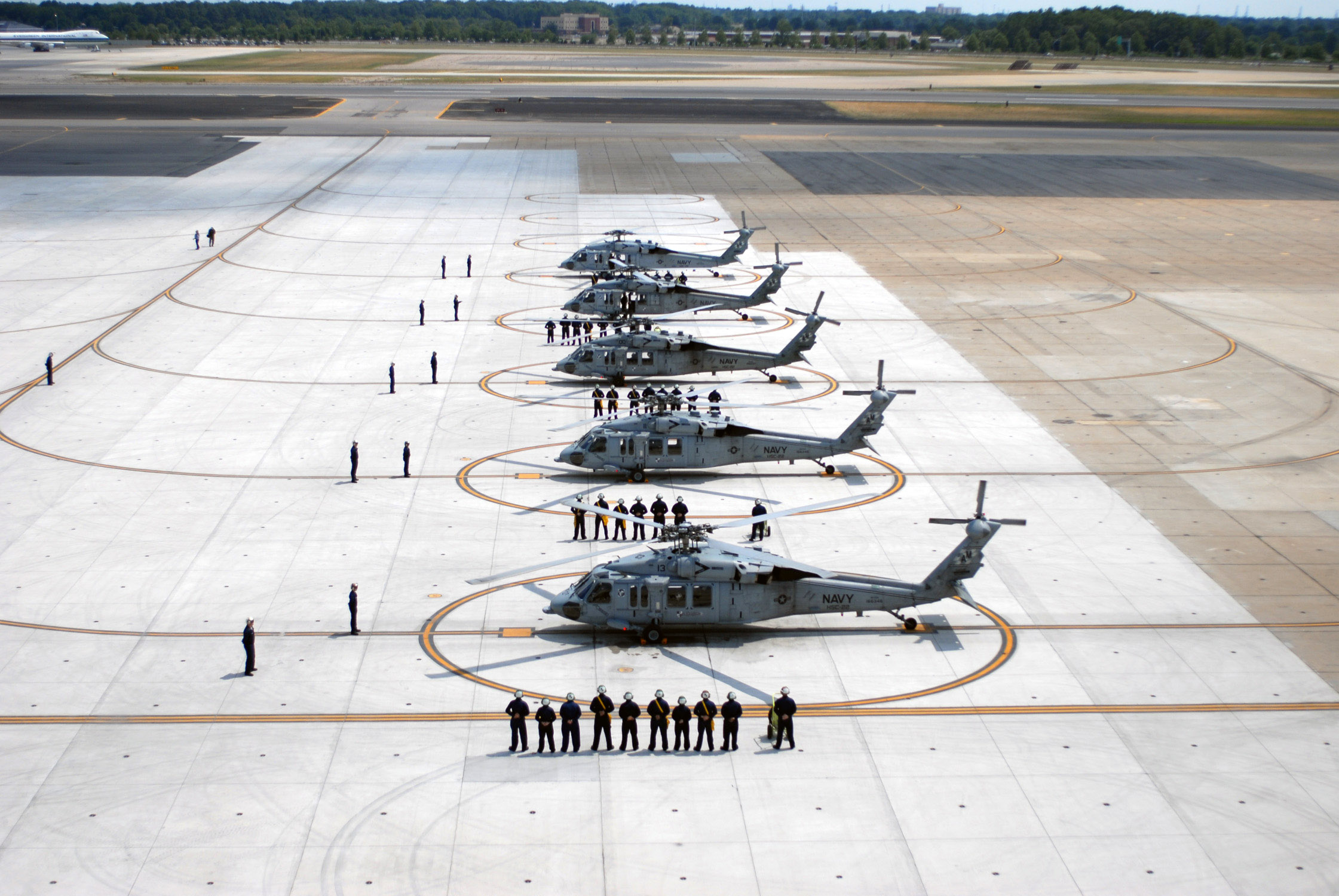
- MH-60S Seahawks of HSC-22 prepare for take off at Chambers Field

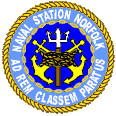

Site information
- Type: Naval Air Station
- Owner: Department of Defense
- Operator: US Navy
- Controlled by: Navy Region Mid-Atlantic
- Condition: Operational

Location
- Location in the United States
- Coordinates: 36°56′14.8″N 76°17′18.6″W

Site history
- Built: 1917 (as NAS Norfolk)
- In use: 1917 – present

Garrison information
- Current commander: Captain David Dees
- Garrison: Helicopter Sea Combat Wing Atlantic

Airfield information
- Identifiers: IATA: NGU, ICAO: KNGU, FAA LID: NGU, WMO: 723085
- Elevation: 4.5 metres (15 ft) AMSL
Runways
Direction	Length and surface
10/28	2,551.1 metres (8,370 ft) Asphalt

Naval Station Norfolk Chambers Field (IATA: NGU, ICAO: KNGU, FAA LID: NGU), or LP-1/Chambers Field, commonly known as Chambers Field, is named after Captain Washington Irving Chambers. It is a military airport in Norfolk, Virginia, that is a part of Naval Station Norfolk. It supports naval air forces in the United States Fleet Forces Command, those operating in the Atlantic Ocean, Mediterranean Sea, and Indian Ocean. "Chambers Field" only refers to the geographical area of the airport runway, taxiways, two heliports and six helipads.

== History ==
NAS (Naval Air Station) Norfolk started its roots training aviators at Naval Air Detachment, Curtiss Field, Newport News, on May 19, 1917. Approximately five months later, with a staff increasing to five officers, three aviators, ten enlisted sailors and seven aircraft, the detachment was renamed Naval Air Detachment, Naval Operating Base, Hampton Roads. The aircraft, all seaplanes, were flown across the James River and moored to stakes in the water until canvas hangars were constructed. The new location offered sheltered water in an ice-free harbor, perfect for seaplane landings, good anchorage on the beach front, accessibility to supplies from Naval Station Norfolk and room for expansion. Its mission was to conduct anti-submarine patrols, train aviators and mechanics and run an experimental facility.

=== Early years ===
When the United States became involved in World War I, the size of the Navy's air component was rapidly expanded. In the 19 months of U. S. participation, a force of 6,716 officers and 30,693 enlisted served in naval aviation. The training of mechanics to support the aircraft began in January 1918 at the Norfolk detachment and the first patrol was conducted five months later. By then, the air detachment was recognized as one of the most important sources of trained naval aviators. In recognition of its importance, on August 27, 1918, the detachment became NAS Hampton Roads, a separate station under its own commanding officer, Lt. Cmdr. Patrick N. L. Bellinger.

As World War I came to an end, the former NAS Hampton Roads saw erratic growth, growing to nearly 167 officers, 1,227 enlisted men and 65 planes. However, demobilization threatened the future of naval aviation. Within seven months of the war's end, Navy manpower fell to less than half its wartime highs.

The Republican party rose to power in 1920, promising fiscal austerity. Congress cut naval appropriations by 20% and manpower Navy-wide was reduced. The carriers which Congress had authorized were impossible to man. After the 1929 stock market crash and the onset of the Great Depression, President Herbert Hoover favored more naval limitation through international conferences, but the air operations in Norfolk continued.

On July 12, 1921, the name was changed again under the command of Capt. S.H.R. Doyle, to NAS Norfolk, with direct reporting to the Bureau of Aeronautics in Washington, D.C.

Using the same theories of Eugene Ely's flight nearly 13 years earlier, another milestone was achieved. The air station developed an arresting device to train pilots for deck landings aboard the fleet's first aircraft carrier, USS Langley. At the same time, the station also began work on the development of the catapult.

In January 1923, the secretary of the Navy ordered a detailed study of the capacity of the bases and stations during war and peace. In comparing the development of the fleet and shore establishments, only Hampton Roads met the requirements.

Airship operations, important for off-shore patrols during the war, ceased in 1924. In an effort similar to base closure struggles the military has today, civilian employees of the Assembly and Repair Department (forerunner of the former Naval Air Depot) joined the Norfolk Chamber of Commerce in successfully fighting the planned suspension of aircraft overhaul work. The training of air groups from newly commissioned aircraft carriers such as USS Langley, USS Saratoga and USS Lexington demanded expansion, but appropriations were meager for shore establishments.

During the late 1930s, major construction took place at NS Norfolk. At this time, building K-BB (Naval Station headquarters), the galley, and many barracks were built. As the 1930s came to a close, the station also began to prepare for total war. By 1939, when the Atlantic Fleet returned to the East Coast, the Naval Station was clearly the biggest naval installation on the Atlantic coast. In April 1939, in something of a test, the Naval Station refueled, restocked, and returned to service 25 ships in one week. This force was but the prelude to about 100 ships converging on Norfolk at the time. It included the battleships California, Idaho and New Mexico and the carriers, Lexington, Ranger, Yorktown and Enterprise.

The expansion of shipboard aviation in the 1930s brought renewed emphasis to Naval Air Station Norfolk. Reverting to its experimental roots, development and testing of catapult and arresting gear systems took the highest priority at the Air Station. The commissioning of the aircraft carriers Ranger, Yorktown, Wasp, and Hornet increased the tempo of routine training in navigation, gunnery and aerial bombing as new air wings formed prior to World War II. This demanded expansion, but appropriations for shore activities were meager. Although congressional approval was gained in 1934 for the purchase of land that would expand the airfield by 540 acres (2.2 km²), the matter was dropped. At the outbreak of war in Europe on September 1, 1939, NAS Norfolk encompassed 236 acres (1.0 km²) with two small operating areas, Chambers Field and West Landing Field. During World War II, the Naval Air Station had a direct combat support role in the area of anti-submarine patrols. President Franklin D. Roosevelt's response to the start of the war in Europe was the National Emergency Program of September 8, 1939. It resulted in fantastic growth for all Navy activities in the Norfolk area. The combat support role began on October 21, 1939, when a 600-mile (970 km)-wide Neutrality Zone was declared around the American coast. Four Norfolk-based patrol squadrons, VP-51, US VP-52, VP-53 and VP-54 were among the first units to enforce the zone.

=== World War II ===
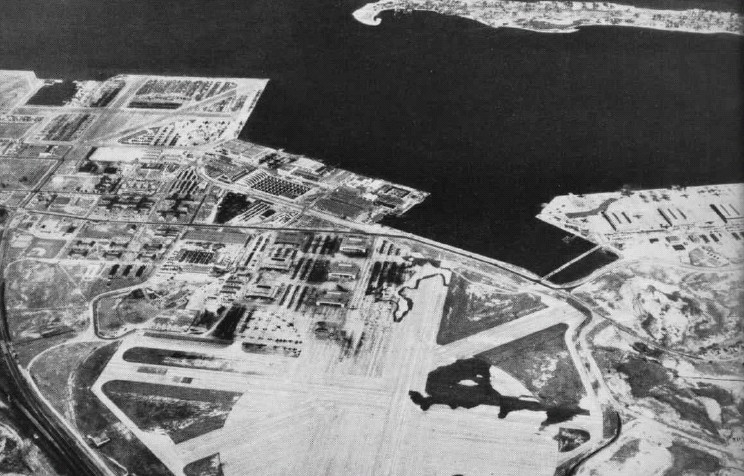
Aerial view of NAS Norfolk in the mid-1940s

==== Wartime Contributions ====
After war was formally declared following Pearl Harbor, Germany began a U-boat offensive, "Operation Drumbeat", against shipping along the Atlantic coast. The Eastern Sea Frontier, a command headquartered in New York, directed the American response. Locally, Fleet Air Wing 5 units flew under its operational command of the 5th Naval District. Wing 5 units involved consisted of scouting squadrons, 12 OS2U Kingfisher seaplanes and VPs 83 and 84 equipped with PBY-5A Catalinas. By 1942, NAS Norfolk was home to 24 fleet units. From January through April 1942, the Eastern Sea Frontier recorded 82 sinkings by U-boats. During the same period, only eight U-boats were sunk by U.S. forces. Eventually, coastal convoys were instituted and more aircraft became available. German U-boats moved elsewhere and sinkings decreased. To move closer to their patrol areas and free up space for the training of new squadrons, NAS Norfolk-based patrol squadrons transferred their operations from Breezy Point to Chincoteague and Elizabeth City.

However, NAS Norfolk's biggest contribution to the winning of World War II was in the training it provided to a wide variety of allied naval air units. With only a few exceptions, all Navy air squadrons that fought in the war trained in Norfolk. The air station also trained numerous British fighter squadrons and French and Russian patrol squadrons. At the start of the war, training activities at NAS did not fall under the direction of a single overseer. This changed on January 1, 1943 with the creation of Commander, Air Force Atlantic Fleet appointment, in which Rear Admiral Alva D. Bernhard was the first incumbent. The former NAS commanding officer was tasked with providing administrative, material and logistic support for Atlantic Fleet aviation units. AIRLANT also furnished combat-ready carrier air groups, patrol squadrons and battleship and cruiser aviation units for both the Atlantic and Pacific fleets.

Following the formation of AIRLANT and the abolishment of recruit training on the surface side in 1942, the base transitioned to an advanced training location for men going directly to the fleet. With the change in the training station and the declaration of war, the mission became that of a pre-commissioning training station. The aviation service A school offered courses in metal smith work, engine repair, radio repair and ordnance. Aviation machinist's mate A school consisted of two months of training and two months of practical experience in A&R department shops. The advanced base aviation training unit helped sailors develop the skills necessary to maintain all types of aircraft at advanced bases in combat area. The aircraft they completed went to the fleet pool for distribution to squadrons in the process of commissioning. A similar service for maintenance crews in squadrons awaiting the commissioning of new carriers was provided by the carrier air service unit. Among the earliest schools at NAS was the fighter director school, which taught fleet communications and tactics, radar operations and direction of aircraft from ships before moving to Georgia. The celestial navigation training unit instructed pilots being assigned to patrol squadrons. The aerial free gunnery training unit was originally located at Breezy Point, but moved to Dam Neck in 1943 to be able to carry out range work without restricting airspace.

From 1943 to the end of the war, a total of 326 U.S. units were commissioned and trained under the control of AIRLANT.

==== Expansion ====
World War II profoundly changed the appearance of the Naval Station. With the eruption of war in Europe in September 1939, the station began to vibrate with activity. By December, the Navy had over $4 million in projects underway on the station. By the summer of 1940 the Station employed some 8,000 personnel, a number larger than any time since the end of World War I. The Hepburn Board had made recommendations to Congress earlier in the year that would also double the size and workload of the station. Since Chambers and West Fields were encroaching on the activities of the former Naval Operating Base, it was decided to expand to the east. East Camp, with an area of about 1,000 acres (4 km²) between the east side of Naval Station and Granby Street, had been sold off by the Army at the end of World War I. Congress authorized its repurchase in early 1940. On June 29 of that year, a contract was signed with the Virginia Engineering Company of Newport News for the expansion of the station. The cost of expansion and construction was to reach more than $72 million. Hangars, a new dispensary, three runways, magazine areas, warehouses, barracks and docking areas were patterned after similar existing airfields. The plan was revised and approved by Captain Bellinger, returning as commanding officer 20 years after first holding the job. Bellinger insisted that as many structures as possible be permanent ones, as the air station was still largely composed of temporary hangars and workshops left over from World War I. Many were unsafe and costly to maintain. The last permanent structure added had been the administration building, constructed in 1930. Some 353 acres (1.4 km²) were eventually reclaimed at a cost of $2.1 million. Two large hangars and ramps for seaplanes, barracks, officer quarters and family housing were built. This construction cut off Mason Creek Road and the Navy compensated the city by improving Kersloe Road (forming what is now Admiral Taussig Boulevard/Interstate 564) between Hampton Boulevard and Granby Street. Special attention was paid to control facilities—prior to the expansion, operations from Chambers Field had no traffic control system except for a white placard inserted through a slot on the roof to indicate the direction of the runway in use.

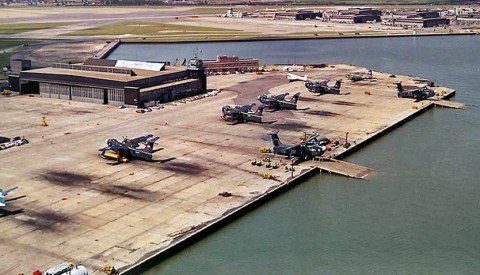
P5M Marlins at NAS Norfolk in the 1950s.

A new command, Naval Air Center, had been formed October 12, 1942 under Captain J.M. Shoemaker, the 15th and 18th commanding officer of NAS Norfolk, to coordinate operations within the Norfolk area. The outlying fields were used for training, patrol plane operations, practice bombing and aerial gunnery. The assembly and repair (A&R) department also offers an excellent example of expansion at the Naval Air Station. In 1939, A&R occupied four World War I hangars and a few workshops. It employed 213 enlisted men and 573 civilians in the overhaul of aircraft engines and fuselages. During the war, the A&R Department went to two 10-hour shifts per day, seven days a week for a work force that now numbered 1,600 enlisted and 3,500 civilians. Women, who had been employed only as seamstress for wing and fuselage fabric, began working in A&R machine shops as labor shortages became acute. During the summer of 1942, the apprentice school was opened to provide training in nine trades. By war's end, assembly and repair had developed into a Class "A" industrial plant with peak employment of 3,561 civilians and 4,852 military workers.

=== Post WWII and Cold War ===
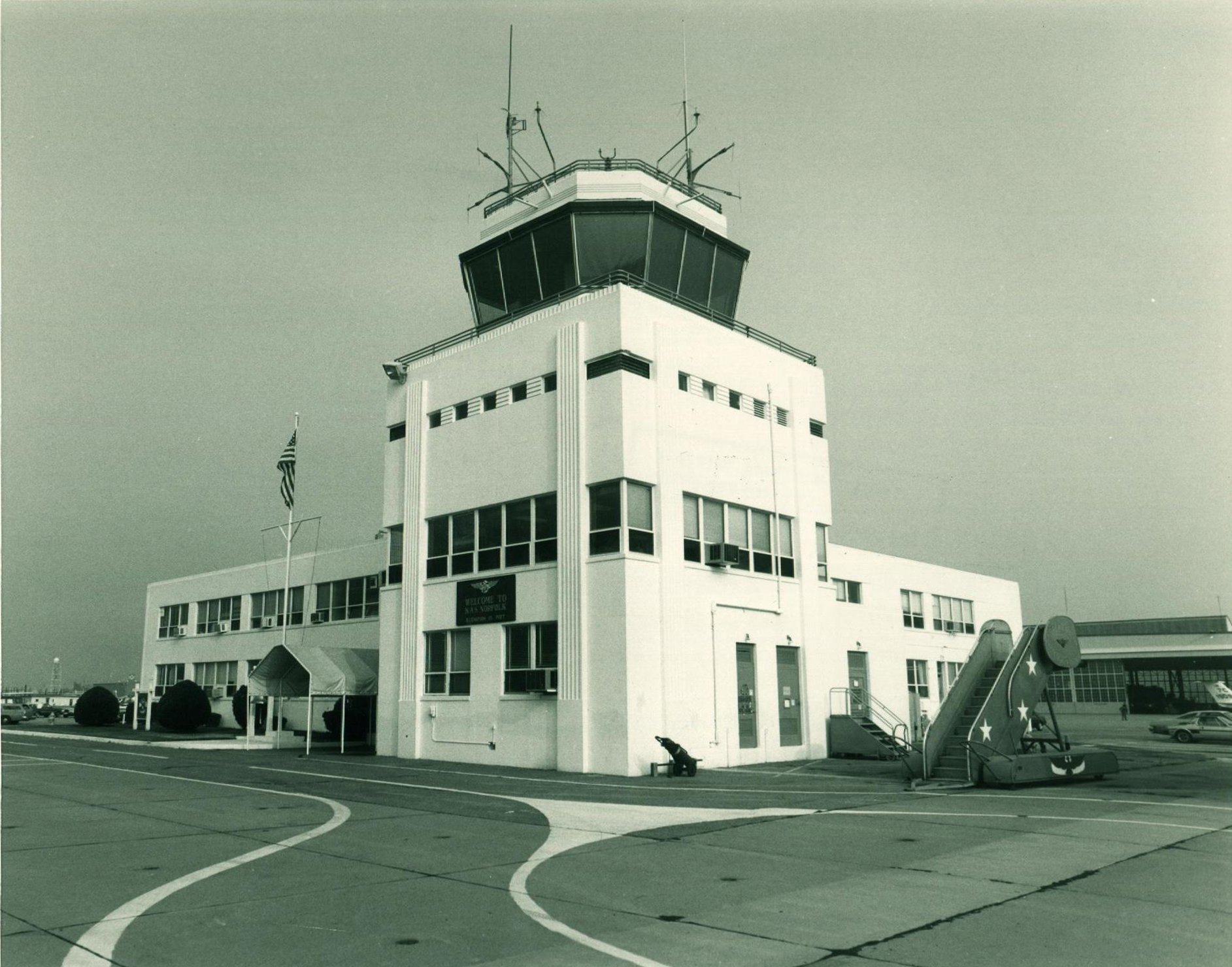
Chambers Field Building LP-1, NAS Norfolk, in 1982, control tower and air traffic control offices. Building was located on the northwest corner of intersecting runways 10/28 and 1/19. Building no longer exists.

The air station has hosted more than 70 tenant commands, including several carrier groups, a carrier airborne early warning wing and associated squadrons, a helicopter sea control wing and associated squadrons, and various Naval Air Reserve units, primarily the wing headquarters for Reserve Patrol Wing Atlantic, the local headquarters for Naval Air Reserve Norfolk and Reserve E-2 Hawkeye, C-9 Skytrain II and various helicopter squadrons. A Marine Corps Reserve medium helicopter squadron with CH-46 Sea Knight aircraft was also assigned. NAS Norfolk also responded to national times of stress, such as Operation Sincere Welcome in 1994, when 2,000 civilian workers, dependents, and non-essential military personnel were evacuated to Norfolk from Guantanamo Bay Naval Base in Cuba. This influx of people was an instance of history repeating itself, as the station also welcomed evacuees during the Cuban Missile Crisis in 1962.

In 1968, the air station was given a major role in John F. Kennedy's vision of putting a man on the moon. The air station became Recovery Control Center (RCC) Atlantic, which provided command, control, and communications for the ships and aircraft that participated in the recovery operations of Apollo 7.

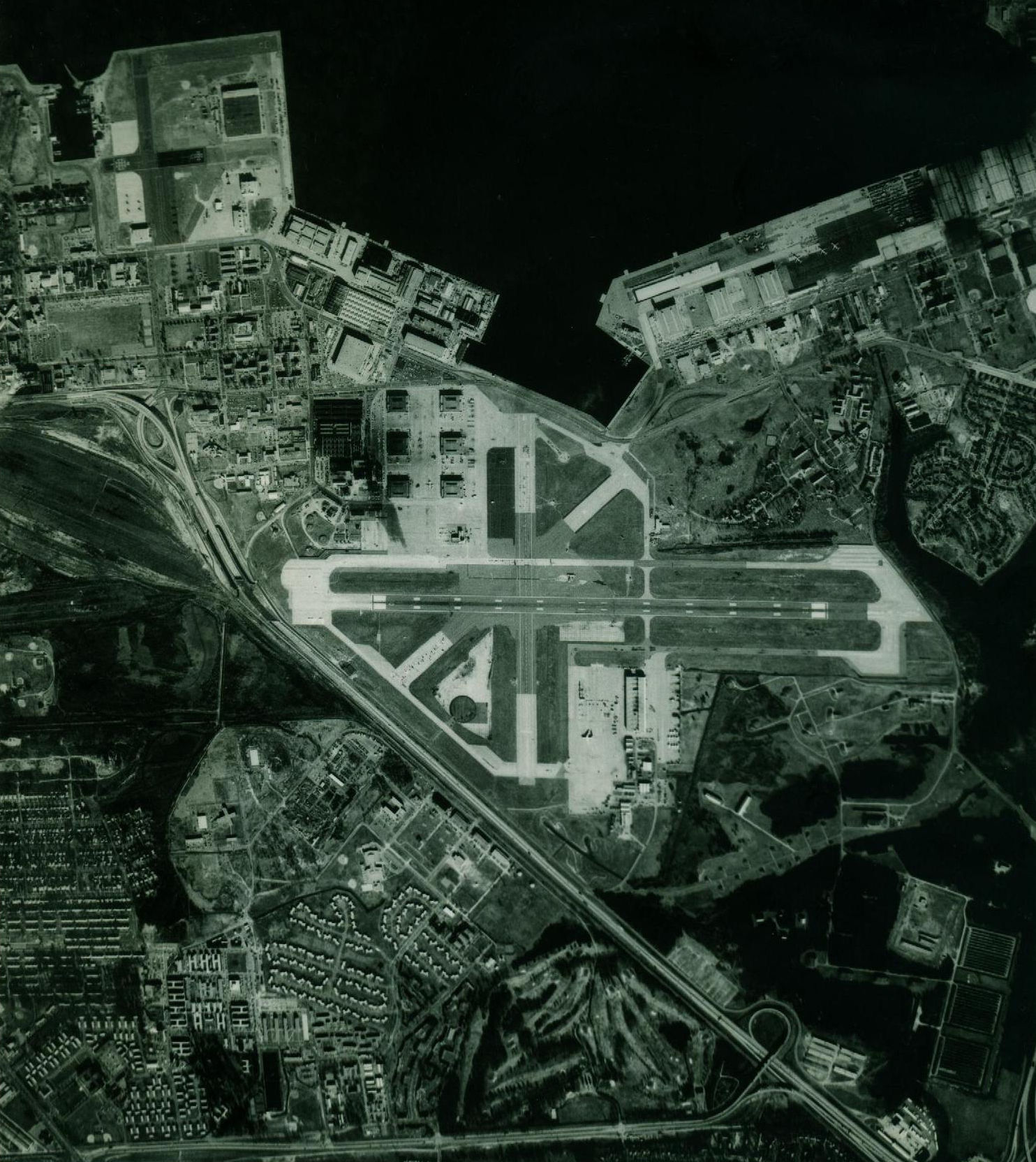
NAS Norfolk Chambers Field in 1982 showing runways 10/28 and 1/19.

=== From the 1990s ===
As part of the Navy's response to the post-Cold War drawdown of the 1990s, many new initiatives were implemented at Navy shore installations to reduce their operating cost, improve their efficiency, and better match their capacity to the reduced size of the Navy. The 1993 Base Realignment and Closure Commission recommended the closure of Naval Aviation Depot Norfolk and its workforce of over 4,000 repairing Grumman F-14 Tomcats and Grumman A-6 Intruders, and a year later the depot shut its doors.

In 1998, the Navy began a major realignment of shore command organizations and processes throughout Hampton Roads in a process known as "regionalization". One of the biggest efficiencies in this process was the merger of separate Naval Station Norfolk and the Naval Air Station (which were directly adjacent to each other) into a single installation to be called Naval Station Norfolk. The former naval air station organizational structure became the Air Department of NS Norfolk while the actual airfield became known as NS Norfolk (Chambers Field). This consolidation became official on February 5, 1999. In 2012, the merger was fully consummated as NAS Oceana Detachment Norfolk personnel (the placeholder command for the ex-Naval Air Station) was disestablished and folded into Naval Station Norfolk's Air Operations Department.

== Tenant Commands ==
=== Shore Units ===
- Navy/AMC Passenger Terminal
- Commander, Naval Air Forces, Atlantic
- Helicopter Sea Combat Wing Atlantic
  - Helicopter Sea Combat Weapons School Atlantic
- Fleet Weather Center Norfolk
- Navy Information Operations Command Norfolk
- CNATTU Norfolk

=== Operational/Fleet Units ===
Insignia	Squadron	Code	Callsign/Nickname	Assigned Aircraft	Operational Assignment
	Carrier Airborne Early Warning Squadron 120	VAW-120	Greyhawks	E-2 Hawkeye	Fleet Replacement Squadron (FRS)
	Carrier Airborne Early Warning Squadron 121	VAW-121	Bluetails	E-2 Hawkeye	Carrier Air Wing Seven
	Carrier Airborne Early Warning Squadron 123	VAW-123	Screwtops	E-2 Hawkeye	Carrier Air Wing Three
	Carrier Airborne Early Warning Squadron 124	VAW-124	Bear Aces	E-2 Hawkeye	Carrier Air Wing Eight
	Carrier Airborne Early Warning Squadron 126	VAW-126	Seahawks	E-2 Hawkeye	Carrier Air Wing One
	Fleet Logistics Support Squadron 40	VRC-40	Rawhides	C-2 Greyhound	Provides detachments of two aircraft to each East Coast Carrier Air Wing
	Fleet Logistics Multi-Mission Squadron 40	VRM-40	Mighty Bison	CMV-22B Osprey	Provides logistical support to the fleet
	Helicopter Mine Countermeasures Squadron 12	HM-12	Sea Dragons	MH-53E Sea Dragon	Fleet Replacement Squadron
	Helicopter Mine Countermeasures Squadron 15	HM-15	Blackhawks	MH-53E Sea Dragon	Forward/Expeditionary Deployments
	Helicopter Sea Combat Squadron 2	HSC-2	"Fleet Angels"	MH-53E Sea Dragon	Fleet Replacement Squadron
	Helicopter Sea Combat Squadron 5	HSC-5	Nightdippers	MH-60S Knighthawk	Carrier Air Wing Seven
	Helicopter Sea Combat Squadron 7	HSC-7	Dusty Dogs	MH-60S Knighthawk	Carrier Air Wing Three
	Helicopter Sea Combat Squadron 9	HSC-9	Tridents	MH-60S Knighthawk	Carrier Air Wing Eight
	Helicopter Sea Combat Squadron 11	HSC-11	Dragon Slayers	MH-60S Knighthawk	Carrier Air Wing One
	Helicopter Sea Combat Squadron 22	HSC-22	Sea Knights	MH-60S Knighthawk	Amphibious Ready Group Deployments
	Helicopter Sea Combat Squadron 26	HSC-26	Chargers	MH-60S Knighthawk	Forward/Expeditionary and Amphibious Ready Group Deployments
	Helicopter Sea Combat Squadron 28	HSC-28	Dragon Whales	MH-60S Knighthawk	Amphibious Ready Group Deployments

== See also ==
- List of United States Navy airfields
