= Howard E. Greer =

- Born: May 1, 1921; Tyler, Texas, U.S.
- Died: November 22, 2015 (aged 94); Coral Gables, Florida, U.S.
- Military career
- Allegiance: United States
- Branch: United States Navy
- Service years: 1943–1978
- Rank: Vice admiral
- Conflicts: World War II

Howard Earl Greer (May 1, 1921 – November 22, 2015) was a vice admiral in the United States Navy.

He held a Master's Degree in Business Administration from George Washington University, and graduated from the United States Naval Academy in 1943, from the Naval War Command and Staff School in 1954, and from the Industrial College of the Armed Forces in 1961.

His Naval career started in 1943 aboard the USS Princeton from the campaigns at Tarawa until the first attack on the Philippines. He then entered flight training and was designated a Naval Aviator in November, 1945. He served aboard the USS Leyte from 1946-1947. He then served aboard USS Coral Sea from 1951-1952. He served with Fighter Squadrons Seventy-One, Sixty-Two, One Hundred One, and Attack Squadron Two Hundred Fourteen. Aboard USS Midway he commanded Fighter Squadron Sixy-Four from 1957-1958. From 1961-1962 he was commander of Attack Air Group Ten aboard the USS Shangri-La.

After this time he also served:

- As aide to the Deputy Chief of Naval Operations (Air)
- On the staff of the Chief of Naval Operations
- As Commander Fleet Air Jacksonville
- As Commander Sixth Fleet
- As Commander Naval Air Force Atlantic
- As Commander Carrier Division Seven
- As Commander Seventh Fleet

He was the commanding officer aboard the USS Ponchatoula and went on to be the 21st commander of the USS Hancock (CV-19), chief of staff of Naval Air Force Pacific, commander Naval Air Reserve Force, and Commander, Naval Air Force U.S. Atlantic Fleet. His awards include 2 Distinguished Service Medals, 4 Legions of Merit, the Navy Commendation Medal, Pacific Theater WW II Ribbon with 9 Battle Stars and the Vietnamese Distinguished Service Award. He died in 2015.
