= VFA-143 =

Strike Fighter Squadron 143
- Active: 20 July 1950 - present
- Country: United States
- Branch: United States Navy
- Type: Fighter/Attack
- Role: Close air support Air interdiction Aerial reconnaissance
- Part of: Carrier Air Wing One
- Garrison/HQ: NAS Oceana
- Nickname: "Pukin' Dogs"
- Motto: Sans Reproache
- Engagements: Korean War; Vietnam War; Multinational Force in Lebanon; Gulf War; Operation Southern Watch; Operation Deny Flight; Operation Decisive Endeavour; Operation Enduring Freedom; Operation Iraqi Freedom; Anti-piracy measures in Somalia; Operation Inherent Resolve; Operation Prosperity Guardian; Operation Poseidon Archer
- Decorations: FFARP trophy Tactical Reconnaissance trophy Battle Effectiveness "E", 1990; Battle Effectiveness "E", 1996; Battle Effectiveness "E", 2004; Battle Effectiveness "E", 2010; Battle Effectiveness "E", 2013; Battle Effectiveness "E", 2016 Battle Effectiveness "E", 2019; Joseph C. Clifton Award Wade McClusky Award, 2010, 2019

Commanders
- Commanding Officer: CDR Andy Talbott
- Executive Officer: CDR Ty Younts
- Command Master Chief: CMDCM. Matthew L. Wilson

Aircraft flown
- Fighter: F4U Corsair; F9F Panther; F3H Demon; F-4 Phantom II; F-14 Tomcat; F/A-18E Super Hornet

Strike Fighter Squadron 143 (VFA-143), also known as the "Pukin Dogs," is a United States Navy strike fighter squadron based at Naval Air Station Oceana, Virginia. The Pukin Dogs are an operational fleet squadron and flying the F/A-18E Super Hornet. They are currently attached to Carrier Air Wing One and USS Harry S Truman. They are currently at their homeport of NAS Oceana. Their radio callsign is Taproom.

The unit's patch can be seen worn by Danny Ramirez in Top Gun: Maverick.

== Insignia and nickname ==
The squadron adopted its current insignia in 1953, a winged black griffon on a blue shield. The distinctive squadron name "Pukin' Dogs" came about when the squadron commander's wife saw the creature’s droopy head and gaping mouth design. She stated, in front of the squadron pilots, that it looked like a "pukin' dog." The pilots loved that, and the name stuck. In the aftermath of the Tailhook scandal in 1991, the squadron was forced to officially rename itself the "Dogs". This official banishment was widely ignored until Admiral John Mazach, Commander, Naval Air Force U.S. Atlantic Fleet, rescinded the policy in a 1996 speech to the squadron.

== History ==
Two Navy squadrons have held the designation VF-143. The first VF-143 was established on 20 July 1950 as VF-821 redesignated VF-143 on 4 February 1953 and disestablished on 1 April 1958. The second VF-143 was established in 1950, was eventually redesignated VFA-143, and is the subject of this article.

=== 1950s ===
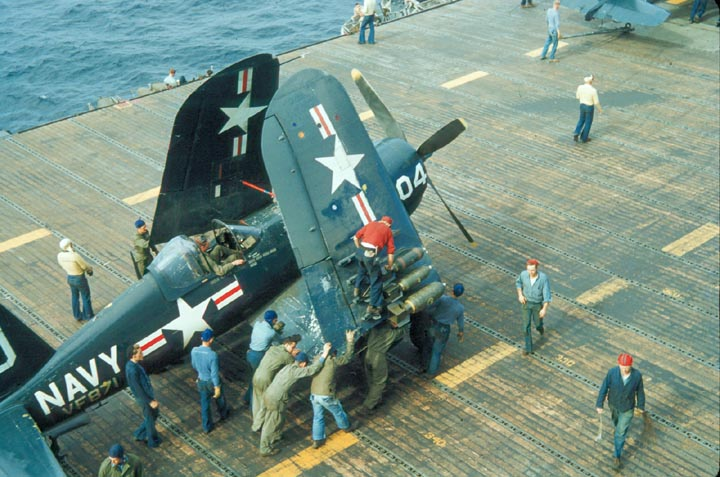
VF-871 F4U-4 aboard USS Essex in 1952

VF-871, a reserve F4U-4 Corsair squadron based at NAS Alameda called to active duty on 20 July 1950. The squadron deployed twice during the Korean War, flying from the aircraft carriers USS Princeton from 31 May to 25 August 1951 and USS Essex from 16 June 1952 to 6 February 1953. On 4 February 1953, the squadron was redesignated VF-123 and transitioned to the F9F-2 Panther. In April 1958 they transitioned to the F3H Demon and were redesignated VF-53.

=== 1960s ===
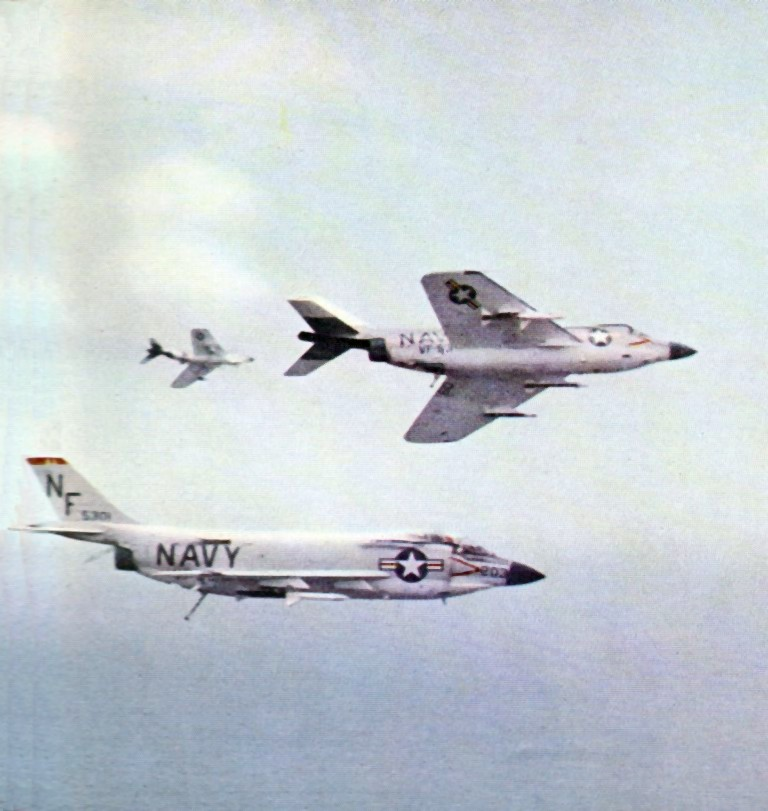
VF-53 F3H-2s in 1961

On 20 June 1962, the unit was redesignated VF-143 and began its transition to the F-4 Phantom II. They deployed seven times during the Vietnam War.

The squadron deployed on USS Constellation from 5 May 1964 to 1 February 1965. The squadron deployed on USS Ranger from 10 December 1965 to 25 August 1966. The squadron deployed on USS Constellation again from 27 April to 4 December 1967. On 26 October LTJG R. Hickey and LTJG J. Morris shot down a MiG-21. The squadron deployed on USS Constellation again from 29 May 1968 to 31 January 1969. The squadron deployed on USS Constellation again from 11 August 1969 to 8 May 1970.

=== 1970s ===
The squadron deployed on USS Enterprise from 11 June 1971 to 12 February 1972.

VF-143's last Vietnam deployment began on 12 September 1972 onboard USS Enterprise. On 27 January 1973, the last day of official hostilities before the Paris Peace Accords took effect across Vietnam, a squadron Phantom was struck by antiaircraft fire over Quảng Trị Province while performing one of the last combat missions of the war in support of the Battle of Cửa Việt. The squadron's executive officer, Commander Harley Hall, and his radar intercept officer (RIO) ejected near the coast and both were seen alive on the ground by their wingman. The RIO was captured by North Vietnamese and returned from captivity a few months later. Hall became the last Naval Aviator listed as missing in action (MIA). Two weeks after the shoot down, however, his status was changed from MIA to "prisoner of war (POW), authenticated", a designation held until he was declared deceased in February 1980. His remains were identified on 6 September 1994.

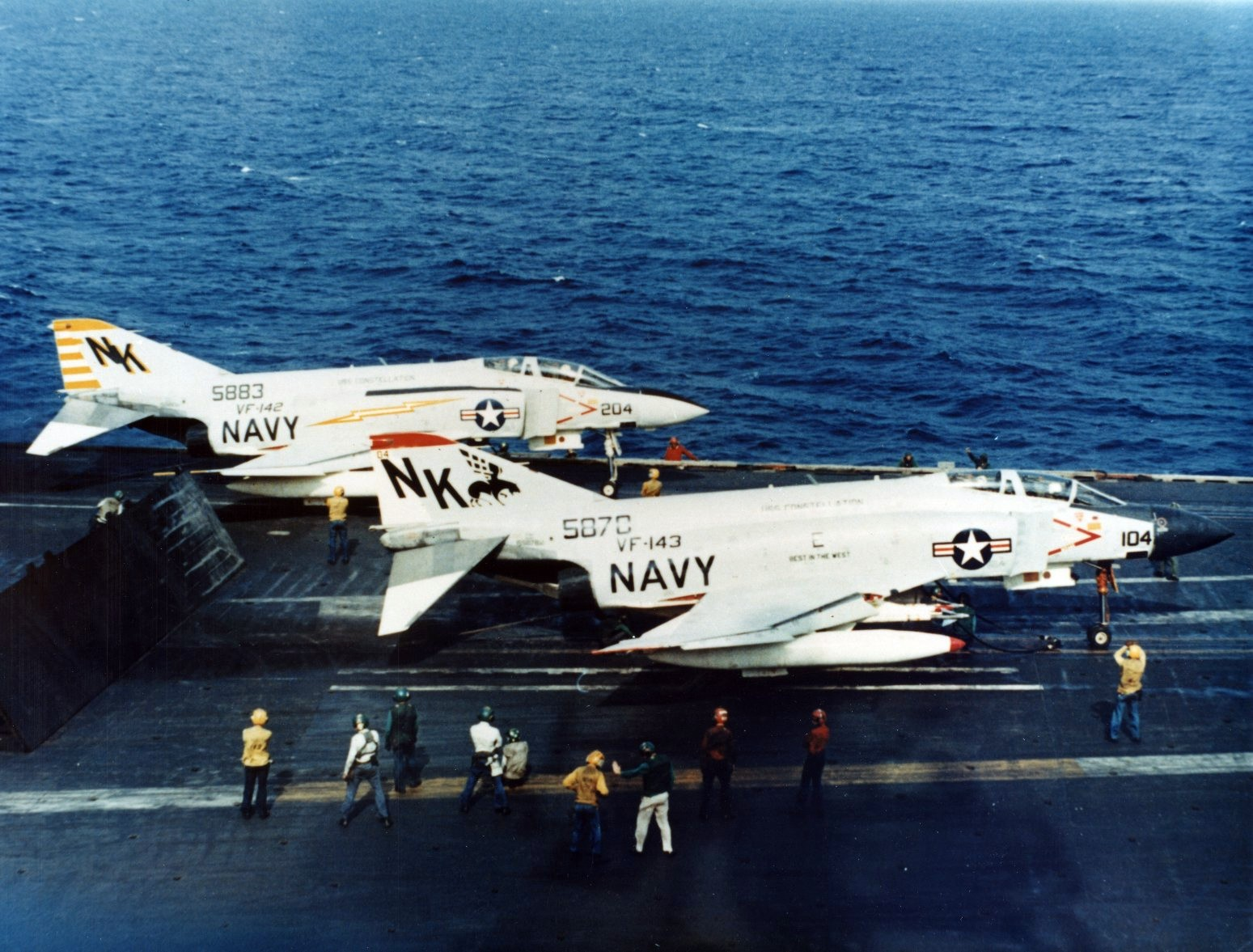
VF-143 and VF-142 F-4Js on USS Constellation, 1969/70

The squadron returned to NAS Miramar on 12 June 1973, and three months later made a final Phantom deployment to the Mediterranean. In 1974, VF-143 transitioned to the F-14 Tomcat and then changed homeport to NAS Oceana in 1976. VF-143 and its sister squadron VF-142 were aboard USS America for her maiden voyage in 1976.

=== 1980s ===
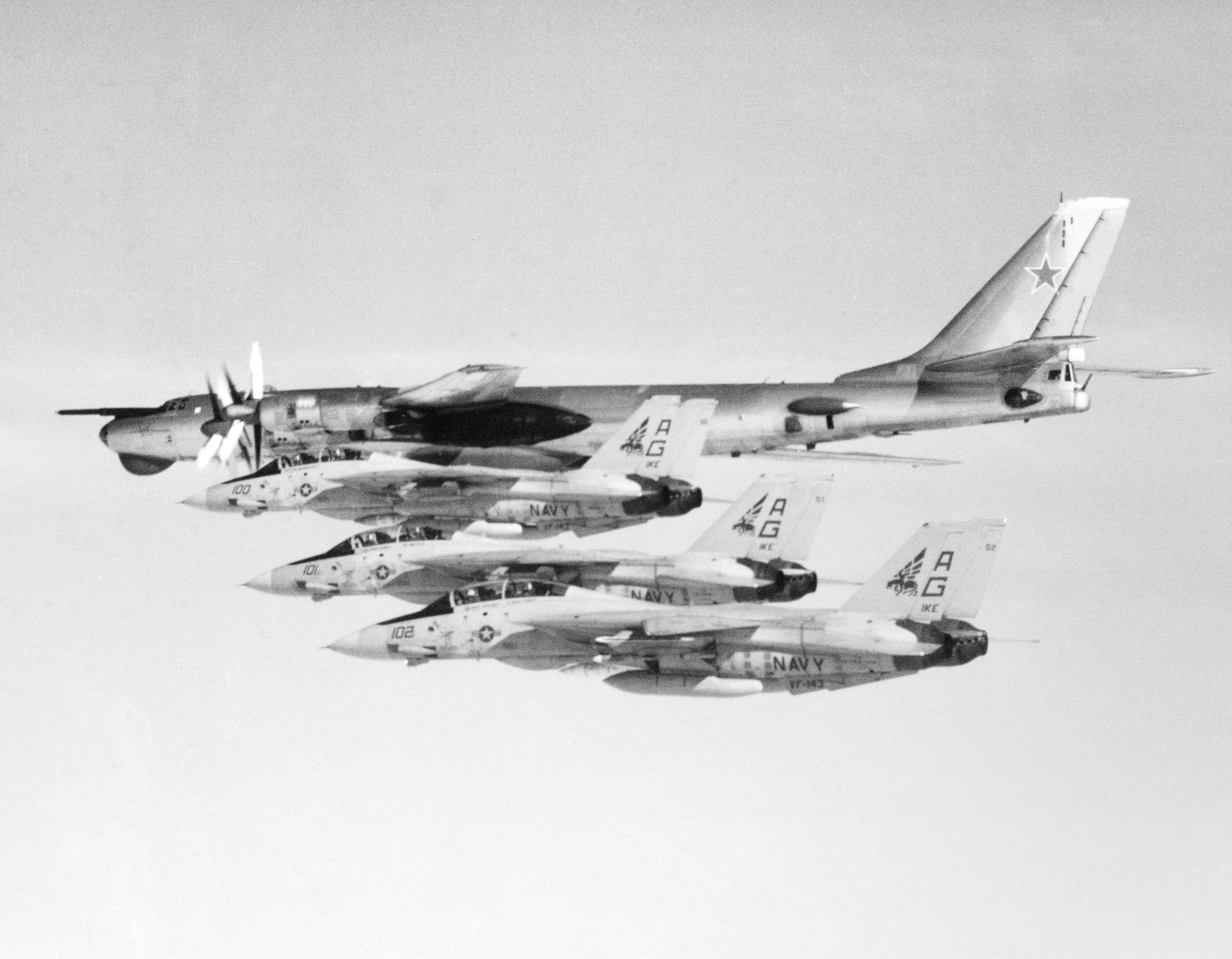
Three VF-143 F-14As intercept a Tu-95 in 1982

In 1980 VF-143 deployed to the Indian Ocean in response to the Iran–Iraq War, setting a Navy underway record of 153 days. VF-143 soon gained Tactical Air Reconnaissance Pod System (TARPS) capability, and provided the first time imagery of the new Soviet aircraft carrier Novorossiysk and the new Soviet Slava-class cruiser. On 5 August 1983, VF-143 intercepted five Libyan Air Force MiG-23s some 220 kilometers (140 mi) south of USS Dwight D. Eisenhower in the Mediterranean Sea. No weapons were fired during these encounters but the situation was described as "very tense". The squadron became the first to fly combat TARPS missions when they flew 45 combat reconnaissance sorties over Lebanon in the autumn of 1983.

=== 1990s ===
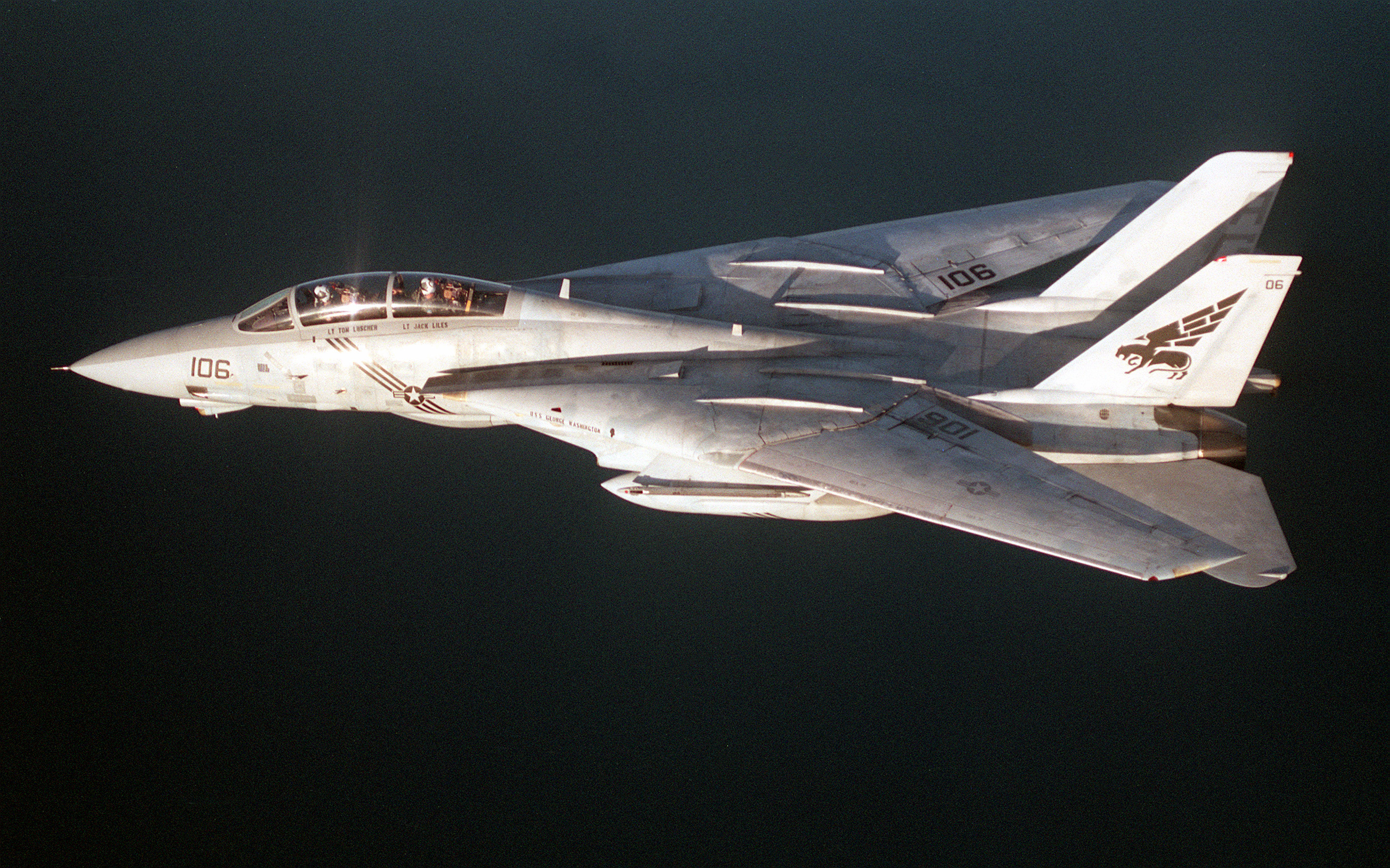
VF-143 F-14B Tomcat

VF-143 was one of the first squadrons to deploy with the F-14A(+) (later renamed F-14B), in March 1990 aboard USS Dwight D. Eisenhower. When Iraq invaded Kuwait in August 1990, USS Dwight D. Eisenhower and her battle group rushed to the Red Sea to deter the Iraqis from further advancement into Saudi Arabia. In late August, USS Saratoga relieved USS Dwight D. Eisenhower .

In early 1991, VF-143 was awarded COMNAVAIRLANT's 1990 Battle Efficiency Award as the Atlantic Fleet's finest fighter squadron. In addition, VF-143 was awarded the Chief of Naval Operations Rear Admiral Joseph C. Clifton Award. In May 1991 during the Air Wing's detachment to NAS Fallon, VF-143 dropped air-to-ground ordnance for the first time. In September, the squadron deployed to the Persian Gulf, and participated NATO exercises in the Norwegian Sea.

In August 1992, the squadron and the rest of Carrier Air Wing Seven switched aircraft carriers to USS George Washington, the Navy’s newest aircraft carrier. VF-143 deployed for USS George Washington's maiden cruise and then again for the carrier’s first Mediterranean Sea deployment in May 1994 where she took part in the 50th anniversary commemoration of the D-Day invasion and Operation Deny Flight. VF-143 returned to NAS Oceana in December 1994. VF-143 was awarded the 1994 Battle E, Safety S, Joseph C. Clifton and Golden Wrench awards.

In January 1996, VF-143 departed on their second deployment in thirteen months, operating in support of Operation Decisive Endeavour and Operation Southern Watch. The squadron provided TARPS, Forward Air Controller, air superiority and air-to-ground missions. VF-143 returned to Oceana in July 1996.

In early 1997, VF-143 transitioned to the Navy's newest carrier, USS John C. Stennis, deploying in 1998. The maiden deployment took them to the Persian Gulf, spending 131 days there in support of Operation Southern Watch. VF-143 played key roles using LANTIRN, night vision goggles and digital TARPS. VF-143 was recognized by COMNAVAIRLANT with the 1998 Battle "E" Safety "S" awards.

=== 2000s ===
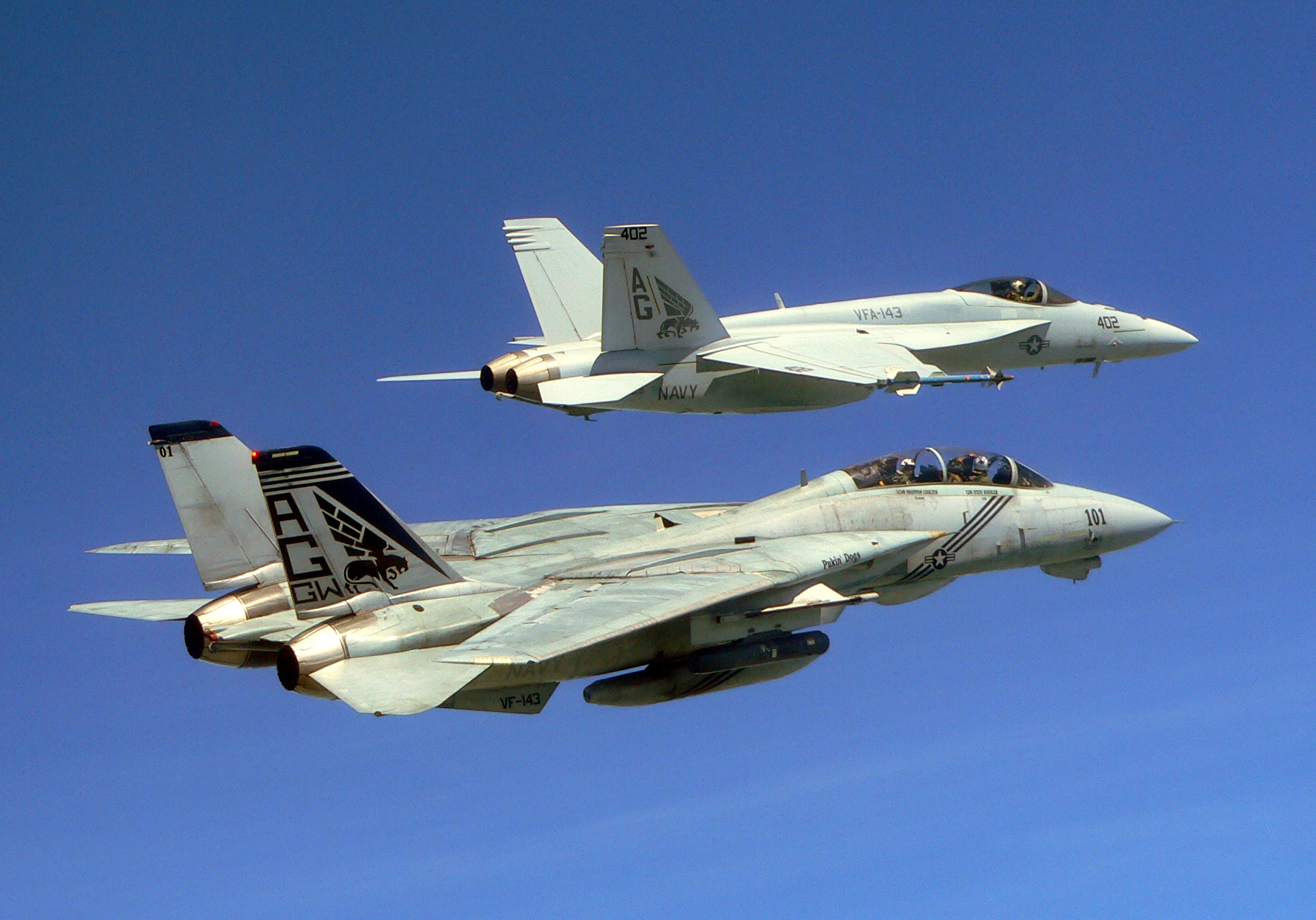
Transition from the F-14B to the F/A-18E

VF-143 deployed in support of Operation Southern Watch, Operation Enduring Freedom and Operation Iraqi Freedom. The last deployment with the F-14 was in 2004 aboard USS George Washington in support of Operation Iraqi Freedom, during which time the squadron participated in strikes over Fallujah between 28 April – 29 April.

In 2005 VF-143 transitioned to the F/A-18E Super Hornet, and was designated Strike Fighter Squadron 143 (VFA-143).

The first deployment with the F/A-18E commenced in 2006 and ended in the spring of 2007. During the cruise aboard USS Dwight D. Eisenhower, VFA-143 supported Operations Iraqi Freedom, Enduring Freedom and operations off the Somali coast.

On 21 February 2009 VFA-143 and CVW-7 embarked aboard USS Dwight D. Eisenhower for a deployment supporting Operation Enduring Freedom and maritime security operations in the Persian Gulf. On 30 July 2009, USS Dwight D. Eisenhower returned to Naval Station Norfolk after almost a six-month deployment.

=== 2010s ===
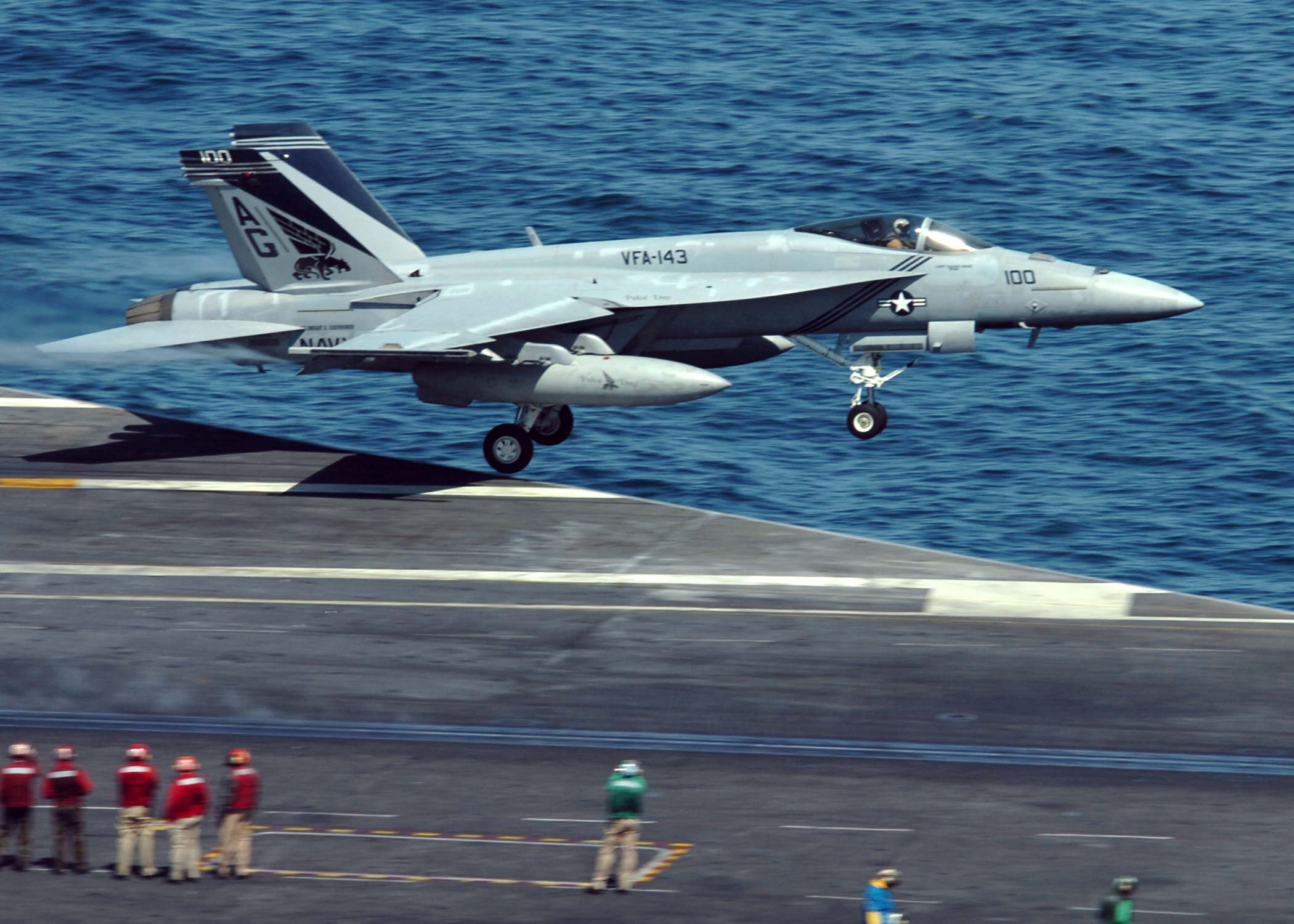
VFA-143 F/A-18E Super Hornet takes off from USS Dwight D. Eisenhower

VFA-143 and the rest of CVW-7 embarked on board USS Dwight D. Eisenhower on 2 January 2010 for a seven-month deployment in support of 5th and 6th Fleet operations. The "Pukin' Dogs" won the 2010 Wade McClusky Award, as most outstanding attack squadron in the US Navy, for its performance during this deployment. In June 2012, VFA-143 deployed again on board Dwight D. Eisenhower for a nine-month deployment in support of Operation Enduring Freedom. That deployment was cut short due to the requirement for entire Carrier Strike Group to surge. Dwight D. Eisenhower returned to Naval Station Norfolk just prior Christmas in December 2012. The Air Wing re-embarked on Dwight D. Eisenhower and got underway in February 2013 for a five-month surge deployment, again in support of Operation Enduring Freedom.

After a two-year maintenance period, the "Pukin' Dogs" and the rest of CVW-7 embarked on board USS Harry S. Truman on 15 November 2015 for a seven-month deployment in support of Operation Inherent Resolve. CVW-7 dropped a record breaking number and tonnage of ordnance on targets in the vicinity of Fallujah, Ramadi, and Mosul Iraq. As well as support coalition forces in western Syria. VFA-143 dropped 422 precision guided weapons, totaling nearly 400,000 pounds of ordnance. After being extended for a month, VFA-143 returned to NAS Oceana Virginia on 12 July 2016.

=== 2020s ===
After 45 years with CVW-7, the squadron was transferred to Carrier Air Wing One as of October 2023.

In late September 2024, VFA-143 and their F/A-18Es departed the US as part of CVW-1 on a scheduled deployment aboard the USS Harry S. Truman

Following multiple exercises with European militaries, VFA-143 and CVW-1 were ordered to operate in the Red Sea in defense of international shipping lanes and Israel against Houthi/Iran proxy military unit attacks from Yemen. VFA-143 and CVW-1 arrived in the CENTCOM AOR in mid December 2024 with combat operations against the Houthis/Iranians commencing upon arrival to the Red Sea.

Airstrikes were undertaken against the Houthis/Iranians for much of the later half of December 2024 through April 2025. Strikes against the Houthis/Iranian proxy military units in Yemen increased significantly following March 15, 2025, with VFA-143 and CVW-1 conducting increased sorties on a larger set of enemy targets.

== See also ==
- Naval aviation
- Modern US Navy carrier air operations
- List of United States Navy aircraft squadrons
- List of Inactive United States Navy aircraft squadrons
