= Naval Air Force Atlantic =

Type Command for U.S. Naval air forces operating primarily in the Atlantic

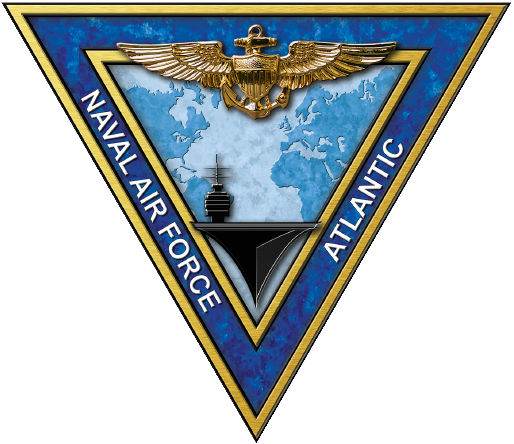
AirLant Logo

The Commander, Naval Air Force Atlantic (also known as COMNAVAIRLANT, AIRLANT, and CNAL) is the aviation type commander (TYCOM) for the United States Naval aviation units operating primarily in the Atlantic under United States Fleet Forces Command. Type Commanders are in administrative control (ADCON), and in some cases operational control (OPCON) of certain types of assets (ships, submarines, aircraft, and fleet marines) assigned to the Pacific and Atlantic Fleets. AIRLANT is responsible for the material readiness, administration, training, and inspection of units/squadrons under their command, and for providing operationally ready air squadrons and aircraft carriers to the fleet.

COMNAVAIRLANT is headquartered at Naval Support Activity, Hampton Roads. The staff is made up of approximately 650 officer, enlisted, civilian and contractor personnel.

== Mission ==
"Support COMLANTFLT and other commanders by providing combat ready/sustainable naval air forces, trained and equipped in an environment which emphasizes safety, interoperability and efficient resource management."

== History ==
Naval Air Force, US Atlantic Fleet was established on 1 January 1943, at NAS Norfolk, Virginia. The command was initially called Air Force, Atlantic Fleet and replaced three older organizations: Commander Carriers, Atlantic Fleet; Carrier Replacement Squadron, Atlantic Fleet; and Fleet Air Wings, Atlantic. AIRLANT's mission was to oversee logistics, maintenance and training of east coast aviation units, and to direct all World War II Atlantic operations not assigned to specific task forces. The combat mission consisted primarily of combating German U-boats, which were wreaking havoc on U.S. shipping support for the war effort in Europe. AIRLANT also contributed heavily to war in the Pacific by training Pacific Fleet units and deploying east coast units to the Pacific. In 1944 AIRLANT deployed 16 carriers, 20 carrier air groups, 67 carrier-based squadrons, 21 patrol squadrons and 18 aviation units to the Pacific. On 30 July 1957, the command added "Naval" to its title.

An important subordinate command for a long period was Commander, Fleet Air Keflavik, at what was Naval Air Station Keflavik, Iceland. Naval aviation has always played a large role in the operations at Keflavik, especially with regard to the enormous build-up of the Soviet Navy. Deployment of patrol squadron detachments, and later entire squadrons, started as early as 1951, with the P-2 "Neptune" maritime patrol aircraft succeeded by the Lockheed P-3 "Orion" in the mid-1960s. In 1955, Barrier Force, Atlantic had been established in Argentia, Newfoundland, flying radar early-warning missions using the WV-2 (EC-121 Warning Star aircraft in the North Atlantic from 1957. These aircraft made frequent deployments to Keflavik. On July 1, 1961, Commander Barrier Force, Atlantic moved from Argentia to Keflavik. The duties of Commander, Iceland Defense Force were assumed by the rear admiral commanding Barrier Force Atlantic.

In October 2001, the Chief of Naval Operations placed Type Commanders in a "Lead-Follow" arrangement. Under this arrangement, COMNAVAIRPAC (AIRLANT's west coast counterpart) became TYCOM for all Naval Aviation, and assumed the additional title of Commander, Naval Air Forces (COMNAVAIRFOR). At that time, command of AIRLANT went from a 3-star/Vice Admiral to a 2-star Rear Admiral.

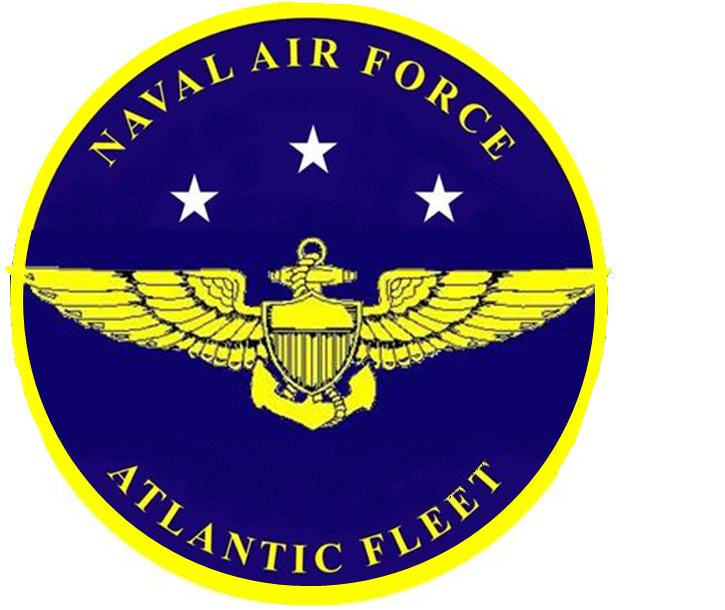
AirLant logo from 1943 to 2001

== List of commanders ==
Dates	Commander
1943	RADM Alva D. Bernhard
1943–1946	VADM Patrick N. L. Bellinger
1946–1948	VADM Gerald F. Bogan
1948–1951	VADM Felix B. Stump
1951–1954	VADM John J. Ballentine
1954–1956	VADM Frederick W. McMahon
1956–1960	VADM William L. Rees
1960–1963	VADM Frank O'Beirne
1963–1965	VADM Paul H. Ramsey
1965–1969	VADM Charles T. Booth
1969–1972	VADM Robert L. Townsend
1972–1975	VADM Frederick H. Michaelis
1975–1978	VADM Howard E. Greer
1978–1981	VADM George E.R. Kinnear II
1981–1983	VADM Thomas J. Kilcline
1983–1983	VADM Carol C. Smith, Jr.
1983–1986	VADM Robert F. Dunn
1986–1989	VADM Richard M. Dunleavy
1989–1991	VADM John K. Ready
1991–1994	VADM Anthony A. Less
1994–1996	VADM Richard C. Allen
1996–1998	VADM John J. Mazach
1998–2001	VADM Joseph S. Mobley
2001–2002	RADM Michael D. Malone
2002–2004	RADM James M. Zortman
2004–2006	RADM H. Denby Starling II
2006–2008	RADM John W. Goodwin
2009–2010	RADM Richard J. O'Hanlon
2010–2013	RADM Ted N. Branch
2013–2015	RADM Troy M. Shoemaker
2015–2016	RADM John R. Haley
2016–2017	RADM Bruce H. Lindsey
2017–2020	RADM Roy J. Kelley
2020–2023	RADM John F. Meier
2023–present	RADM Douglas C. Verissimo

== Subordinate Commands ==
Naval Air Force, U.S. Atlantic Fleet is composed of more than 40,000 men and women who maintain and operate the aircraft carriers, aircraft squadrons and aircraft of the Atlantic Fleet. It provides combat-ready air forces to fleet commanders operating around the globe.

=== Carrier Strike Groups ===
There are six Carrier Strike Group commanders who, although not under operational control of COMNAVAIRLANT, work very closely with the staff. CSG commanders are operationally responsible for the carrier, the embarked airwing and the cruisers that make up the battle group.

- Carrier Strike Group Two (George H.W. Bush Battle Group)
- Carrier Strike Group Eight (Eisenhower Battle Group)
- Carrier Strike Group Ten (Truman Battle Group)
- Carrier Strike Group Twelve (Theodore Roosevelt Battle Group)

=== Aircraft Carriers ===
The nucleus of the surface battle group is the aircraft carrier. In the Atlantic Fleet, COMNAVAIRLANT has five carriers assigned to carry out the mission of COMLANTFLT and other commanders. One or two of these carriers are usually deployed with the U.S. Sixth Fleet in the Mediterranean Sea or with the U.S. Fifth Fleet in the Persian Gulf in support of U.S. Central Command. When not deployed or undergoing periodic maintenance/overhaul, or refresher training, these ships operate with United States Fleet Forces Command Task Force 80 in the Western Atlantic or U.S. Fourth Fleet in the Caribbean.

- USS Dwight D. Eisenhower (CVN-69)
- USS George Washington (CVN-73)
- USS Harry S. Truman (CVN-75)
- USS George H.W. Bush (CVN-77)

=== Carrier air wings ===
The carrier air wing commander is responsible for a number of squadrons whose missions include attack, fighter, patrol, reconnaissance, anti-submarine warfare, electronic warfare and logistic support.

- Carrier Air Wing One
- Carrier Air Wing Three
- Carrier Air Wing Seven
- Carrier Air Wing Eight

=== Type Wings ===
Type Wing commanders are individually responsible for major categories of aircraft squadrons. There are four single Navy wide Type Wing commanders for the Airborne Command & Control and Logistics (E-2C, D and C-2A), Electronic Attack (EA-18G), Joint Strike Fighter (F-35C) and Fleet Logistics Multi-Mission (CMV-22B) communities which report to Commander, Naval Air Forces who is dual hatted as Commander, Naval Air Forces U.S. Pacific Fleet.

==== Commander, Strike Fighter Wing Atlantic Fleet (COMSTRKFIGHTWINGLANT) ====
- VFA-11 Red Rippers
- VFA-31 Tomcatters
- VFA-32 Swordsmen
- VFA-34 Blue Blasters
- VFA-37 Bulls
- VFA-81 Sunliners
- VFA-83 Rampagers
- VFA-87 Golden Warriors
- VFA-103 Jolly Rogers
- VFA-105 Gunslingers
- VFA-106 Gladiators (FRS)
- VFA-131 Wildcats
- VFA-143 Pukin' Dogs
- VFA-211 Fighting Checkmates
- VFA-213 Black Lions
- Strike Fighter Weapons School, Atlantic (STRKFIGHTWPNSCOLANT)
- COMSTRKFITWINGLANT Det Aviation Intermediate Maintenance Department (AIMD) Key West
- COMSTRKFITWINGLANT Det AIMD Oceana

==== Commander, Helicopter Maritime Strike Wing, Atlantic Fleet (COMHSMWINGLANT) ====
- HSM-40 Airwolves (FRS)
- HSM-46 Grandmasters
- HSM-48 Vipers (Expeditionary)
- HSM-50 Valkyries (Expeditionary)
- HSM-70 Spartans
- HSM-72 Proud Warriors
- HSM-74 Swamp Foxes
- HSM-79 Griffins (Expeditionary) (Naval Station Rota, Spain)
- Helicopter Maritime Strike Weapons School, Atlantic (HELMARSTRIKEWEPSCOLANT)
- Naval Surface Rescue Swimmer School, NAS Jacksonville, FL
- Aircraft Carrier Tactical Support Center (CV-TSC), NAS Jacksonville, FL
- Aviation Support Detachment (ASD) Mayport, FL

==== Commander, Helicopter Sea Combat Wing, Atlantic Fleet (COMHELSEACOMBATWINGLANT) ====
- HM-12 Sea Dragons (FRS)
- HM-15 Blackhawks (Expeditionary)
- HSC-2 Fleet Angels (FRS)
- HSC-5 Nightdippers
- HSC-7 Dusty Dogs
- HSC-9 Tridents
- HSC-11 Dragonslayers
- HSC-22 Sea Knights (Expeditionary)
- HSC-26 Chargers (Expeditionary)
- HSC-28 Dragon Whales (Expeditionary)
- Helicopter Sea Combat Weapons School, Atlantic (HSCWSL)

==== Commander, Patrol and Reconnaissance Group (COMPATRECONGRU) ====
(Commander, Patrol and Reconnaissance Group is dual hatted as Commander, Patrol and Reconnaissance Group Pacific. S/He commands the Pacific Fleet Patrol and Reconnaissance Wing TEN under that hat)

- VP-30 Pro's Nest (FRS)
- Maritime Patrol and Reconnaissance Weapons School (MPRWS)
- (PATRECONFORLANT DET AMPO Jacksonville)
- Commander, Patrol and Reconnaissance Wing 11
  - (COMPATRECONWING ELEVEN DET AIMD)
  - VP-5 Mad Foxes
  - VP-8 Tigers
  - VP-10 Red Lancers
  - VP-16 War Eagles
  - VP-26 Tridents
  - VP-45 Pelicans
  - VUP-19, Jacksonville, Fla.
- Tactical Support Center (TSC), Rota
- Tactical Support Center (TSC), Sigonella

== Miscellaneous commands ==
- VX-1, Patuxent River Naval Air Station, MD
- Landing Signal Officer School
- Fleet Air Control and Surveillance Facility (FACSFAC) Jacksonville
- Fleet Air Control and Surveillance Facility (FACSFAC) Virginia Capes (VACAPES)

== See also ==
- List of United States Navy aircraft designations (pre-1962) / List of US Naval aircraft
- Military aviation
- Modern US Navy carrier air operations
- Naval aviation
- Naval Flight Officer
- United States Marine Corps Aviation
- United States Naval Aviator
- United States Pacific Fleet
- List of United States Navy aircraft wings
- List of United States Navy aircraft squadrons
- Commander, Naval Air Forces
