= VRM-40 =

US Navy aircraft squadron

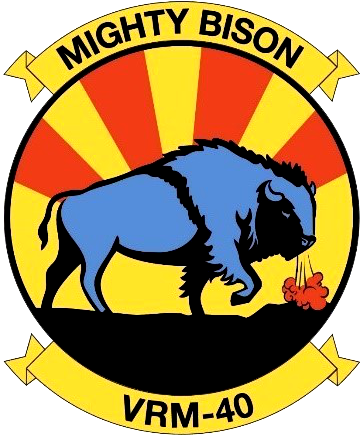
- Active: March 2022 - present
- Country: United States
- Branch: United States Navy
- Type: Aviation
- Role: Fleet logistics
- Size: Squadron
- Garrison/HQ: Naval Station Norfolk Chambers Field
- Nickname(s): Mighty Bison

Commanders
- Current commander: Matthew D. Boyce

Aircraft flown
- Transport: Bell Boeing CMV-22B Osprey

VRM-40 is a Fleet Logistics Multi-Mission Squadron of the United States Navy.

The squadron was established on 24 March 2022 at Naval Air Station North Island, California, however it moved to Naval Station Norfolk Chambers Field to February 1, 2024. The squadron itself was created as part of the larger United States Navy transition away from the legacy Grumman C-2A Greyhound to the newer Bell-Boeing CMV-22B Osprey.
