= HSC-26 =

Helicopter Sea Combat Squadron 26
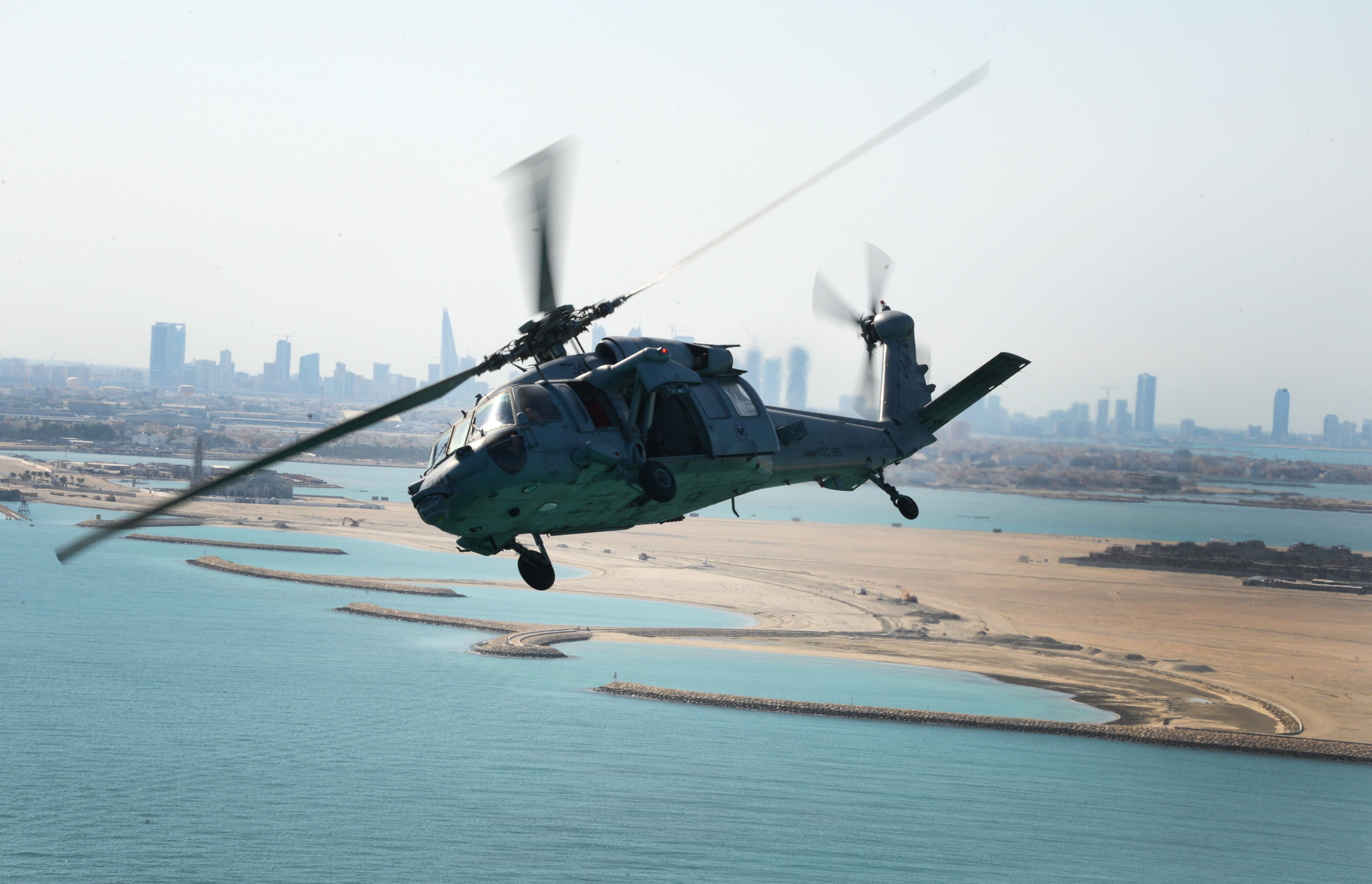
- An MH-60S Seahawk of HSC-26 over Bahrain in 2013
- Active: 1 September 1967 – present (57 years, 7 months)
- Country: United States
- Branch: United States Navy
- Type: Helicopter
- Size: Squadron
- Part of: Naval Air Force Atlantic: Helicopter Sea Combat Wing Atlantic
- Garrison/HQ: Naval Station Norfolk, Virginia; Naval Support Activity Bahrain (Det. 1)
- Nickname(s): Chargers; Desert Hawks (Det. 1)

Insignia
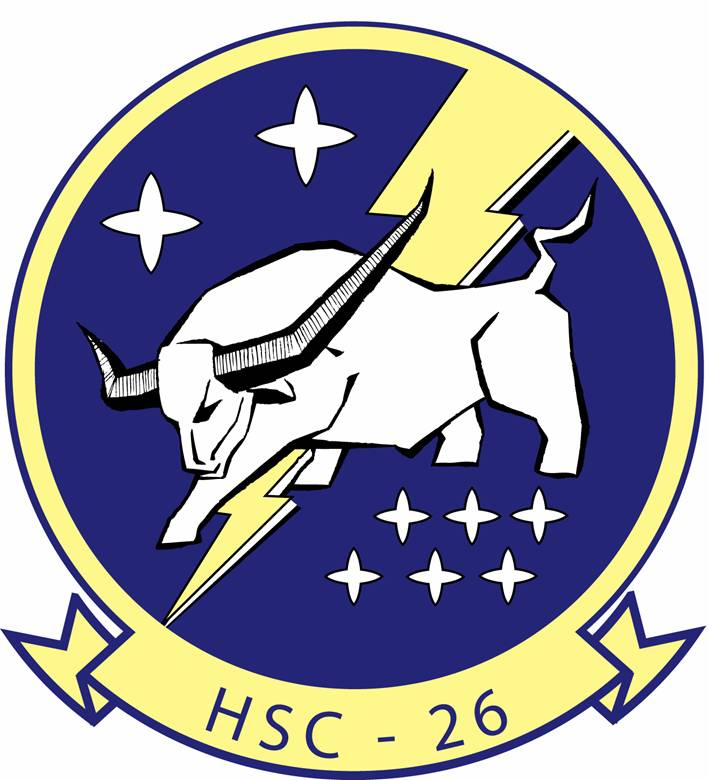
- HSC-26 emblem

Aircraft flown
- Helicopter: MH-60S Seahawk

Helicopter Sea Combat Squadron 26 (HSC-26), nicknamed the "Chargers", is a United States Navy helicopter squadron based at Naval Station Norfolk, Virginia. The squadron was established on 1 September 1967 as Helicopter Combat Support Squadron 6 (HC-6), before being redesignated to its current name on 24 August 2005. Since 2005, the squadron's Detachment 1, nicknamed the "Desert Hawks", have been stationed at Naval Support Activity Bahrain, conducting combat support for the United States Fifth Fleet. In 2017, HSC-26 deployed aboard USS Kearsarge (LHD-3) to provide disaster relief to the U.S. Virgin Islands and Puerto Rico in the aftermath of Hurricanes Irma, Jose and Maria. In 2021, members of HSC-26 deployed to the Gulf of Oman aboard USS Iwo Jima (LHD-7).
