= VF-142 =

Fighter Squadron 142
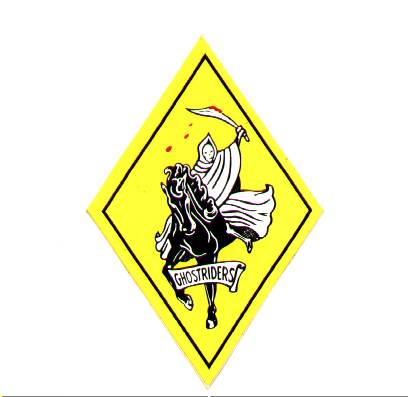
- VF-142 insignia
- Active: 24 August 1948 – 30 April 1995
- Country: United States
- Branch: USN
- Type: Fighter
- Nickname: Ghostriders

Aircraft flown
- Fighter: F4U-4 Corsair; F2H-3 Banshee; F3H-2/-2N Demon; F-4B/J Phantom II; F-14A Tomcat

VF-142 Ghostriders was a US Navy fighter squadron established on 24 August 1948 as VF-193, it was redesignated VF-142 on 15 October 1963, and disestablished on 30 April 1995.

== History ==
=== Late 1940s to the 1970s ===
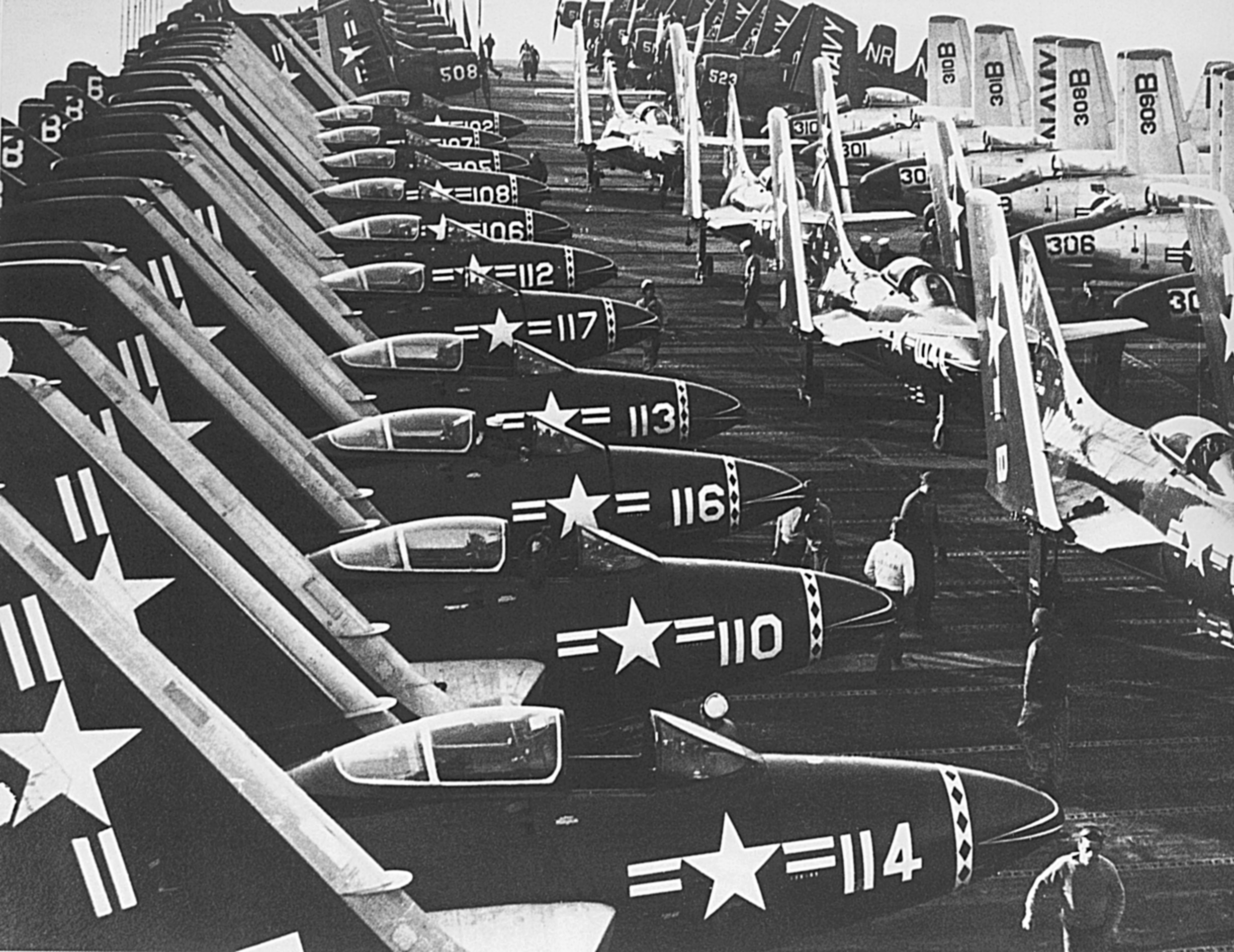
VF-193 F2H-3s on USS Oriskany in 1955.

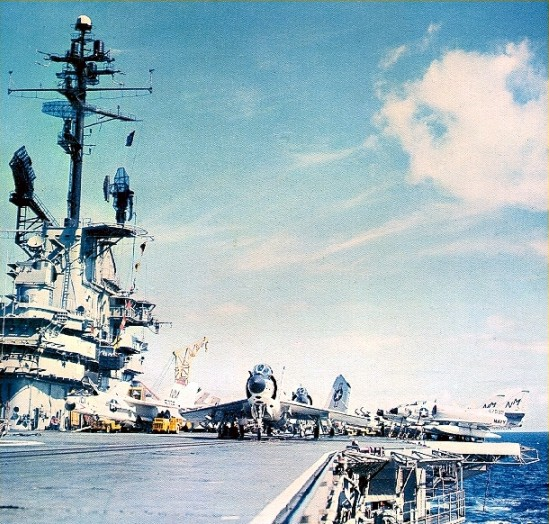
A VF-193 F3H-2 on the catapult of USS Bon Homme Richard, 1961.

Fighter Squadron 193 (VF-193) was established on 24 August 1948 and assigned to Carrier Air Group Nineteen. The squadron was equipped with the Vought F4U-4 Corsair. It made two deployments to Korea during the Korean War between 1950 and 1952 aboard the aircraft carrier USS Princeton. In 1953 the squadron transitioned to the McDonnell F2H-3 Banshee. CVG-19 then made two deployments to the Western Pacific aboard USS Oriskany, with Donald Eleazer Carr Jr as the commanding officer in 1953–1954 campaign.

In 1958 the squadron then transitioned to the subsonic McDonnell F3H-2 Demon fighter. VF-193 then made four tours with CVG-19 aboard USS Bon Homme Richard, also to the Western Pacific.

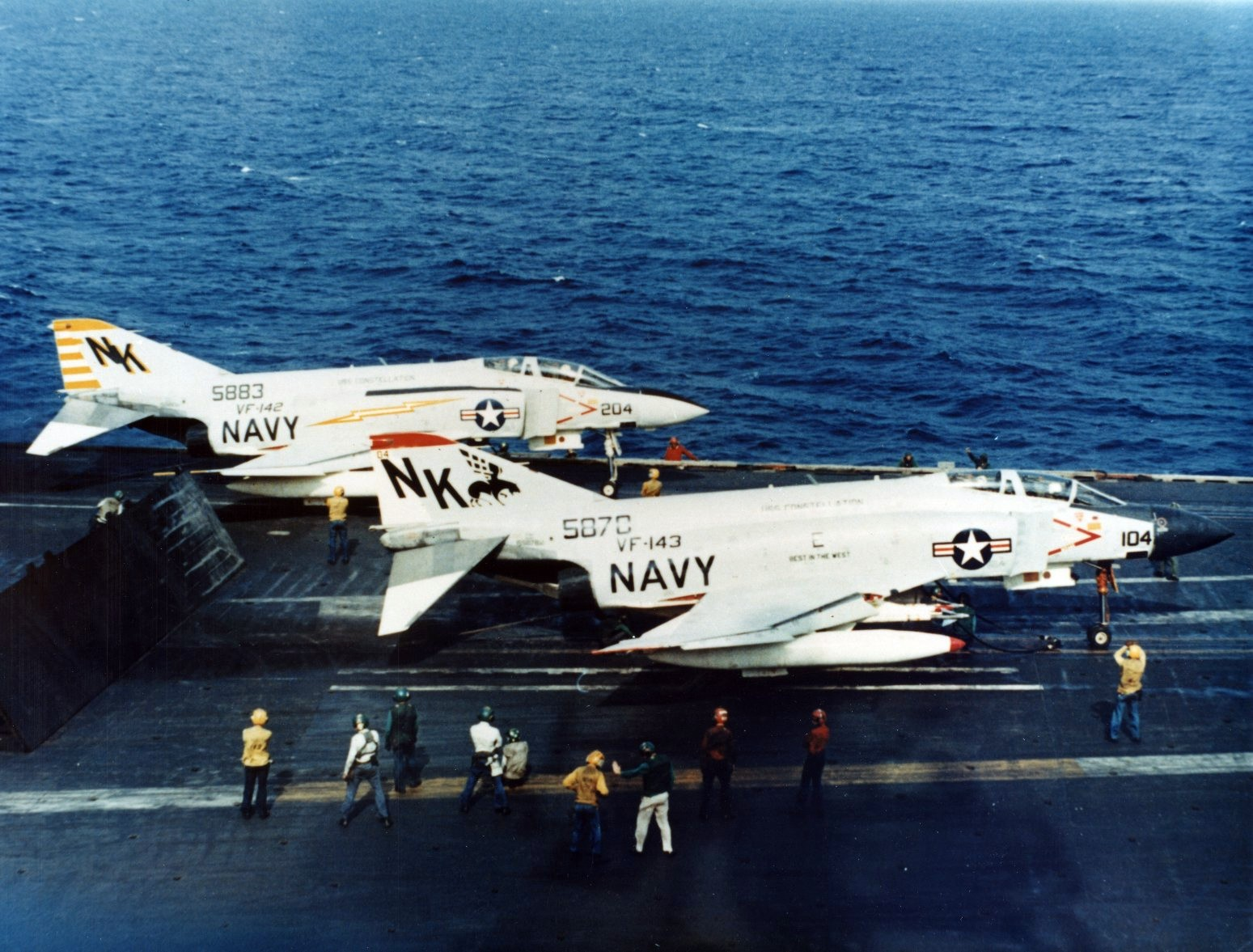
VF-142 and VF-143 F-4Js on USS Constellation, 1969/70.

In 1963, VF-193 transitioned to the McDonnell F-4B Phantom II. On 15 October 1963, the squadron was re-designated VF-142. From 1953 to 1962 there had been another fighter squadron VF-142. This squadron had been established as United States Naval Reserve squadron VF-791 Fighting Falcons and was re-designated VF-142 after becoming a regular squadron on 4 February 1953. It was again re-designated VF-96 on 1 June 1962.

Between May 1964 and May 1968, the Ghostriders made four deployments to the Pacific on board USS Ranger and the three other deployments with USS Constellation. During these cruises deployed to the Vietnam War, VF-142 downed two MiG-21s, one MiG-17 and one AN-2 Colt This was a result of finding a problem correcting pilots, RIOs and line service personnel making adjustments to the radar display that were incorrect which resulted in incorrect closing velocity information being sent to the missiles, this was discovered by an IMA (intermediate maintenance activity) technician and later verified by a Raytheon tech representative. Prior to that, success with Sparrow III missiles had not been good. VF-142 was also awarded a Battle Efficiency (E) at that time. In 1969 they transitioned from the F-4B to the F-4J and headed out for a new cruise with Constellation on 11 August 1969. VF-142 was awarded the Naval Aviation Safety Award for 1969–1970. In June 1971, VF-142 deployed with USS Enterprise for their sixth combat deployment to Vietnam.

In September 1972 VF-142 deployed for their seventh and last combat deployment to Asia. Missions were flown in support for the first B-52 strikes into the heart of North Vietnam prior to the cease fire. VF-142 downed their fifth enemy aircraft, a MiG-21, making VF-142 the Navy's first ace squadron of the war. In 1974, the Ghostriders deployed to the Mediterranean with USS America and after their return to NAS Miramar they transitioned to the F-14 Tomcat. On 1 April 1975, the squadron changed their home base from Miramar to NAS Oceana, leaving Carrier Air Wing 14 for Carrier Air Wing 6. In April 1976 VF-142 deployed to the Mediterranean Sea and conducted the first F-14 intercept of a Soviet Tu-95 Bear bomber on 23 April 1976. The Ghostriders were awarded the Battle E for their outstanding performance prior to and during the cruise.

In 1978, the Ghostriders changed both ship and air wing as Carrier Air Wing 7 and USS Dwight D. Eisenhower became their new home. In January 1979 they deployed for Eisenhower's first Mediterranean deployment. They returned to NAS Oceana on 16 July 1979.

=== 1980s ===
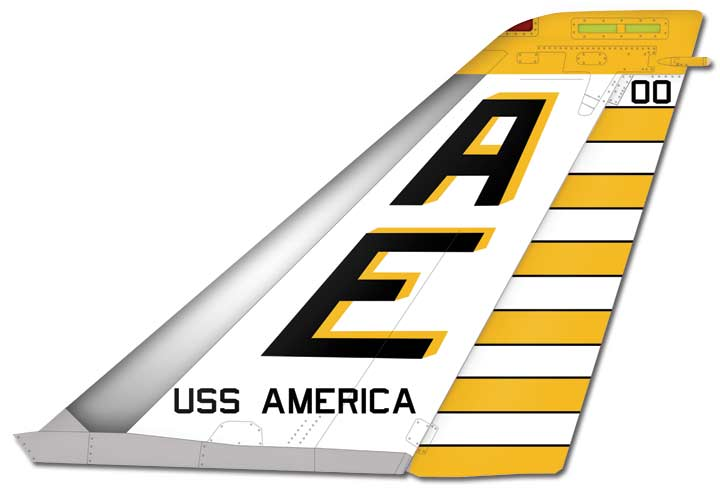
VF-142 F-14 tail markings

In 1980 they began workups before heading to the Indian Ocean on 16 April 1980. As part of the 7th Fleet, Eisenhower and CVW-7 participated in contingency operations in support of US policy during the Iran Hostage Crisis. From 16 April – 22 December 1980, the Ghostriders were at sea continuously with the exception of one five-day port visit to Singapore. For this deployment the squadron was awarded the Navy Expeditionary Medal and a Navy Unit Commendation.

Between 5 January – 15 July 1982 yet another Mediterranean cruise was underway. After this cruise the squadron conducted a 4-month training cycle which included detachments to Nellis AFB and NAS Fallon, Nevada. On 27 April 1983, VF-142 departed Norfolk, Virginia for operations in the Middle East. From mid July until the end of the deployment in December 1983, VF-142 spent all but five days at sea in support of US Marines and multinational peace-keeping forces in Beirut, Lebanon. VF-142's 32 officers and 205 enlisted men and 12 F-14s accumulated over 3,200 flight hours and 1,500 carrier landings. During this cruise, VF-142 would intercept two Libyan MiG-23s that were heading towards the carrier group, no weapons were fired.

In 1984, VF-142 had detachments to Nellis AFB, Roosevelt Roads Naval Station and NAS Fallon. In march the squadron set a new standard of excellence by achieving a 6.2:1 kill ratio during the Fleet Fighter Air Combat Maneuvering Readiness Program (FFARP) and captured the CVW-7 ACM shootdown Trophy for the second year in a row.

On 7 May 1984, the Ghostriders departed Norfolk for training which followed by a visit to Normandy for the D-Day 40th Anniversary celebration. From 10 July to 19 July and again from 8 August – 7 September 1984, VF-142 cruised the Caribbean Islands for a very successful Operation Readiness Exercise. In October the squadron deployed to the Mediterranean for one of its most successful deployments ever. VF-142 flew over 4000 accident and FOD free hours and dominated the competition for the coveted Battle E award. They returned to NAS Oceana on 7 May 1985, the Ghostriders had a little time home with the loved ones before leaving again on 18 July for the Central American operating area. During this time, they also participated in Ocean Safari, a 3 carrier battle group exercise in the North Atlantic. The squadron finally returned home on 4 September 1985 for an extended turnaround while Ike went into the shipyard for its first overhaul. After a change of command in April 1987, the squadron left NAS Oceana on 2 May for a CVW-7 weapons training detachment to NAS Fallon. There, the Ghostriders spearheaded what was described as "the best fighter performance ever seen " by the Commander of the Naval Strike and Air Warfare Center.

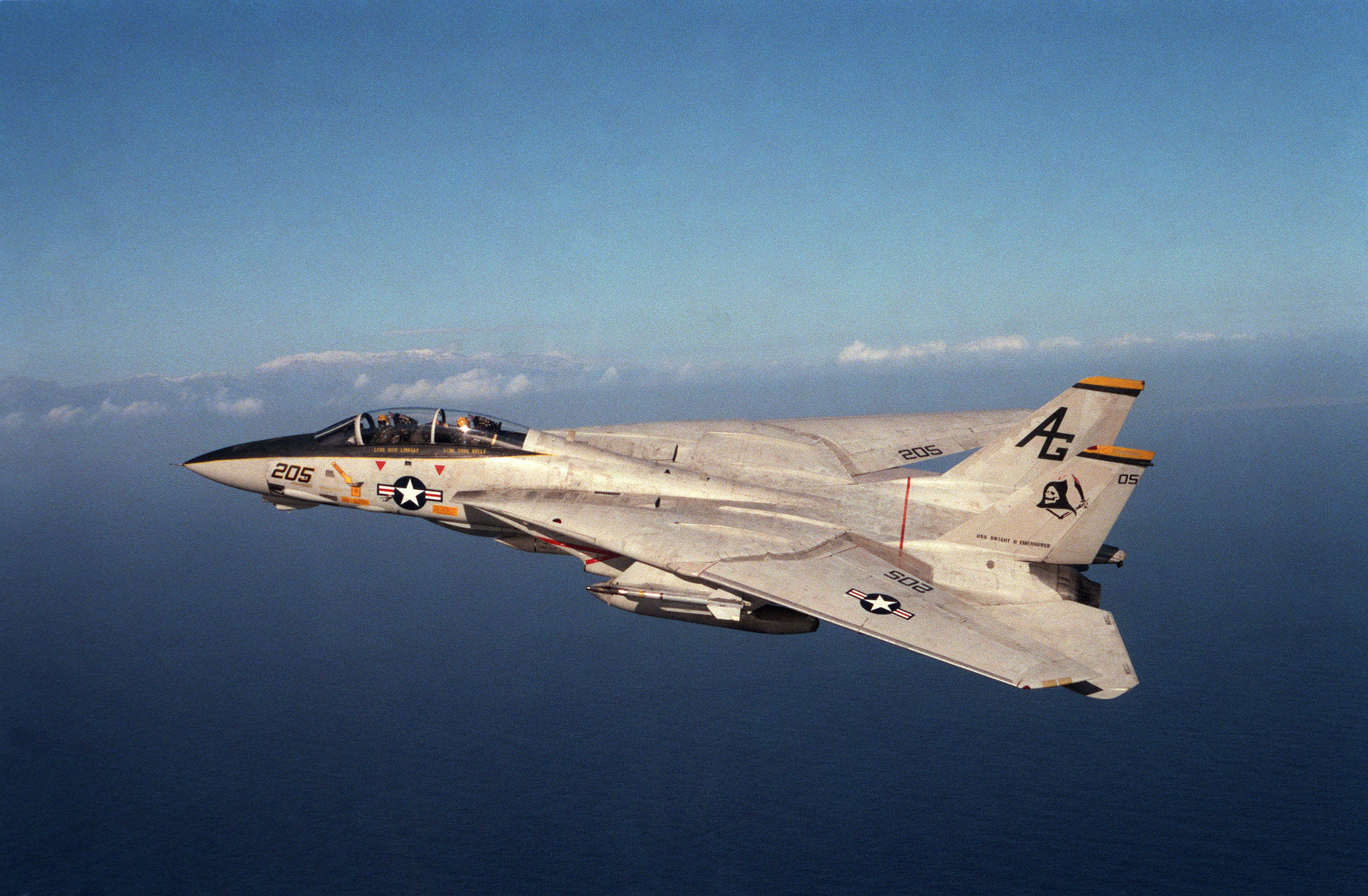
An F-14A Tomcat from VF-142, 1985.

From 15 June – 23 July 1987 the Ghostriders were embarked Dwight D. Eisenhower for her shakedown cruise. Thus began several short sea periods in preparation for their upcoming Mediterranean cruise. The squadron spent five weeks in the Caribbean where they participated in joint service operations with the Venezuelan Air Force. In September and late October, during operations in the Caribbean, the Ghostriders successfully fired two AIM-54, three AIM-7 and four AIM-9 air-to-air missiles. January 1988 saw the Ghostriders once again deployed with Dwight D. Eisenhower. The squadron started the year off on the right foot contributing directly to the success of the first fleet exercise of 1988. The exercise, which also involved USS Forrestal in dual carrier operations, was staged against adversary forces consisting of US Navy and Air Forces assets. The Ghostriders flew around the clock for five days testing their abilities in all aspects of anti-air warfare. Following the exercise, they successfully fired and guided three air-to-air missiles.

On 29 February 1988, the squadron departed NAS Oceana for a 6-month Mediterranean deployment with Dwight D. Eisenhower. The cruise was highlighted by the Ghostriders participation in several joint NATO, Air Force and Navy exercises. VF-142 flew overland and over-water missions in several highly successful NATO exercises with Spain, France and Tunisia. The squadron flew over 1,200 sorties totaling 2,500 hours during a six-month deployment. Following a brief stand down period, VF-142 commenced preparation for the Fleet Fighter Air Combat Maneuvering Readiness Program. After a highly successful FFARP in October and November, the Ghostriders participated in a missile exercise at Roosevelt Roads from 7–18 December 1988. VF-142 fired two AIM-54, three AIM-7 and one AIM-9 missiles to culminate an extremely successful year of operations.

1989 began with an air-to-air gunnery detachment to NAS Key West. April was spent preparing for and then deploying with Dwight D. Eisenhower for a week of independent steaming exercises. Following a brief port visit to Norfolk, the aircraft carrier and her airwing departed to take part in the highly successful exercise Solid Shield 89, along with thousands of personnel from the Marines, Navy, Air Force and Army.

After returning from Solid Shield, the squadron began transitioning to the F-14B, receiving its first new aircraft on 24 March 1989. The F-14B, with much more powerful engines and several avionics upgrades, represented a long-awaited update to the Tomcat. The Ghostriders and their sister squadron, the VF-143 Pukin' Dogs, were the Navy's first squadrons to fly the FFARP, conduct airwing strike exercises at NAS Fallon and became the first to deploy with the new F-14B.

=== 1990s ===
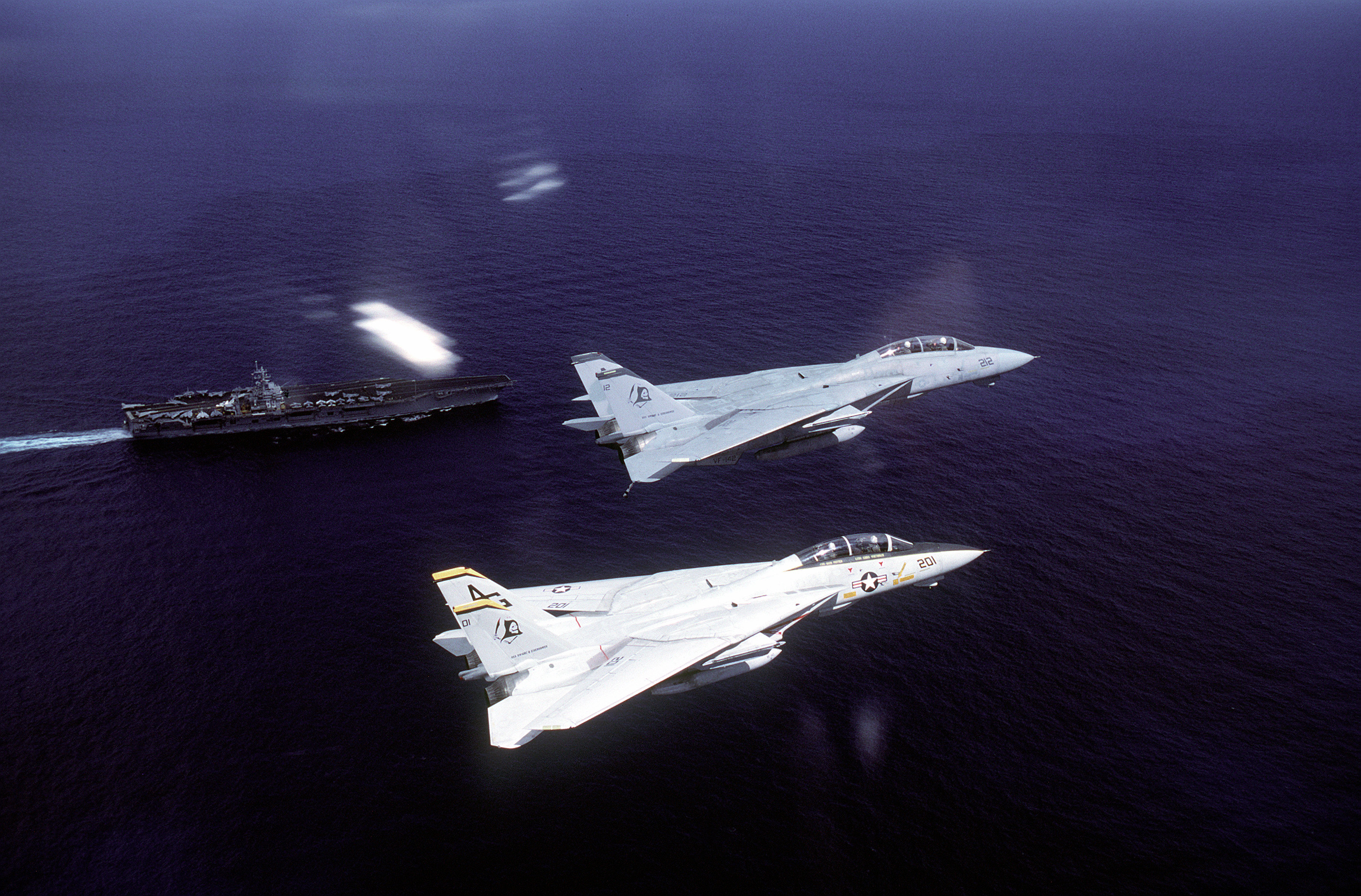
F-14 Tomcats from VF-142 overfly USS Dwight D. Eisenhower

The squadron deployed on 8 March 1990, to the Mediterranean for a six-month deployment once again with Dwight D. Eisenhower. Ghostriders aircrew engaged many NATO aircraft in exercise Dragon Hammer 90, and the new F-14Bs proved to be superior performers. The aircraft carrier transited the Suez Canal on 8 August in response to Iraq's invasion of Kuwait. Dwight D. Eisenhower and Airwing 7 were the first to arrive and took up station in the Red Sea in support of Operation Desert Shield. The first ever Red Sea battle group was well protected under the F-14Bs flying combat air patrol. The squadron exceeded 2,300 flight hours and logged over 1,200 arrested landings in their new Tomcats. The Ghostriders maintenance did an outstanding job in maintaining the new systems, and the squadron completed 1227 of 1229 assigned sorties. With a conflict in the Persian Gulf brewing, the Ghostriders took a short break after returning, but quickly got back on an accelerated turnaround schedule in case the need arose for more carriers in the Middle East.

In October 1990, the squadron got in a quick at sea period for some carrier refresher. From the end of November to the end of December saw the squadron completing the most successful FFARP ever with an 11.5:1 kill ratio. This earned the squadron the FFARP trophy for 1990. The Ghostriders quickly resumed full training as the crisis in the Middle East loomed. The squadron combined regular turnaround training with constant carrier qualification readiness to provide a ready asset. After the crisis passed the next deployment was finally set for September 1991. Dwight D. Eisenhower departed Norfolk on 26 September 1991 for a 6-month deployment to the Persian Gulf. While acting as a deterrent to regional aggression, the Ghostriders participated in many joint and multi-national exercises throughout the six months in the region. On the way home, Dwight D. Eisenhower was tasked to be the focal point of Teamwork 92, a large multi-national exercise in the North Atlantic.

After a brief break that followed their six-month deployment, the Ghostriders returned to full speed preparing for their transition to USS George Washington. The newest carrier in the fleet at the time welcomed CVW-7 in the early fall of 1992 and quickly got underway with a six-week shakedown cruise.

Early 1993 saw the Ghostriders excel once again in FFARP against adversaries of VF-43. With the new emphasis on using Tomcat in an air-to-ground role, the Ghostriders developed an entirely new syllabus for FFARP which incorporated the F-14B as self-escorted strike-fighters. The squadron then spent several weeks in the Spring flying as adversaries for the US Air Force Weapons School in Nevada. While in this detachment at Nellis AFB, the aircrew continued to train as strikers by dropping live Mk-80 series bombs and the first Rockeye delivery of a fleet F-14. The Ghostriders pushed into mid 1993 with a brief at sea period for carrier training and integration with the other squadrons of CVW-7. Immediately following, the squadron completed the newly developed air-to-ground intensive AARP training. The new syllabus emphasized the latest in F-14B strike tactics. The Ghostriders deployed in May 1994, on board George Washington for a six-month cruise. Their work included peace keeping operations over Bosnia-Herzegovina and Iraq. For their exceptional work they were awarded the Battle "E" and Golden Wrench. Due to budget cuts and air wing reorganization, VF-142 was disestablished in April 1995.

== See also ==
- History of the United States Navy
- List of inactive United States Navy aircraft squadrons
- List of United States Navy aircraft squadrons

== Sources ==
- VF-142 History
