= HSC-22 =

Helicopter Sea Combat Squadron 22
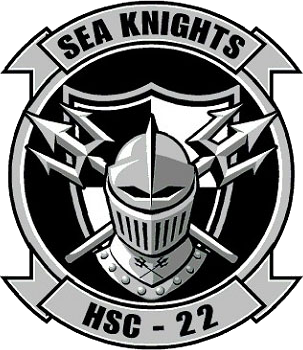
- HSC-22 Insignia
- Active: 29 September 2006 – 30 June 2023 01 April 2026 - present
- Country: United States of America
- Branch: United States Navy
- Type: Sea combat operations
- Role: Logistics Search and rescue Force Protection; Disaster Response Special Warfare
- Size: 231 Personnel
- Garrison/HQ: Naval Station Norfolk Chambers Field
- Nickname: "Sea Knights"
- Mottos: PRAESES, ARMIS, GERO (PROTECT, FIGHT, SUPPORT)
- Colors: Black, silver, and white
- Mascot: Knight
- Engagements: Global War On Terror; Operation Unified Response; Operation Odyssey Dawn; Operation Unified Protector
- Decorations: Battle Effectiveness Award

Commanders
- Current commander: 2026- CDR Albert J. Schrautemyer; Past Commanders; 2021-2023 CDR Aaron G. Berger; 2020-2021 CDR Timothy G. Drosinos; 2019-2020 CDR Mattew A. Wright; 2018-2019 CDR Matthew N. Persiani; 2017-18 CAPT Shawn T. Bailey; 2016-17 CDR Michael W. Hoskins; 2015-16 CDR Kevin P. Zayac; 2014-15 CDR Wayne W. Anderews, III; 2012-14 CDR Paul C. de Marcellus; 2011-12 CDR Timothy E. Symons; 2010-11 CDR Brendan J. Murphy; 2009-10 CDR Christopher D. Hayes; 2008-09 CDR Daniel F. Olson; 2006-08 CDR Michael M. McMillan, Jr.

Helicopter Sea Combat Squadron 22 (HSC-22) was a United States Navy helicopter squadron based at NAS Chambers Field (KNGU) in Norfolk, Virginia. The "Sea Knights" were Established on 29 September 2006, and have multiple missions including vertical replenishment, search and rescue, air-sea rescue and anti-surface warfare. The Sea Knights flew the MH-60S Knighthawk helicopter, manufactured by Sikorsky Aircraft in Stratford, Connecticut and the Northrop Grumman MQ-8B/C Fire Scout. It is the first new helicopter squadron at Naval Station Norfolk in 22 years. HSC-22 is the sister squadron of HSC-23 "Wild Cards" stationed at Naval Air Station North Island in Coronado, California.

The squadron conducted its final operational mission on 15 February 2023.

OPNAV Notice dated 14 Mar 2025 announced the reestablishment of Helicopter Sea Combat Squadron TWO TWO effective 1 April 2026.

== Command emblem ==
The Knight's helmet symbolizes the American warrior prepared for battle. The crossed tridents symbolize the sea combat capabilities of our helicopter in the maritime environment. The quartered shield represents a stout defense, strength, protection and invulnerability. The black stands for constancy, steadfastness, and fidelity while the silver and white stand for peace and sincerity. Together the three colors symbolize an undying resolution to protect the key tenets of freedom.

== See also ==
- History of the United States Navy
- List of United States Navy aircraft squadrons
