= John Mazach =

American Navy admiral

John J. Mazach
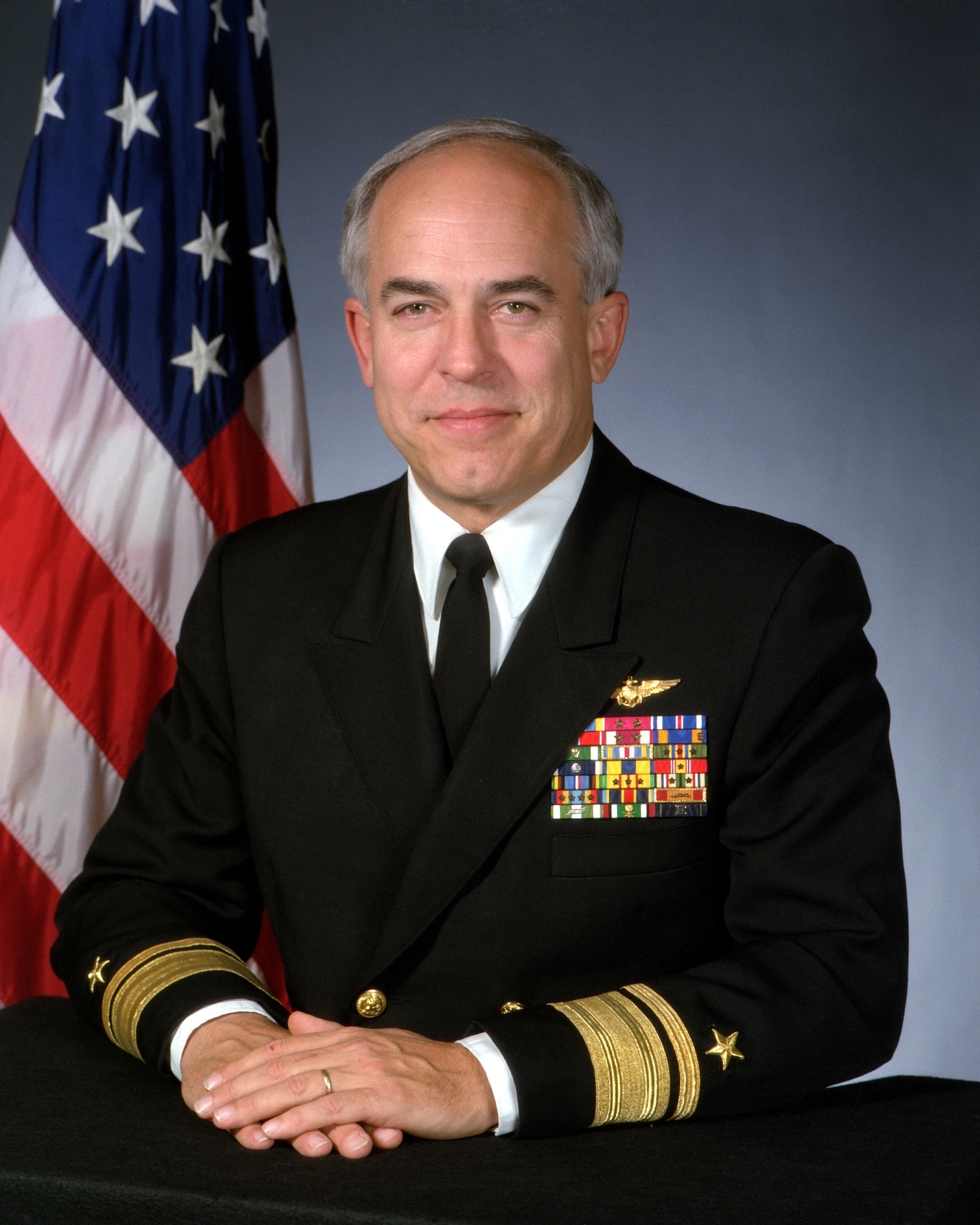
- Mazach as a Rear Admiral in 1994
- Born: 10 January 1944 (age 81); Coffeyville, Kansas
- Branch: United States Navy
- Rank: Retired vice admiral
- Commands: Naval Air Force Atlantic; Carrier Group Two; USS America; USS Seattle; Carrier Air Wing Three; VA-15
- Battles / wars: Vietnam; Gulf War
- Awards: Defense Superior Service Medal; Legion of Merit (3); Distinguished Flying Cross

John James Mazach (born 10 January 1944) is a vice admiral who retired from the United States Navy at the end of 1998. His last assignment on active duty was as commander of Naval Air Force Atlantic.

Mazach was born in Coffeyville, Kansas and raised in Nashville, Tennessee. He earned a B.A. degree from Vanderbilt University in June 1966. After flight training, Mazach was designated a naval aviator in October 1967.

Mazach served with VA-87 from June 1968 to December 1970, flying an A-7B Corsair II from the carrier Ticonderoga in Southeast Asia during the Vietnam War. He also served with VA-105 and VA-174. Mazach joined VA-15 in December 1977. He became executive officer of the squadron and then served as its commanding officer from April 1979 to June 1980.

Mazach was given command of Carrier Air Wing Three from February 1982 to May 1984. During this period, the air wing was deployed on the carrier John F. Kennedy to the Mediterranean Sea. Mazach supervised combat flights from John F. Kennedy after she was ordered to Lebanon in October 1983.

Mazach served as the commanding officer of the combat support ship Seattle from June 1986 to February 1988. He was next given command of the carrier America from October 1989 to February 1991. During this time, she was deployed to the Red Sea and Persian Gulf in support of Operations Desert Shield and Desert Storm. Mazach was detached from America in May 1991.

Promoted to rear admiral, Mazach served as commander of Carrier Group Two from June 1993 to September 1994. In March 1996, he became commander of Naval Air Force, U.S. Atlantic Fleet.

After leaving the navy at the beginning of 1999, Mazach joined the Northrop Grumman Corporation. In March 2008, he was appointed Shipbuilding sector vice president of business development.

As a retiree, Mazach became an advisor to the Naval Reserve Officers Training Corps at his alma mater, Vanderbilt University. As of 2011, he was married to Vanderbilt alumna Pat Waggoner Mazach and living in Virginia Beach, Virginia.
