= USS Ponchatoula =

Two ships of the United States Navy have been named USS Ponchatoula or USNS Ponchatoula, after the Ponchatoula Creek in Louisiana.

- USS Ponchatoula (AOG-38) was a tanker commissioned in 1944.
- USNS Ponchatoula (T-AO-148) was a fleet oiler in service from 1956 to 1992.
