= Strike Fighter Wing Atlantic =

- Active: 1 September 1993 - Present
- Country: United States
- Branch: United States Navy
- Type: Fighter/Attack
- Role: Type Wing
- Part of: Naval Air Force Atlantic
- Garrison/HQ: NAS Oceana

Commanders
- Commodore: Capt. Christopher S. Dentzer
- Deputy Commodore: Capt. Eric McQueen
- Command Master Chief: CMDCM Shawn Fleming

Aircraft flown
- Fighter: F/A-18C/D Hornet; F/A-18E/F Super Hornet

Strike Fighter Wing, U.S. Atlantic Fleet (SFWL) (aka Strike Fighter Wing Atlantic, SFWL, STRKFIGHTWINGLANT) is the U.S. Navy's largest type wing with 16 squadrons flying more than 300 aircraft, amongst them different variants of the McDonnell Douglas F/A-18 Hornet and Boeing F/A-18E/F Super Hornet. The wing, based at NAS Oceana, is also home to the east coast F/A-18 Fleet Replacement Squadron (FRS) which trains pilots and Weapon Systems Officers (WSOs) in the Hornet and Super Hornet before they are assigned to operational fleet squadrons. The fleet squadrons deploy as part of carrier air wings (CVWs) on aircraft carriers on both the east and west coasts.

== History ==
The wing was established in 1970 as Commander, Light Attack Wing One (CLAW One) at NAS Cecil Field, Florida. With the introduction of the F/A-18 in the late 1980s, the command was redesignated as SFWL on 1 September 1993. As a result of the Base Realignment and Closure Commission (BRAC) decision to close NAS Cecil Field in 1999, the wing relocated to NAS Oceana, Virginia in 1998. In 2006, SFWL subsumed the staff of Commander, Fighter Wing Atlantic upon the retirement of the Grumman F-14 Tomcat and that wing's disestablishment.

== Mission ==
Strike Fighter Wing's mission is to provide U.S. Atlantic Fleet commanders with combat-ready Strike Fighter squadrons which are fully trained, properly crewed, well maintained and supported. The wing is responsible for the readiness, training, administration, and maintenance support of all Atlantic Fleet F/A-18A-F Hornet and Super Hornet squadrons. Although this basic responsibility extends throughout the deployment cycle of individual units, direct operational control of fleet squadrons is generally retained by Carrier Air Wing commanders, whether deployed or not. The Wing is also the lead advocate for issues, maintenance developments and operational readiness factors impacting the VFA community.

== Organization ==
SFWL is commanded by a captain, who is also known as the Wing "Commodore". The wing staff consists of approximately 50 officer, enlisted and civilian personnel. CSFWL reports directly to Commander Naval Air Force U.S. Atlantic Fleet in Norfolk, Va.

== Assigned units ==
Strike Fighter Wing Atlantic exercises administrative and operational command over one Fleet Replacement Squadron (VFA-106) and administrative command over 16 operational fleet F/A-18 squadrons.

Each Strike Fighter squadron normally consists of 10-12 aircraft, 22 officers and approximately 190 enlisted personnel.

- VFA-11 Red Rippers
- VFA-31 Tomcatters
- VFA-32 Fighting Swordsmen
- VFA-34 Blue Blasters
- VFA-37 Ragin' Bulls
- VFA-81 Sunliners
- VFA-83 Rampagers
- VFA-87 Golden Warriors
- VFA-103 Jolly Rogers
- VFA-105 Gunslingers
- VFA-106 Gladiators (FRS)
- VFA-131 Wildcats
- VFA-143 Pukin' Dogs
- VFA-211 Fighting Checkmates
- VFA-213 Black Lions

Additionally, CSFWL exercises command over Strike Fighter Weapons School Atlantic.

== See also ==
- Naval aviation
- List of United States Navy aircraft wings
- Modern US Navy carrier air operations
- List of United States Navy aircraft designations (pre-1962) / List of US Naval aircraft
- United States Naval Aviator
- List of United States Navy aircraft squadrons
- List of Inactive United States Navy aircraft squadrons
