= VA83 =

VA-83 has the following meanings:

- Attack Squadron 83 (U.S. Navy)
- State Route 83 (Virginia)
- Virgin Australia Flight 83
