= Carrier Air Wing Seven =

United States Navy aviation wing Navy 620 HS-14

- Active: 20 July 1943 – Present
- Country: United States
- Branch: United States Navy
- Type: Carrier Air Wing
- Part of: Carrier Strike Group Twelve
- Garrison/HQ: NAS Oceana
- Nickname: Freedom Fighters
- Tail Code: AG
- Engagements: World War II; Korean War; Operation Desert Shield; Operation Desert Storm; Operation Deny Flight; Operation Southern Watch; Operation Enduring Freedom; Operation Iraqi Freedom; Operation Inherent Resolve; Operation Epic Fury

Commanders
- Commander: Captain Matthew K. Lewis

Carrier Air Wing Seven (CVW-7) is a United States Navy aircraft carrier air wing based at Naval Air Station Oceana, Virginia. At the moment, CVW-7 is assigned to the USS George H.W. Bush. The tail code of aircraft assigned to CVW-7 is AG.

CW-7's insignia features an aircraft tailhook in the shape of the number 7.

== Mission ==
To conduct carrier air warfare operations and assist in the planning, control, coordination and integration of seven air wing squadrons in support of carrier air warfare including; Interception and destruction of enemy aircraft and missiles in all-weather conditions to establish and maintain local air superiority. All-weather offensive air-to-surface attacks, Detection, localization, and destruction of enemy ships and submarines to establish and maintain local sea control. Aerial photographic, sighting, and electronic intelligence for naval and joint operations. Airborne early warning service to fleet forces and shore warning nets. Airborne electronic countermeasures. In-flight refueling operations to extend the range and the endurance of air wing aircraft and Search and rescue operations.

== Subordinate units ==
CVW-7 consists of the following squadrons.

Code	Insignia	Squadron	Nickname	Assigned Aircraft
VFA-103		Strike Fighter Squadron 103	Jolly Rogers	F/A-18E/F Super Hornet
VFA-83		Strike Fighter Squadron 83	Rampagers	F/A-18E Super Hornet
VFA-131		Strike Fighter Squadron 131	Wildcats	F/A-18E Super Hornet
VFA-105		Strike Fighter Squadron 105	Gunslingers	F/A-18E/F Super Hornet
VAQ-140		Electronic Attack Squadron 140	Patriots	EA-18G Growler
VAW-116		Airborne Early Warning Squadron 116	Sun Kings	E-2C Hawkeye
HSC-5		Helicopter Sea Combat Squadron 5	Nightdippers	MH-60S Seahawk
HSM-46		Helicopter Maritime Strike Squadron 46	Grandmasters	MH-60R Seahawk
VRC-40		Fleet Logistics Support Squadron 40 Det. 3	Rawhides	C-2A Greyhound

== History ==
=== World War II to 1950 ===
Carrier Air Wing Seven was originally established 20 July 1943 at Naval Air Station Alameda, California, as Carrier Air Group Eighteen. After an intensive training period, the air group embarked in USS Intrepid and participated in combat operations against the Japanese during World War II. In September 1945, the air group transferred to Naval Air Station Quonset Point, Rhode Island. On 15 November the Navy changed the designation scheme for its Carrier Air Groups and CVG-18 was re-designated CVAG-7. On 1 September 1948 the designation scheme was again changed and the Air Group became Carrier Air Group Seven (CVG-7) (it was the second Air Group to carry the CVG-7 designation; the first CVG-7 existed from January 1944 to July 1946).

=== Cold War ===
During the Korean War, the air group flew close air support strikes, attacks on industrial facilities and supply line interdiction missions from the deck of USS Bon Homme Richard.

After moving from Quonset Point to Naval Air Station Oceana in 1958, the Air Group teamed up with USS Independence and deployed as the first all jet air wing. On 20 December 1963 all Carrier Air Groups were re-designated Carrier Air Wings and CVG-7 became Carrier Air Wing Seven (CVW-7). During the years from 1966 – 1977 the air wing completed seven Mediterranean deployments in USS Independence and participated in numerous North Atlantic Treaty Organization (NATO) exercises. In early 1978, Air Wing Seven embarked in USS Dwight D. Eisenhower for shakedown and weapons training in the Roosevelt Roads, Puerto Rico operating area.

On 1 March 1978, Air Wing SEVEN became permanently assigned to USS Dwight D. Eisenhower and deployed in January 1979 for IKE's maiden, Mediterranean voyage. From April through December 1980, the air wing embarked for an Indian Ocean deployment in support of operations to rescue the hostages in Tehran, following in September and October by NATO exercises in the North Atlantic. From January to July 1982, Air Wing Seven embarked for a Mediterranean deployment which included support for the evacuation of Americans from Lebanon. In April 1983, the IKE/CVW-7 team began another Mediterranean deployment that included the first 1,000-nautical-mile (1,900 km; 1,200 mi) over water night intercept for an F-14, multiple Carrier Battle Group operations with USS Independence and USS John F. Kennedy, and support of the Multi-national Peace Keeping Force in Beirut, Lebanon.

Reunited in 1987, the IKE/CVW-7 team worked up in preparation for Mediterranean Deployment, followed by extensive work ups in preparation for a 1990 deployment. Mediterranean Deployment 2-90 became a Red Sea excursion as the IKE/CVW-7 Battle Group was the first on scene to deter Iraqi aggression in Operation Desert Shield. Once relieved IKE/CVW-7 returned home and began a compressed turnaround training cycle for a May 1991 CENTCOM deployment. As Operation Desert Storm progressed to quick victory, the deployment was delayed to reestablish the normal CV deployment cycle. In September 1991 CVW-7/IKE deployed to the Red Sea/Persian Gulf as part of post hostilities Operation Desert Storm. They were the first CV and Air Wing team to deploy for a second time to the Gulf War.

=== 1990s operations ===
In September 1992 CVW-7 initially embarked in USS George Washington for a weapons system shakedown. The air wing deployed on USS George Washington as a component of Commander, Cruiser Destroyer Group Two on 20 May 1994. Following refresher carrier qualifications, the Battle Group transited to Portsmouth, England to participate in the Commemoration of the 50th anniversary of the D-Day invasion. The Commemoration activities were highlighted by port visits to England, Brest, France and President Bill Clinton's stay aboard the carrier.

Following turnover with USS Saratoga, the Battle Group proceeded directly to the Adriatic to conduct operations in support of Operation Deny Flight and Sharp Guard. In response to aggressive Iraqi troop movements south towards Kuwait, the George Washington Battle Group transited the Suez Canal at maximum speed. Persian Gulf Operations Vigilant and Southern Watch were resumed on 15 October 1994. After Iraqi forces turned north and tensions eased, the Battle Group returned to the Mediterranean Sea. Turnover with the IKE Battle Group took place north of the Suez Canal and USS George Washington/CVW-7 returned to a rainy Norfolk on 17 November 1994.

In September 1996 CVW-7 began preparations for a 26 February 1998 around the world deployment in USS John C. Stennis. This Joint Task Group 98-2 deployment included over four months on station in the Northern Persian Gulf supporting Operation Southern Watch.

=== Into the 21st century ===
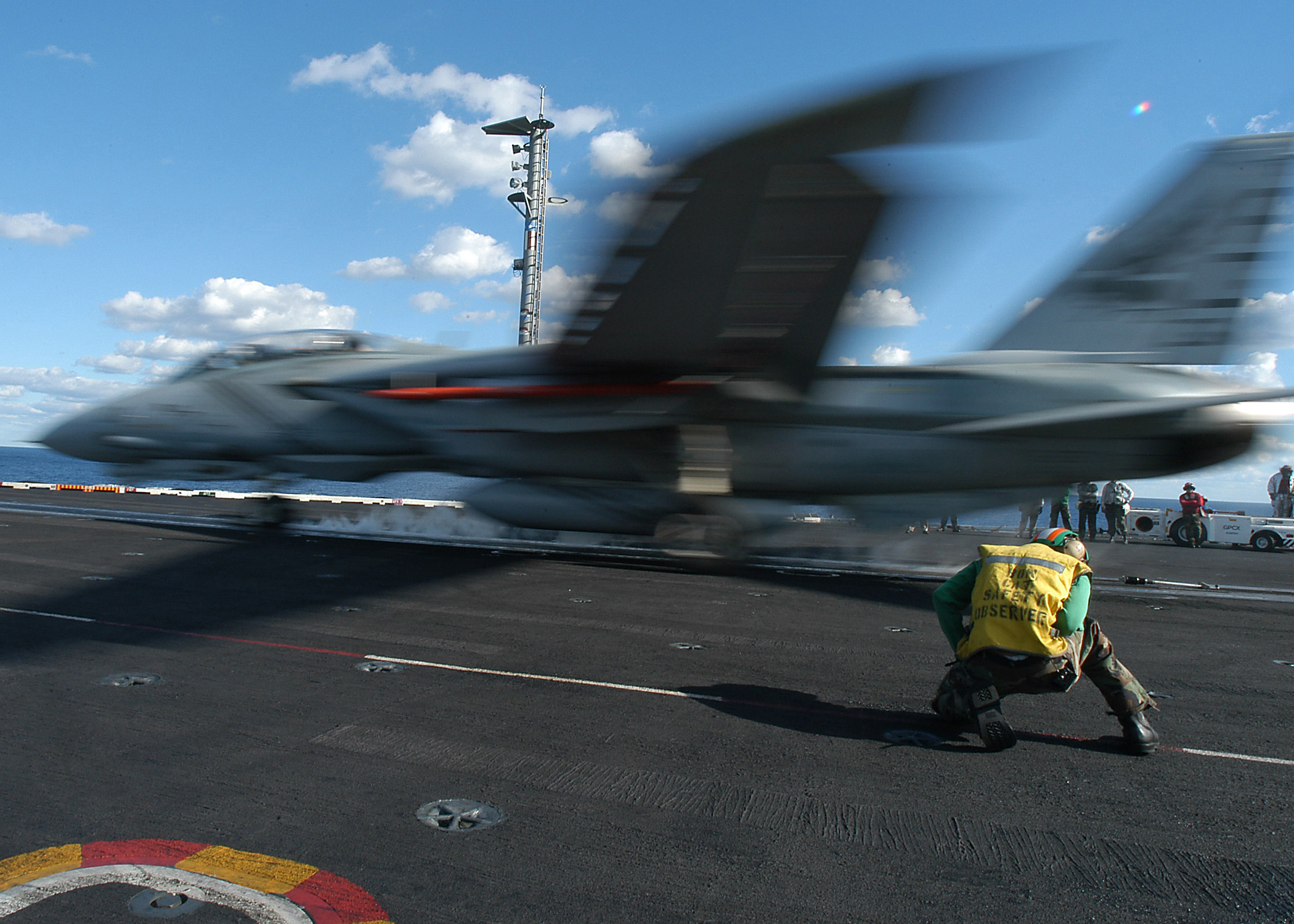
At sea aboard USS George Washington (CVN-73), 21 Nov. 2003. Flight Deck Safety Observer, Aviation Boatswain's Mate 3rd Class Harrison Brookes braces himself as an F-14B Tomcat, assigned to Carrier Air Wing Seven is launched from one of four steam driven catapults on the ship's flight deck.

In 2000 CVW-7 was again deployed with USS Dwight D. Eisenhower to the Mediterranean Sea and the Indian Ocean. Two years later, the Wing was deployed to the same regions aboard USS John F. Kennedy and aboard USS George Washington, before finally returning to Dwight D. Eisenhower in 2006–2007. Two deployments aboard Dwight D. Eisenhower followed in 2009 and 2010.

As part of Operation Vigilant Resolve, on 28 April 2004, Carrier Air Wing Seven squadrons VFA-136, VFA-131, VF-11, and VF-143 flew combat air sorties against insurgents in Fallujah, dropping 13 GBU-12 Paveway II laser-guided bombs on insurgent positions, while providing combat air support to the 1st Marine Expeditionary Force.

In April and May 2008, CVW-7's strike fighter squadrons accompanied George Washington from Norfolk, Virginia, to San Diego, California, around Cape Horn. Although formally assigned to CVW-17, the squadrons kept their "AG" tail code. Four deployments aboard Dwight D. Eisenhower followed in 2009, 2010, 2012 and 2013.

In 2015, CVW-7 was reassigned to USS Harry S. Truman and began a scheduled deployment to the U.S. 6th and 5th Fleet areas of operation on 16 November.

On 22 May 2018, CVW-7 was assigned to USS Abraham Lincoln.

From 10 August 2022 to 23 April 2023, CVW-7 deployed with Carrier Strike Group 10 (CSG-10), aboard USS George H.W. Bush (CVN-77). USNI News reported that CSG-10 is most likely set to relieve Carrier Strike Group 8 (CSG-8) and its flagship, the USS Harry S. Truman (CVN-75) with embarked Carrier Air Wing One (CVW-1), in the Mediterranean Sea.

== Current force ==
=== Fixed-wing aircraft ===
- F/A-18E/F Super Hornet
- EA-18G Growler
- E-2 Hawkeye
- C-2 Greyhound

=== Rotary wing aircraft ===
- MH-60S Seahawk
- MH-60R Seahawk
