= NFE =

NFE may refer to:

- Naval Auxiliary Landing Field Fentress, a military airport in Virginia, USA (by FAA LID code)
- Nearly free electron model
- Non-formal education
- New French Extremity
- Nordisk familjebok ecology
