= Naval Air Station Oceana Airshow =

NAS Oceana Airshow
- Frequency: Annual
- Location: Naval Air Station Oceana
- Years active: 1953-Present
- Inaugurated: 1953
- Previous event: September 21–22, 2024
- Next event: September 20–21, 2025
- Attendance: ~300,000
- Website: www.oceanaairshow.com

The Naval Air Station Oceana Airshow, often shorted to just NAS Oceana Airshow, is an annual air show that occurs in September each year at Naval Air Station Oceana, in Virginia Beach.

== History ==
The first Airshow was held in May 1953, to celebrate Armed Forces Day. The 1955 Airshow garnered around 5,000 total spectators. The Airshow became a unique attraction for then Princess Anne County.

In 1963, the Blue Angels made their debut at the Airshow, flying F-11F's.

In 1976, the show was moved from May to September.

In 1995, the Airshow was designated the largest Airshow on the East Coast.

The 2001 Airshow was cancelled due to security reasons, due to the September 11 terrorist attacks.

The 2020 and 2021 Airshows were cancelled to the coronavirus (COVID-19) pandemic. This was the first time the show had been cancelled since 2001.

== Performers ==
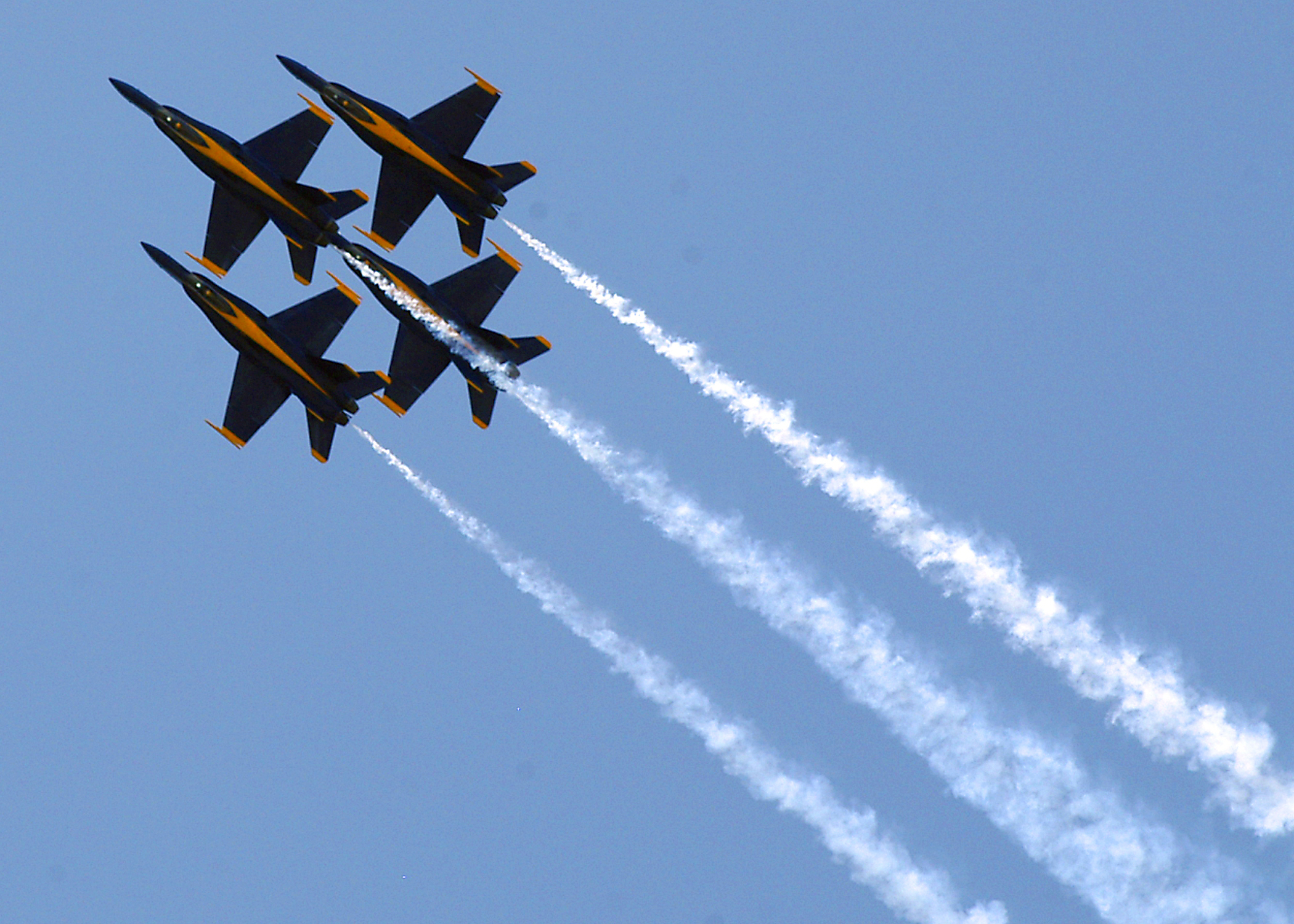
The Blue Angels in formation at the 2007 Airshow

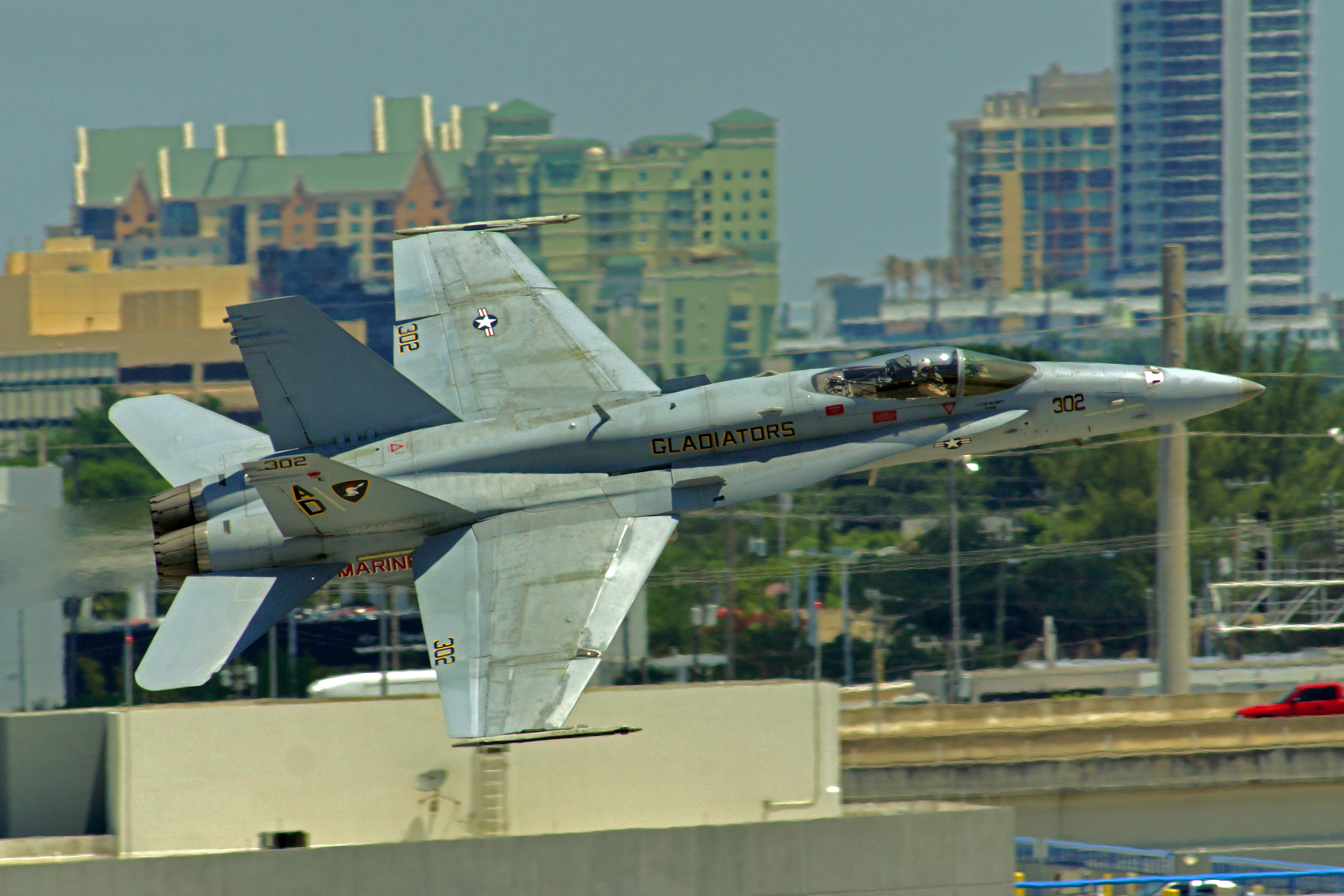
An F/A-18C participating in the Airshow

The following is a list of performers from the 2024 Airshow:

Aircraft:

- MH-53 Flyover
- Air Power Demonstration
- Fleet Flyby
- F-22 Raptor Demonstration Team
- F/A-18 Rhino Demonstration Team
- F-35C Lightning II Demonstration Team
- CF-18 Demonstration Team
- Warbird Thunder
- Navy Corsair Legacy Flight
- Canadian Air Division CF-18 Demonstration Team
- U.S. Navy Blue Angels

Cars:

- Smoke and Thunder Jet Dragster

Groups:

- U.S. Navy EOD Jump Team
- U.S. Navy parachute team, the Leap Frogs
- Virginia Patriot Guard Riders
- Skydive Suffolk Demonstration Team

People:

- Aarron Deliu
- Michael Goulian
- Wayne Boggs

Other:

- World's Largest Rubber Duck.

== Attendance ==
Each year, the Airshow receives around 300,000 visitors. Around 6,000 of these were students from elementary schools in the area. The 2023 Airshow was also streamed live in over 58 countries, garnering just under 900,000 impressions.
