= VFA-131 =

Strike Fighter Squadron 131
- Active: 3 October 1983 – present
- Country: United States
- Branch: United States Navy
- Type: Fighter/Attack
- Role: Close air support Air interdiction Aerial reconnaissance
- Part of: Carrier Air Wing 7
- Garrison/HQ: NAS Oceana
- Nickname: "Wildcats"
- Mottos: "Airlant's First and Finest"
- Colors: Red, white, blue
- Engagements: Operation Prairie Fire; Operation El Dorado Canyon; Gulf War; Operation Deny Flight; Operation Southern Watch; Operation Decisive Endeavor; Iraq War; Operation Enduring Freedom; Operation Inherent Resolve; Operation Prosperity Guardian; 2024 missile strikes in Yemen; Operation Poseidon Archer; Operation Epic Fury

Aircraft flown
- Fighter: F/A-18 Hornet; F/A-18E Super Hornet

Strike Fighter Squadron 131 (VFA-131), also known as the "Wildcats", is a United States Navy F/A-18E Super Hornet fighter squadron stationed at Naval Air Station Oceana. Their radio call sign is "Wildcat" and their aircraft tail code is AG.

== History ==
=== 1980s ===
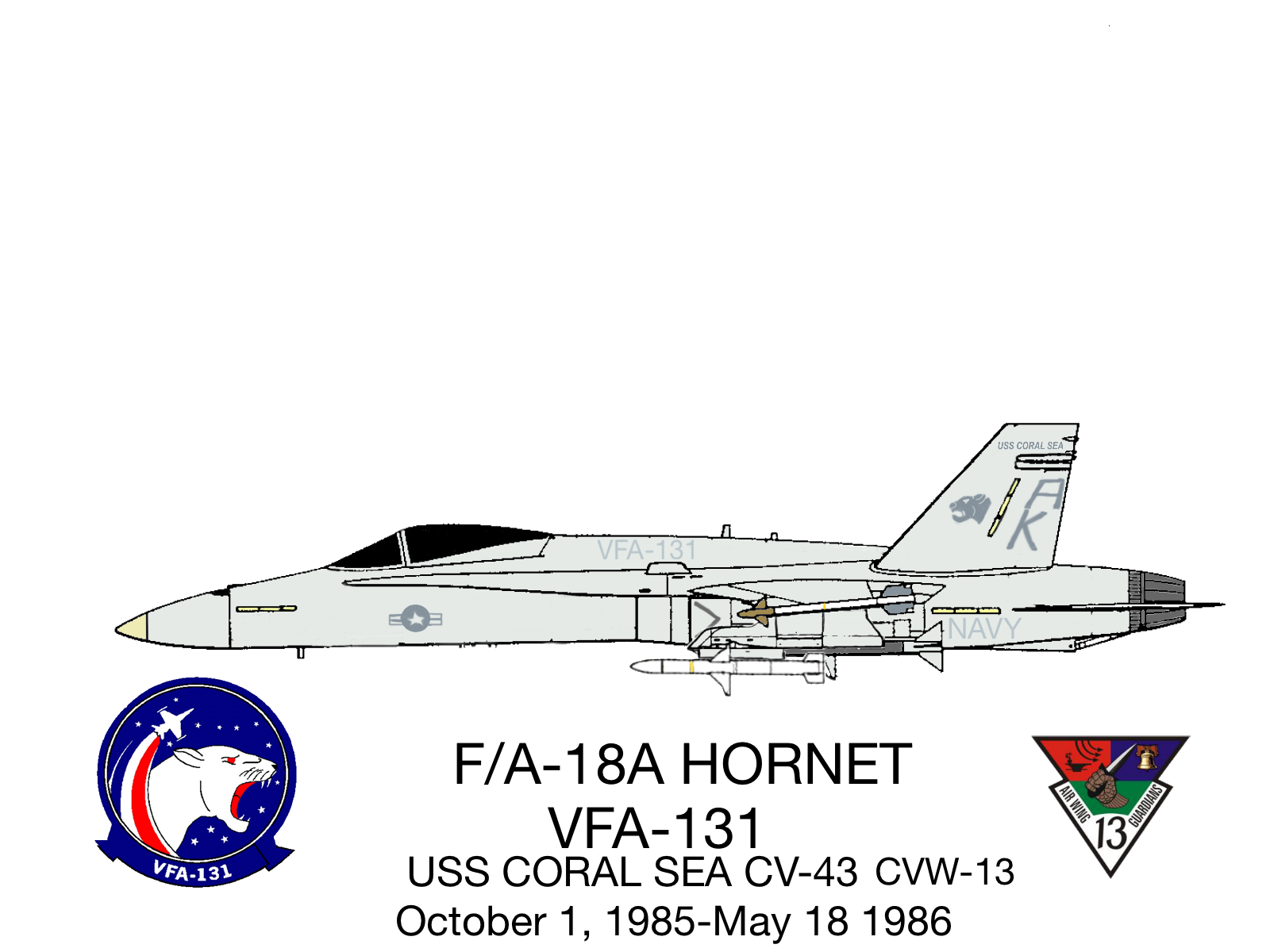
F/A-18A Hornet VFA-131 CVW-13 USS Coral Sea CV-43 October 1, 1985-May 18, 1986

VFA-131 was established at Naval Air Station Lemoore, California, on 3 October 1983, and trained in the F/A-18 Hornet under VFA-125. The squadron received their first F/A-18A in May 1984. In January 1985, the squadron moved to Naval Air Station Cecil Field, Florida, becoming the Atlantic Fleet’s first F/A-18 squadron.

In March 1986 during Freedom of Navigation exercises in the Gulf of Sidra, the squadron’s aircraft flew Combat Air Patrols during which a Libyan SA-5 Gammon missile was fired against an American aircraft operating in international waters. On 14–15 April 1986, squadron aircraft participated in Operation El Dorado Canyon, along with other units of CVW-13 and A-7s from CVW-1, providing air-to-surface Shrike and HARM strikes against Libyan surface-to-air missile sites at Benghazi. This was the first use of the F/A-18 in combat.

From 15 October 1987 to 12 Apr 1988 the squadron joined Carrier Air Wing Thirteen (CVW-13) and deployed to the Mediterranean Sea aboard USS Coral Sea

VFA-131 embarked on USS Independence from 15 August – 8 October 1988 for the carrier's transit from Philadelphia Naval Shipyard to its new home port at NAS North Island via Cape Horn.

=== 1990s ===
In August 1990 while embarked on USS Dwight D. Eisenhower, squadron F/A-18s flew missions in the Red Sea in support of Operation Desert Shield, the build-up of American and Allied forces to counter a threatened invasion of Saudi Arabia by Iraq and as part of an economic blockade of Iraq to force its withdrawal from Kuwait. The Eisenhower task force was the first U.S. force in position to deter Iraqi incursion into Saudi Arabia.

Upon return from deployment in September 1990, the squadron transitioned to F/A-18C Lot XIII Night Strike Hornets. One year later, the squadron again deployed aboard USS Dwight D. Eisenhower to the Red Sea and North Persian Gulf in support of Operation Desert Storm.

In May 1994, the squadron was part of the maiden deployment of USS George Washington. They flew sorties in support of Operation Deny Flight over Bosnia-Herzegovina and Operation Southern Watch over southern Iraq. In October 1994, they returned to the Persian Gulf and participated in Operation Vigilant Warrior, in response to Iraqi aggression.

In January 1996 the squadron once again deployed aboard USS George Washington to the Mediterranean, Adriatic Sea, and the Persian Gulf in support of Operation Decisive Endeavor and Operation Southern Watch. In February 1998, the squadron deployed for the "Around the World", maiden deployment of USS John C. Stennis, again supporting Operation Southern Watch in Iraq. Upon return to the United States in December 1998, they relocated from NAS Cecil Field, Florida, to NAS Oceana, Virginia.

=== 2000s ===
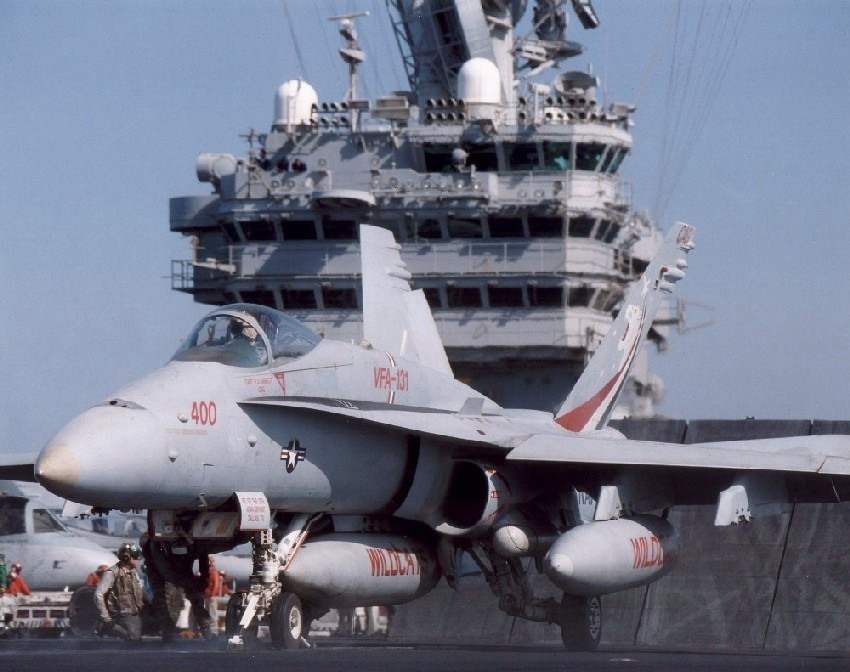
VFA-131 F/A-18C preparing to launch, c. 2006

On 11 September 2001, the squadron was underway aboard USS John F. Kennedy off the Virginia Capes. Within hours of the September 11 attacks, armed squadron Hornets were conducting air patrols over Washington, D.C., and New York City as part of Operation Noble Eagle. In February 2002, the squadron deployed to the North Arabian Sea to take part in Operation Enduring Freedom (OEF), flying combat sorties over Afghanistan.

From January to July 2004, VFA-131 deployed aboard USS George Washington in support of Operation Iraqi Freedom. The squadron deployed from October 2006 to June 2007 aboard USS Dwight D. Eisenhower in support of OIF, OEF, and operations in Somalia.

=== 2010s ===
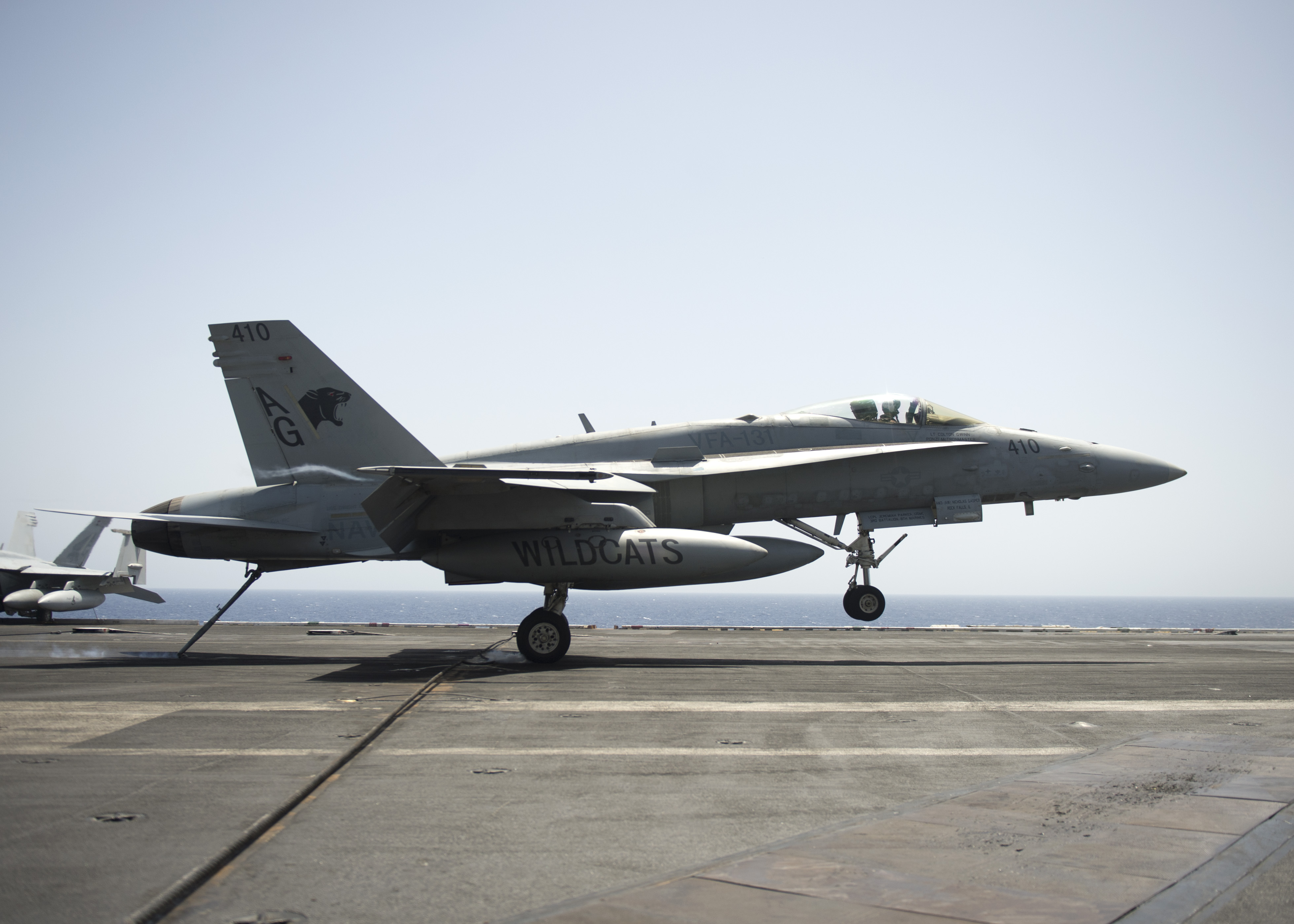
A VFA-131 Hornet landing aboard the Dwight D. Eisenhower in the Red Sea, June 2013

Between June and December 2016 the squadron deployed aboard USS Dwight D. Eisenhower with Carrier Air Wing Three in support of Operation Inherent Resolve, flying combat missions in Iraq and Syria. On 22 September 2017, VFA-131 flew the F/A-18C Hornet for the last time at NAS Oceana, before transitioning to the F/A-18E Super Hornet, a process that at the time was expected to finish by 2019.

=== 2020s ===
From January to August 2020 VFA-131 was embarked on board USS Dwight D Eisenhower (CVN-69) in support of Operation Freedom’s Sentinel. VFA-131 flew combat missions into Afghanistan, provide armed overwatch for Strait of Hormuz transits, and conducted other missions in the 5th Fleet AOR. With the ongoing COVID-19 pandemic, VFA-131 remained embarked for the duration of the deployment.

Beginning in December 2023, VFA-131 has taken part in Operation Prosperity Guardian, conducting air-to-ground strikes within Yemen and engaging Houthi Unmanned Aerial Vehicles

In December 2024, the Wildcats were transferred back to Carrier Air Wing 7, but in a different position than they were in previously.

In late April 2026, VFA-131 as part of CVW 7 onboard the George H. W. Bush entered the CENTCOM AOR. VFA-131’s F/A-18Es began combat operations against Iran and undertook naval blockade sorties within Operation Epic Fury.

== Squadron Insignia and Nickname ==
The squadron’s insignia, featuring the head of a wildcat, was approved by Chief of Naval Operations on 26 January 1984.

== See also ==
- List of United States Navy aircraft squadrons
