= Naval Air Station Oceana =

United States Navy airport in Virginia

- Apollo Soucek Field
- Virginia Beach, Virginia in the United States
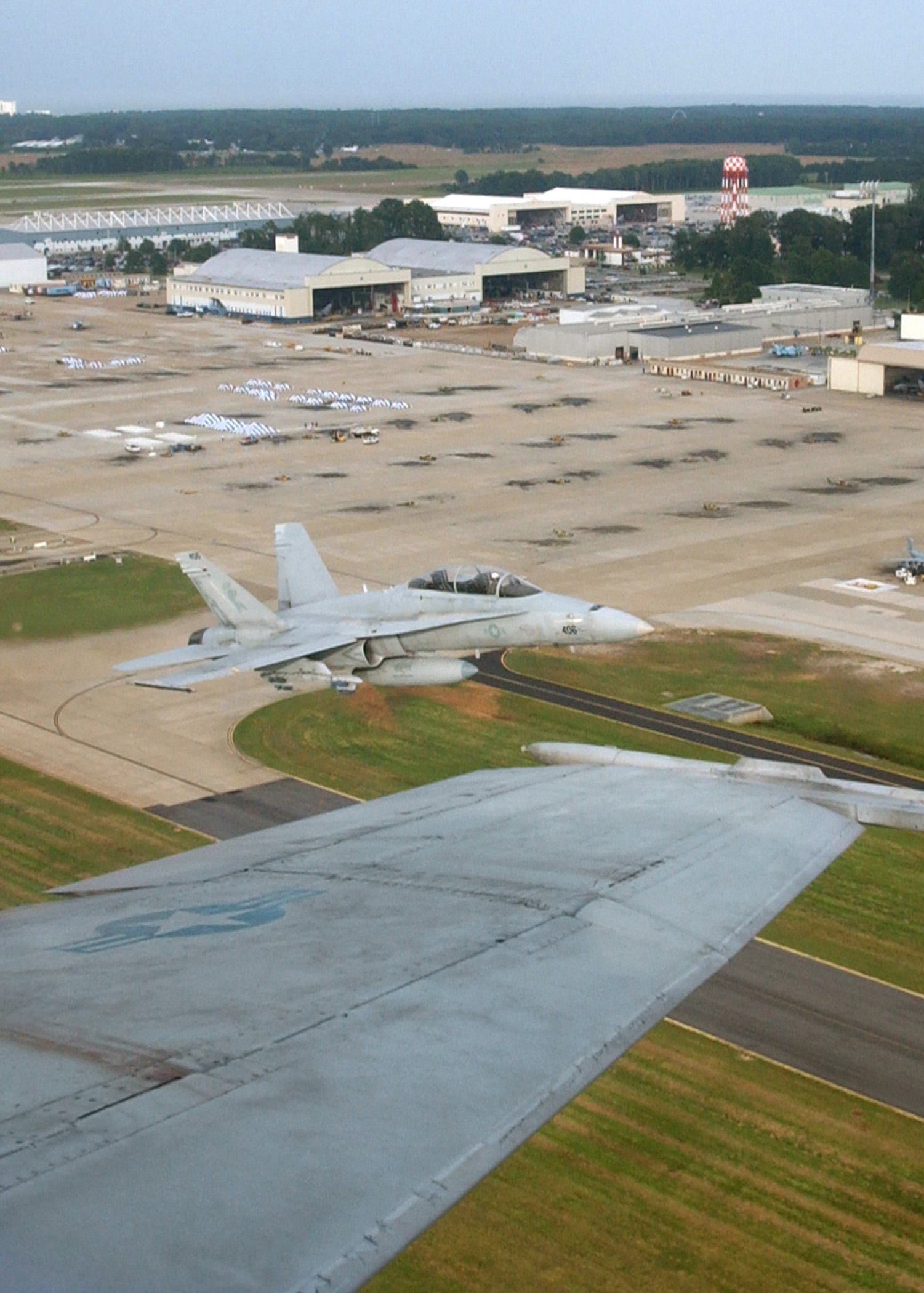
- F/A-18D Hornets of VFA-106 perform a section take-off from NAS Oceana in 2003.

Site information
- Type: Naval Air Station (Master jet base)
- Owner: Department of Defense
- Operator: US Navy
- Controlled by: Navy Region Mid-Atlantic
- Condition: Operational
- Website: Official website

Location
- Location in the United States NAS Oceana (Virginia)
- Coordinates: 36°49′14″N 76°02′00″W

Site history
- Built: 1941 – 1943
- In use: 1943 – present

Garrison information
- Current commander: Captain Rob Littman
- Garrison: Strike Fighter Wing Atlantic

Airfield information
- Identifiers: IATA: NTU, ICAO: KNTU, FAA LID: NTU, WMO: 723075
- Elevation: 6.7 metres (22 ft) AMSL
Runways
| Direction | Length and surface |
|---|---|
| 5R/23L | 3,660 metres (12,008 ft) asphalt/concrete |
| 5L/23R | 2,438.4 metres (8,000 ft) asphalt/concrete |
| 14R/32L | 2,438.4 metres (8,000 ft) asphalt/concrete |
| 14L/32R | 2,438.4 metres (8,000 ft) asphalt/concrete |

Naval Air Station (NAS) Oceana or NAS Oceana (IATA: NTU, ICAO: KNTU, FAA LID: NTU) is a United States Navy Naval Air Station located in Virginia Beach, Virginia. It is the Navy's East Coast master jet base and the headquarters of Commander, Strike Fighter Wing Atlantic.

The station occupies approximately 5,916 acres (23.9 km²) and is home to more than 300 aircraft. its buildings are valued at more than $800 million in plant replacement value. The NAS Oceana installation complex, including Dam Neck Annex and Naval Auxiliary Landing Field Fentress, has approximately 10,500 active-duty Navy personnel, 10,000 family members and 4,500 civilian personnel.

The base is under the jurisdiction of Navy Region Mid-Atlantic and is the headquarters of Strike Fighter Wing Atlantic and Carrier Air Wings 1, 3, 7 and 8. As home to all East Coast strike fighter jet squadrons, the Naval Air Station is classified as a master jet base.

The airfield is officially known as Apollo Soucek Field. It was named in 1957 for Vice Admiral Appolla Soucek, a naval aviator and test pilot who held the world altitude record, and later served as Chief of the Navy's Bureau of Aeronautics.

Constructed in 1941, and officially commissioned in 1943, NAS Oceana has been home to carrier-based aircraft since its inception. The field serves as home for 14 deployable Strike Fighter squadrons operating the F/A-18E/F Super Hornet, a Strike Fighter Fleet Replacement Squadron, an adversary squadron, and a logistics squadron. Additionally, NAS Oceana operates Dam Neck Annex, a separate military installation that is home to other non-flying commands, including various school houses, and Naval Auxiliary Landing Field Fentress, a practice carrier landing field, in nearby Chesapeake, Virginia. The air station is not open to the public except one weekend each year, usually in September, when it hosts the NAS Oceana Air Show.

== History ==
In November 1940, the U.S. Government acquired the land (around 1.1 km^{2}) that would eventually become Naval Air Station Oceana. At that time, the surrounding area was mainly farmland susceptible to flooding, but it served as a useful outlying field for the rapidly expanding naval air force headquartered at NAS Norfolk and allowed units to work up for deployments away from the crowded base there. At first the US Government constructed a small airfield with 32 officers and 172 enlisted men. Construction of asphalt runways began on December 31, 1940, and was completed in November 1941.

In 1943, the United States Congress approved a project for the expansion of the station to accommodate up to 160 officers and 800 enlisted personnel, and to provide longer runways The installation was redesignated "Naval Auxiliary Air Station". On April 1, 1952, it was redesignated Naval air station Oceana. The Chief of Naval Operations approved Oceana as an all-weather air station in 1954 as jet operations at the installation expanded.

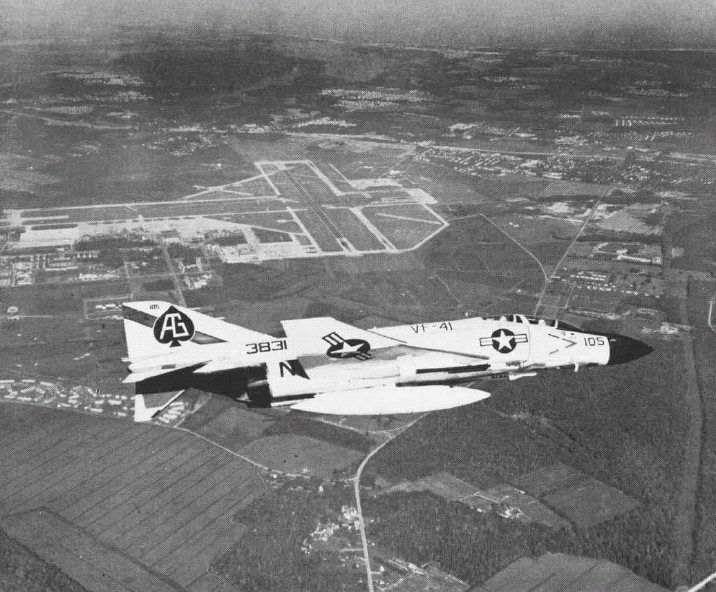
A VF-41 F-4J over NAS Oceana in the late 1960s

Under the Navy's Master Jet Base concept, all Type/Model/Series (T/M/S) aircraft were home-based at one field with associated intermediate maintenance and training facilities. In the 1960s, NAS Oceana became the home to all East Coast based F-4 Phantom II squadrons. Fighter Squadron 101 (VF-101) established a detachment at NAS Oceana in its role as the Fleet Readiness Squadron (FRS), formerly known as the Replacement Air Group or "RAG", that trained aircrews and maintainers to operate the Phantom (at the time, VF-101 operated out of NAS Key West, Florida). Grumman F-14 Tomcats were assigned to NAS Oceana in 1974. In 1976, VF-101 established its F-14 replacement Air Group to train Tomcat Aircrews and maintainers. Phantom Training subsequently shifted to VF-171 until the f-4 was retired from Navy service in 1984. The Navy retired the f-14 at NAS Oceana on September 22, 2006. At one time, in addition to fighter aircraft, all of the Atlantic Fleet's A-6 Intruder medium attack squadrons were also home-based at NAS Oceana, along with VA-42 as the associated Fleet Readiness Squadron charged with training all East Coast A-6 pilots, bombardier/navigators and A-6 maintenance personnel. The A-6E was retired from the Fleet in 1997.

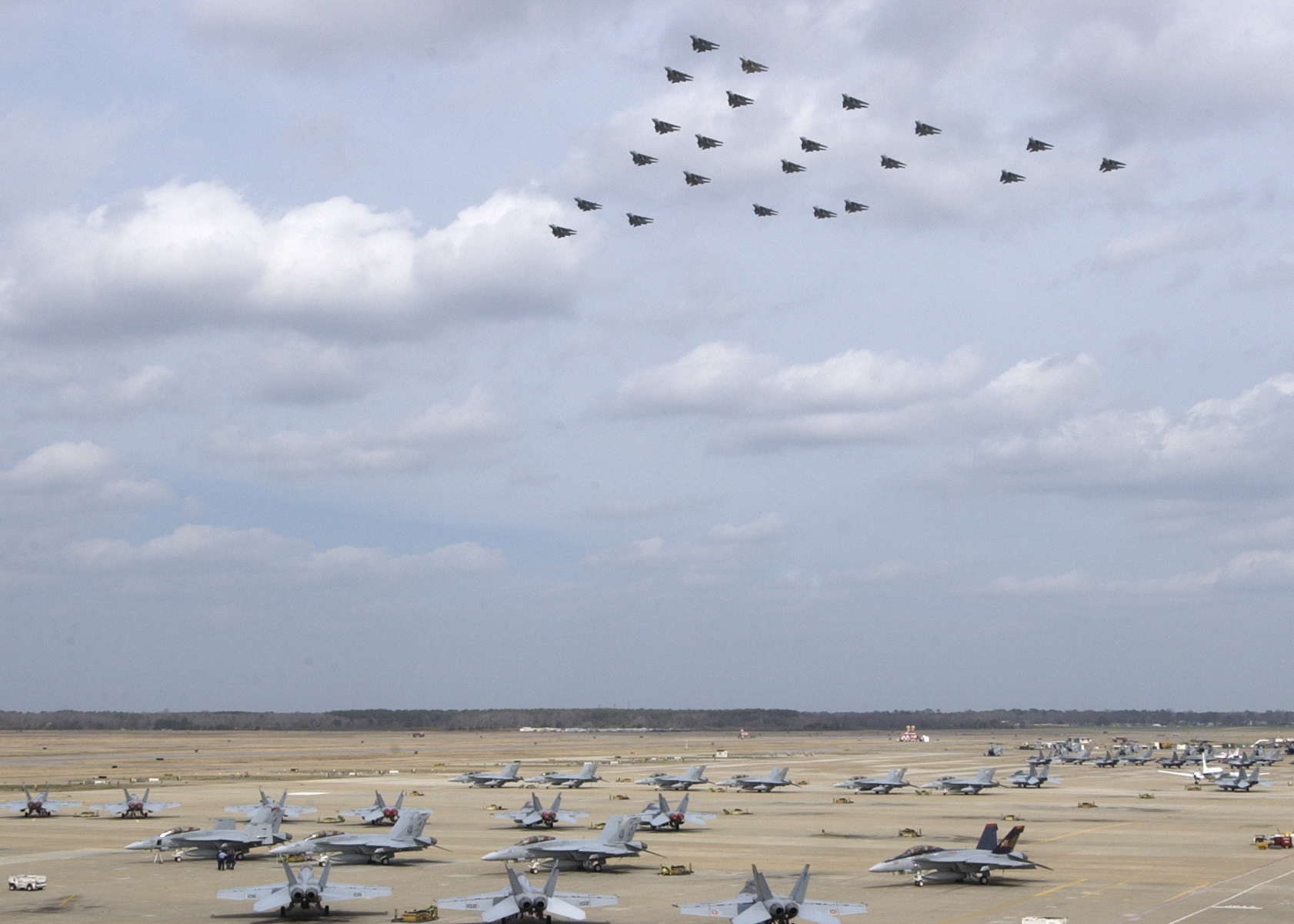
VF-213 & VF-31 conduct a flyover of NAS Oceana after returning from the Tomcat's final deployment.

NAS Oceana become home to McDonnell Douglas F/A-18 Hornet squadrons transferred from Naval Air Station Cecil Field, Florida. during 1998 and 1999 as part of the Base Realignment and Closure process.

NAS Oceana was included among the Space Shuttle programs East Coast launch-abort landing sites.

On April 6, 2012, an F/A-18D assigned to VFA-106 took off from NAS Oceana, encountered dual engine failure and crashed into an apartment complex in Virginia Beach, Virginia. Both pilots ejected safely, and there were no fatalities.

On October 2, 2019, the Navy's final active-duty McDonnell Douglas F/A-18 Hornet made its last operational flight from NAS Oceana. The F/A-18A and F/A-18C had been replaced in active Navy service by the Boeing F/A-18E/F Super Hornet.

== Current operations ==
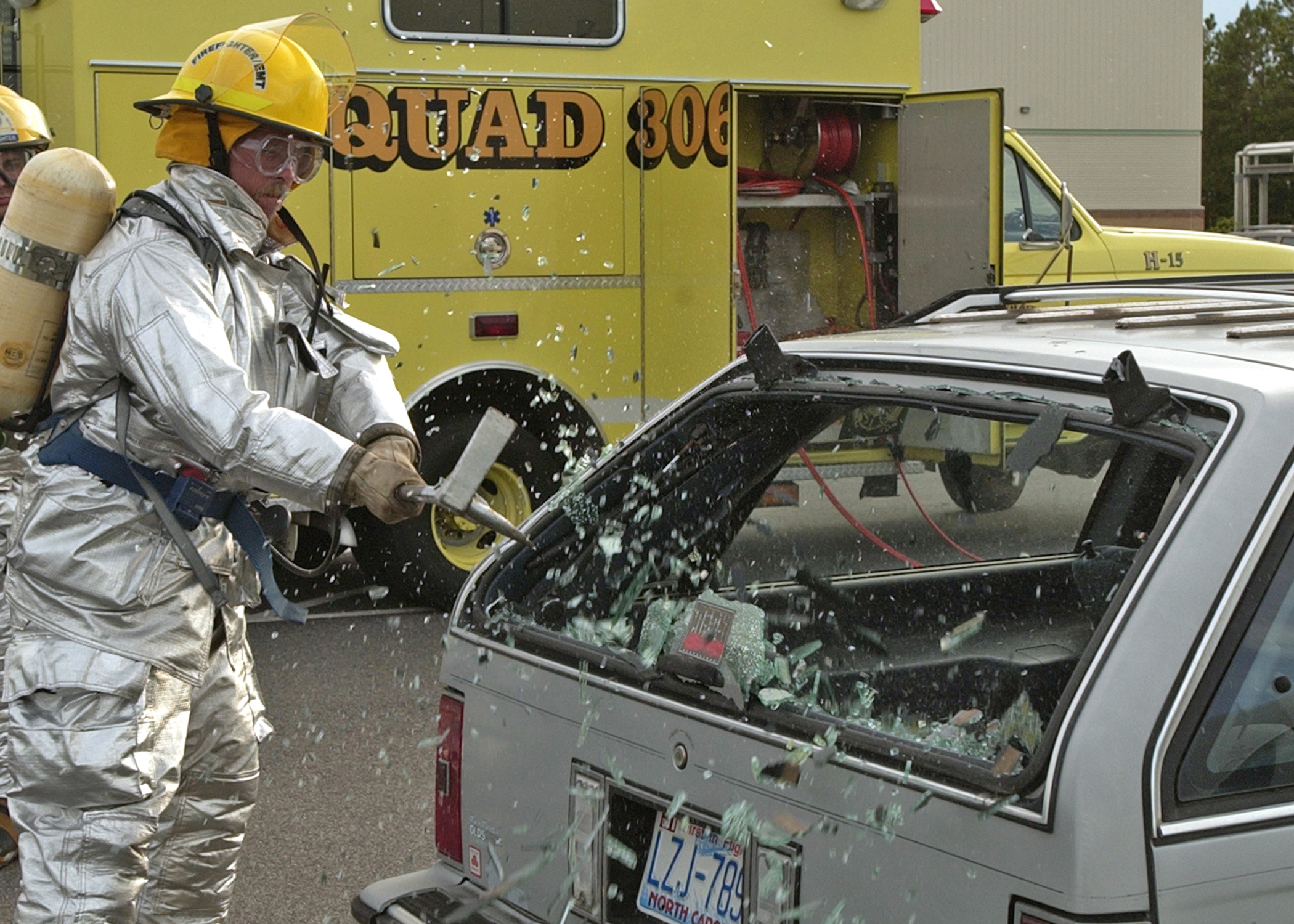
A mass casualties drill was conducted aboard Naval Air Station Oceana during training exercises. Firefighter/EMT Greg Tetro breaks the rear glass of an automobile to rescue a trapped victim.

NAS Oceana is headquarters to Strike Fighter Wing Atlantic, the Navy's largest type wing. The command comprises 16 squadrons and more than 8,500 military and civilian personnel and is responsible for manning, training and equipping Atlantic Fleet strike fighter squadrons.

Apollo Soucel Field is home to 17 aviation squadrons. Sixteen operate Boeing F/A-18E/F Super Hornets, while Fleet Logistics Support Squadron 56 (VR-56) operates the Boeing C-40 Clipper. Strike Fighter Squadron 106 (VFA-106) serves as the East Coast fleet replacement squadron, and Fighter Squadron Composite 12 (VFC-12) provides adversary training.

Tomcat training was conducted by VF-101 Grim Reapers. NAS Oceana was host to the "Tomcat Sunset" reunion from 21 to 23 September 2006, where over 3000 former and current aircrew and maintainers came together to celebrate the retirement of the F-14 from active Fleet service. NAS Oceana also was the location where the F-14 took off for the last time for the final flight of the type when F-14D, Bureau Number (BuNo) 164603, Modex 101, of Fighter Squadron 31 (VF-31) was ferried from NAS Oceana to Republic Airport in East Farmingdale on Long Island, NY for permanent static display at the Northrop Grumman facilities where the Tomcat was originally built.

During the 2005 round of BRAC base closures, it was decided that NAS Oceana could remain open only if certain conditions were met. The most contentious of these requirements was that the city of Virginia Beach buy and condemn approximately 3,400 residences and an unknown number of businesses in crash zones surrounding the base. The BRAC commission proposed moving the fighters to Cecil Field, a recently deactivated naval air station located near Jacksonville, Florida if NAS Oceana was not able to meet that and several other conditions. The plan was initially met with optimism by Jacksonville Mayor John Peyton, even though Cecil Field had already been converted into a joint civil-military airport with helicopter operations by the U.S. Coast Guard and the Florida Army National Guard and an associated commerce park dominated by major aerospace firms such as Northrop Grumman and Boeing performing major maintenance and overhaul work on a variety of military jet aircraft. The senior Navy leadership ultimately expressed disinterest in moving the Master Jet Base back to the Jacksonville area, having only deactivated Cecil Field less than six years earlier and moving all its Atlantic Fleet F/A-18 squadrons from the former NAS Cecil Field to NAS Oceana. In October 2005, the city of Jacksonville removed itself from the process.

On December 20, 2005 the Virginia Beach City Council passed numerous ordinances enacted to satisfy BRAC, but did not act to condemn any of the homes in the designated areas. In a November 2006 referendum, citizens of Jacksonville voted to leave the Cecil Field Airport and Commerce Center in civilian hands under the Jacksonville Aviation Authority, effectively halting any future plans of relocation.

In addition to the squadrons listed, there are numerous other commands present as "tenant" commands at Oceana:

- Fleet Readiness Center Mid-Atlantic, formerly known as Aviation Intermediate Maintenance Department (AIMD) Oceana. One of six centers for naval aviation maintenance, FRC provides Intermediate and Depot level maintenance support to the tenant squadrons and SeaOpDet technicians to aircraft carriers home-ported on the East Coast.
- Strike Fighter Wing Atlantic, the command that serves as "Commodore" of all east coast Hornet and Super Hornet squadrons when not forward deployed with their respective carrier air wings.
- Strike Fighter Weapons School Atlantic (SFWSL) a Type Weapons School staffed by Strike Fighter Weapons & Tactics (SFWTI) instructors where F/A-18 aircrews go for "graduate level" training in air-to-ground ordnance delivery and air-to-air tactics.
- Landing Signal Officer School (LSO School), where pilots selected to be LSOs (also known as "paddles"...which is a very old term from the days when the LSO actually signaled to the approaching aircraft with brightly colored paddles) go to learn how to "wave" planes aboard the "boat" (aircrew speak for the aircraft carrier).
- CVW commands, or Carrier Air Wing Commanders (also called CAG, which is an old term derived from the previous name for these commands, Carrier Air Groups), which are responsible for all squadrons in an air wing when actually on board a carrier or when preparing for overseas deployment. Carrier Air Wings One, Three, Seven, and Eight maintain headquarters at NAS Oceana.
- Strike Fighter Composite Squadron 12 (VFC-12), a Navy Reserve F/A-18A+ Hornet squadron that provides adversary/aggressor training services to Atlantic Fleet strike fighter squadrons.
- Fleet Logistics Support Squadron 56 (VR-56), a Navy Reserve C-40 squadron that provides worldwide operational support airlift for deployable U.S. Navy Fleet units and shore establishment commands.
- Fleet Area Control and Surveillance Facility Virginia Capes (FACSFAC VACAPES, call sign GIANT KILLER), which is responsible for surveillance, management and sea and air traffic control of the Virginia Capes warning areas for training purposes, as well as surveillance duties in support of Homeland Defense.
- Construction Battalion Unit 415 (CBU 415), a Navy Seabee Battalion.
- Center for Naval Aviation Technical Training Unit Oceana (CNATTU Oceana), which trains Navy and Marine Corps aircraft maintainers on the F/A-18 and operates both A and C schools.
- Marine Aviation Training Support Group 33, a United States Marine Corps training administration command, primarily supporting USMC aviation student and instructor staff personnel assigned to the F/A-18 Fleet Readiness Squadron, VFA-106.
- A branch Medical and Dental clinic under the command of Naval Medical Center Portsmouth, VA.

== Outlying field controversy ==
Plans by the Navy to construct a naval outlying landing field supporting both NAS Oceana and MCAS Cherry Point in eastern North Carolina, initiated in 2006, met with fierce opposition by local residents and environmentalists. Concerns about the ecological impacts of the field, along with noise concerns voiced by residents, led to the abandonment of the initially planned sites for the OLF, along with a delay in the project's environmental impact statement.

In early 2011, the U.S. Navy announced it was suspending plans for the construction of the outlying landing field until at least 2014. In November 2013, the U.S. Navy announced it was cancelling plans for a Navy OLF in North Carolina.

== Tenant Commands ==
=== Carrier-Air-Wings List ===
Strike Fighter Wing Atlantic

- Carrier Air Wing 1 (CVW-1), assigned to: USS Harry S. Truman (CVN-75)
- Carrier Air Wing 3 (CVW-3), assigned to: USS Dwight D. Eisenhower (CVN-69)
- Carrier Air Wing 7 (CVW-7), assigned to: USS George H.W. Bush (CVN-77)
- Carrier Air Wing 8 (CVW-8), assigned to: USS Gerald R. Ford (CVN-78)

== Aviation squadrons ==
| Insignia | Squadron | Code | Callsign/Nickname | Assigned Aircraft | Operational Assignment |
|---|---|---|---|---|---|
| | Strike Fighter Squadron 11 | VFA-11 | Red Rippers | F/A-18F Super Hornet | Carrier Air Wing One |
| | Fighter Squadron Composite 12 | VFC-12 | Fighting Omars | F/A-18E/F Super Hornet | Tactical Support Wing (TSW) |
| | Strike Fighter Squadron 31 | VFA-31 | Tomcatters | F/A-18E Super Hornet | Carrier Air Wing Eight |
| | Strike Fighter Squadron 32 | VFA-32 | Fighting Swordsmen | F/A-18F Super Hornet | Carrier Air Wing Three |
| | Strike Fighter Squadron 34 | VFA-34 | Blue Blasters | F/A-18E Super Hornet | Carrier Air Wing Three |
| | Strike Fighter Squadron 37 | VFA-37 | Ragin' Bulls | F/A-18E Super Hornet | Carrier Air Wing Eight |
| | Strike Fighter Squadron 81 | VFA-81 | Sunliners | F/A-18E Super Hornet | Carrier Air Wing One |
| | Strike Fighter Squadron 83 | VFA-83 | Rampagers | F/A-18E Super Hornet | Carrier Air Wing Seven |
| | Strike Fighter Squadron 87 | VFA-87 | Golden Warriors | F/A-18E Super Hornet | Carrier Air Wing Eight |
| | Strike Fighter Squadron 103 | VFA-103 | Jolly Rogers | F/A-18F Super Hornet | Carrier Air Wing Seven |
| | Strike Fighter Squadron 105 | VFA-105 | Gunslingers | F/A-18E Super Hornet | Carrier Air Wing Seven |
| | Strike Fighter Squadron 106 | VFA-106 | Gladiators | F/A-18E/F Super Hornet | Fleet Replacement Squadron (FRS) |
| | Strike Fighter Squadron 131 | VFA-131 | Wildcats | F/A-18E Super Hornet | Carrier Air Wing Seven |
| | Strike Fighter Squadron 143 | VFA-143 | Pukin' Dogs | F/A-18E Super Hornet | Carrier Air Wing One |
| | Strike Fighter Squadron 211 | VFA-211 | Checkmates | F/A-18E Super Hornet | Carrier Air Wing Eleven |
| | Strike Fighter Squadron 213 | VFA-213 | Black Lions | F/A-18F Super Hornet | Carrier Air Wing Eight |
| | Fleet Logistics Support Squadron 56 | VR-56 | Globemasters | C-40 Clipper | Fleet Logistics Support Wing |
| | Naval Special Warfare Development Group | DEVGRU | SEAL Team Six | | Joint Special Operations Command (JSOC) |

== Environment ==
In mid-May 2017, 94,000 US gallons (360,000 L) of jet fuel spilled from a storage tank, and also spread onto adjoining properties and waterways, notably Wolfsnare Creek. The installation worked closely with local communities to assist with emergency relocation and issuing water. Fishermen were warned to refrain from fishing, crabbing and other recreational activities in the area. Affected wildlife was identified and helped as part of the cleanup.

== See also ==
- Skytypers Air Show Team (fatal accident September 7, 2007)
- List of United States Navy airfields
