= VFA-105 =

United States Navy aviation squadron based at NAS Oceana, Virginia, USA

Strike Fighter Squadron 105
- Active: 1 November 1967 - present
- Country: United States
- Branch: United States Navy
- Type: Fighter/Attack
- Role: Close air support Air interdiction Aerial reconnaissance
- Part of: Carrier Air Wing Seven
- Garrison/HQ: NAS Oceana
- Nickname: "Gunslingers"
- Motto: "Tonight... we ride!"
- Colors: Green, gray, yellow, black
- Engagements: Vietnam War; Operation Southern Watch; Operation Desert Fox; Iraq War; Operation Enduring Freedom; Operation Inherent Resolve; Operation Prosperity Guardian; 2024 missile strikes in Yemen; Operation Poseidon Archer; Operation Epic Fury

Commanders
- Commanding Officer: CDR Paul Dixon
- Executive Officer: CDR Joel "FAIDS" Nogle
- Command Master Chief: CMDCM (SW/AW) Antonnette G. Spruill

Aircraft flown
- Attack: A-7 Corsair II
- Fighter: F/A-18C Hornet; F/A-18E Super Hornet; F/A-18F Super Hornet

Strike Fighter Squadron 105 (VFA-105) also known as the "Gunslingers" is a United States Navy strike fighter squadron based at Naval Air Station Oceana, Virginia. The "Gunslingers" are an operational fleet squadron and fly the F/A-18E/F Super Hornet. Their radio callsign is "Canyon" and the tail code is AG.

== Squadron Insignia and Nickname ==
VA-105's insignia was approved by the Chief of Naval Operations (CNO) on 20 September 1968, and has remained essentially unchanged. It features an Old West gun belt and six-shooter resembling that worn by the main character in the television series Have Gun – Will Travel, with a gold knight chess piece emblazoned on the holster.

The squadron gained the nickname "105th Light Attack and Twilight Pursuit Squadron" during the Vietnam War. "Twilight Pursuit" was a tongue-in-cheek reference to the fact that squadron aircraft carried the air-air AIM-9 Sidewinder missile. The nickname became somewhat more formally accepted in the months leading up to the 1974-75 Mediterranean Cruise. Appearing on squadron patches, belt buckles, (stickers and lighters) proudly worn by officers and enlisted men alike, the moniker was heavily promoted by the squadron's pilots. The current squadron often refers to itself as the "105th Strike Fighter and Twilight Pursuit Squadron".

== History ==
Two distinct squadrons have been designated VA-105. The first VA-105 was established on 1 May 1952 and disestablished on 1 February 1959, and the second was later redesignated as VFA-105, the main subject of this article. Officially, the US Navy does not recognize a direct lineage with disestablished squadrons if a new squadron is formed with the same designation. Often, the new squadron will assume the nickname, insignia, and traditions of the earlier squadrons.

=== 1960s ===
Attack Squadron 105 (VA-105) was established on 1 November 1967 at NAS Cecil Field, flying the new A-7A Corsair II. On 4 March 1968 the squadron completed A-7A training under VA-174 and became an operational Atlantic Fleet unit.

The squadron embarked on their first deployment to Southeast Asia aboard USS Kitty Hawk, participating in combat operations in the Gulf of Tonkin from January to October 1969. Following the shootdown of a Navy EC-121 by the North Koreans in April, Kitty Hawk was part of a continuing American presence being maintained off the coast of Korea.

=== 1970s ===
In September and October 1970 following the hijacking of several airliners by Palestinians, the outbreak of serious fighting in Jordan and the invasion of Jordan by Syria, USS Saratoga, with VA-105 embarked, operated in the eastern Mediterranean, prepared to support an evacuation of Americans from Jordan and to show support for the Jordanian government.

From June–December 1972, the squadron participated in Operation Linebacker and Operation Linebacker II, heavy air strikes against targets in North Vietnam to interdict the flow of supplies into South Vietnam.

In May 1973, the squadron upgraded to the A-7E.

As of December 1979 the squadron had two Western Pacific and six Mediterranean deployments to their credit.

=== 1980s ===
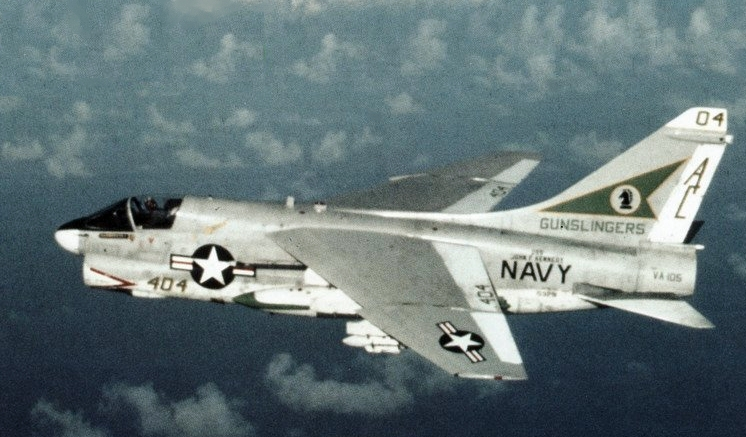
VA-105 A-7E Corsair II in 1982

In June 1982 following the Israeli invasion of Lebanon, VA-105 operated from USS John F. Kennedy to support an evacuation of Americans.

From July–December 1984, the squadron deployed to MCAS Iwakuni, assigned to MAG-12, 1st MAW. This was the first time a Navy squadron participated in the United States Marine Corps Unit Deployment Program (UDP) and the first Navy squadron since World War II to come under the command of a Marine Corps officer. While deployed with the Marines the squadron's major mission was close air support.

During the 1980s, the squadron completed eight overseas deployments, including six to the Mediterranean, and a 1983 around-the-world cruise aboard USS Carl Vinson during her maiden voyage.

=== 1990s ===
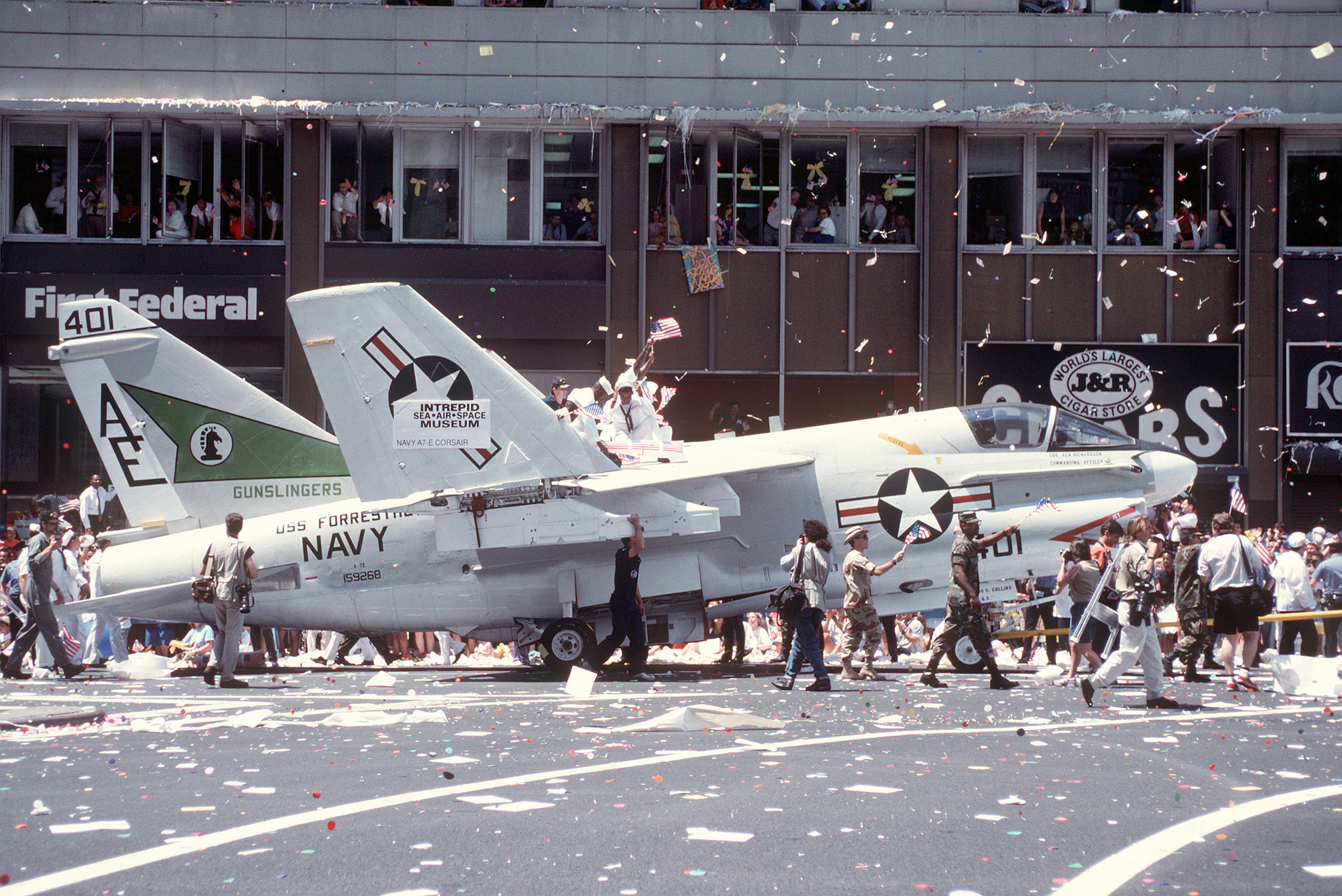
A retired A-7E Corsair II aircraft from the Squadron in a Welcome Home parade after the Gulf War in 1991

VA-105 was redesignated Strike Fighter Squadron 105 (VFA-105) on 17 December 1990, as the squadron transitioned to the F/A-18C Hornet. The squadron reported to Carrier Air Wing Three (CVW-3) aboard USS John F. Kennedy on 1 September 1991. VFA-105 made their first Hornet cruise in October 1992. They returned from the Mediterranean in April 1993, and began workups for a deployment aboard USS Dwight D. Eisenhower in October 1994. The squadron then started workups for a deployment aboard USS Theodore Roosevelt in October 1996. VFA-105 and the rest of CVW-3 deployed in 1998 in support of Operation Southern Watch and Operation Desert Fox on board USS Enterprise.

=== 2000s ===
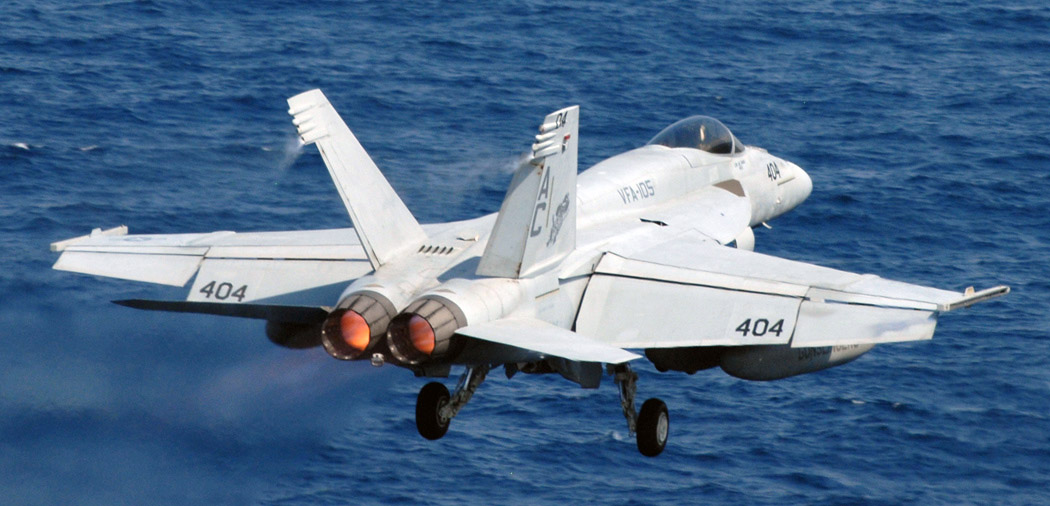
VFA-105 F/A-18E launching from USS Harry S. Truman in 2007

On 28 November 2000, VFA-105 embarked on the maiden deployment of USS Harry S. Truman to the Mediterranean and Persian Gulf in support of Operation Southern Watch (OSW). The Gunslingers deployed in support of Operation Iraqi Freedom aboard Harry S. Truman in 2003, operating from the Mediterranean Sea.

VFA-105 became the first East Coast squadron to transition to the F/A-18E Super Hornet in July 2006. In March 2007, VFA-105 became the first operational Navy strike fighter squadron to be commanded by a female when CDR Sara Joyner took command.

=== 2010s ===
In May 2010 VFA-105 embarked on a 7-month deployment on board USS Harry S. Truman and returned home on 20 December 2010.

On 22 July 2013, VFA-105 deployed on board USS Harry S. Truman for a nine-month deployment in support of Operation Enduring Freedom. In January 2014 two squadron F/A-18Es were deployed on board the French aircraft carrier Charles de Gaulle for the first time.

=== 2020s ===
In October 2023, VFA-105 began a combat deployment within Air Wing Three onboard the Dwight D. Eisenhower. The deployment focused heavily within the CENTCOM AOR. For the majority of the deployment, VFA-105 operated from the Red Sea.

Constant combat operations occurred during the deployment, with VFA-105 conducting defensive and offensive operations against Houthi-Iranian military units in Yemen.

F/A-18Es from VFA-105 took part in air strikes on Yemen on 12 January 2024.

After 32 years with Carrier Air Wing Three, the Gunslingers along with VFA-83 were transferred to Carrier Air Wing Seven and the USS George H.W. Bush in October 2024.

As of 2026, the squadron currently flies a mix of two-seat F/A-18F Super Hornets and single-seat F/A-18E Super Hornets.

In late April 2026, VFA-105, as part of CVW 7 onboard the George H. W. Bush entered the CENTCOM AOR. VFA-105’s F/A-18Es and Fs began combat operations against Iran and undertook naval blockade sorties within Operation Epic Fury.

== See also ==
- Naval aviation
- Modern US Navy carrier air operations
- List of United States Navy aircraft squadrons
- List of Inactive United States Navy aircraft squadrons
