= VFA-81 =

Strike Fighter Squadron 81
- Active: 1 July 1955 - present
- Country: United States
- Branch: United States Navy
- Type: Fighter/Attack
- Role: Close air support Air interdiction Aerial reconnaissance
- Part of: Carrier Air Wing One
- Garrison/HQ: NAS Oceana
- Nickname: Sunliners
- Mottos: "Anytime, Anyplace"
- Engagements: Action in the Gulf of Sidra (1986); 1986 United States bombing of Libya; Gulf War; Operation Deny Flight; Operation Southern Watch; Operation Deliberate Force; Operation Enduring Freedom; Iraq War; Operation Inherent Resolve; Operation Prosperity Guardian; Operation Poseidon Archer

Commanders
- Current commander: CDR Craig K. Searles, USN

Aircraft flown
- Attack: A-4 Skyhawk; A-7 Corsair II
- Fighter: F9F-8B Cougar; F/A-18C Hornet; F/A-18E Super Hornet

Strike Fighter Squadron 81 (VFA-81), also known as the "Sunliners", is a United States Navy F/A-18E Super Hornet strike fighter squadron stationed at Naval Air Station Oceana. They are currently assigned to Carrier Air Wing 1. Their mission is to conduct prompt and sustained combat operations from the sea. The squadron was originally designated VA-66 on 1 July 1955, was redesignated VF-81 the same day, redesignated VA-81 on 1 July 1959, and finally redesignated VFA-81 on 4 February 1988. Their radio callsign is Inferno.

== Insignia and nickname ==
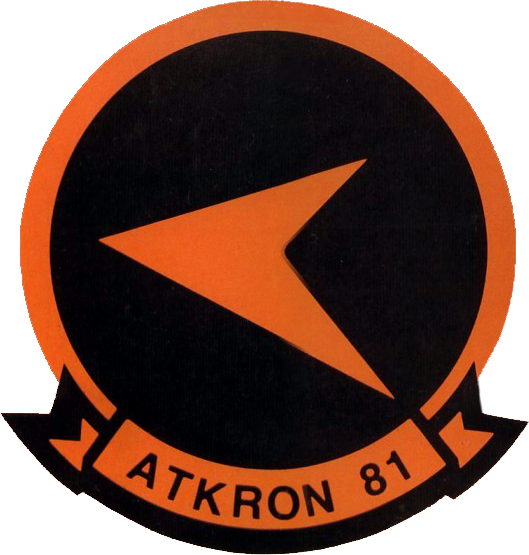
Squadron's second insignia.

The squadron was originally called Crusaders and their first insignia was approved by Chief of Naval Operations on 16 December 1955. The original insignia was a black cougar on a light blue background.

On 21 November 1963, the squadron was renamed the Sunliners and a new insignia was approved consisting of a black background with the international orange "Sun Dial" design. They also adopted the motto "Anytime, Anyplace" at this time.

When the squadron was redesignated VFA, a modification to the current design was made on 30 March 1988.

== History ==
=== 1950s ===
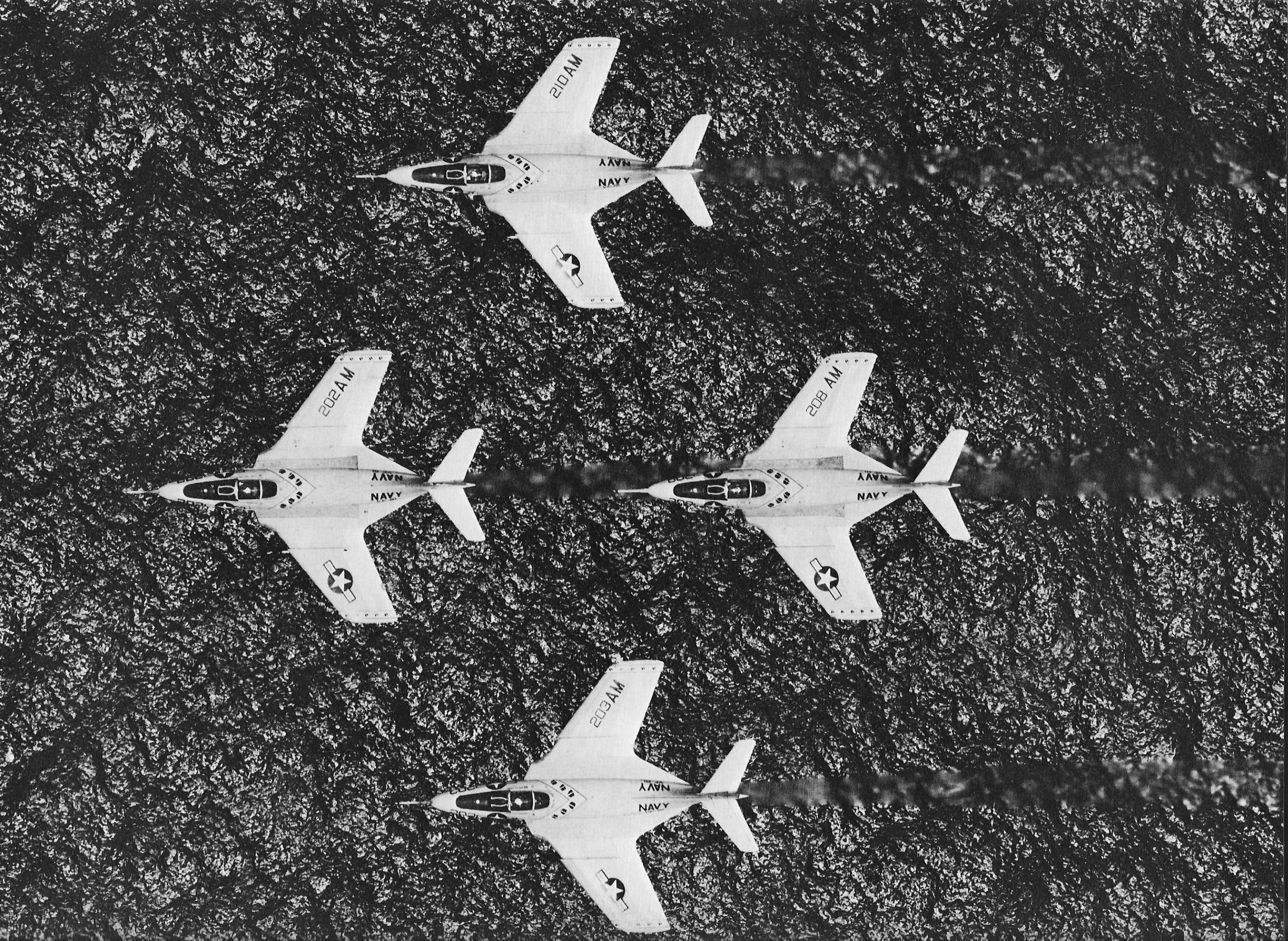
VF-81 F9F-8Bs from USS Intrepid in 1958.

The squadron was originally established as Attack Squadron 66 (VA-66) on 1 July 1955. On the same day, they were redesignated Fighter Squadron 81 (VF-81), an all weather fighter interceptor squadron flying the F9F-8B Cougar. Their first deployment was with CVG-17 in late 1956 aboard USS Franklin D. Roosevelt in response to the Suez Crisis. In 1958 VF-81 made a deployment as part of Air Task Group 181 (ATG-181) aboard USS Lake Champlain to the Mediterranean Sea. In the next year VF-81 went to sea with ATG-182 to the North Atlantic aboard USS Intrepid.

On 4 March 1959 VF-81 was reequipped with the A4D-2 Skyhawk and redesignated attack squadron VA-81 on 1 July 1959.

=== 1960s ===
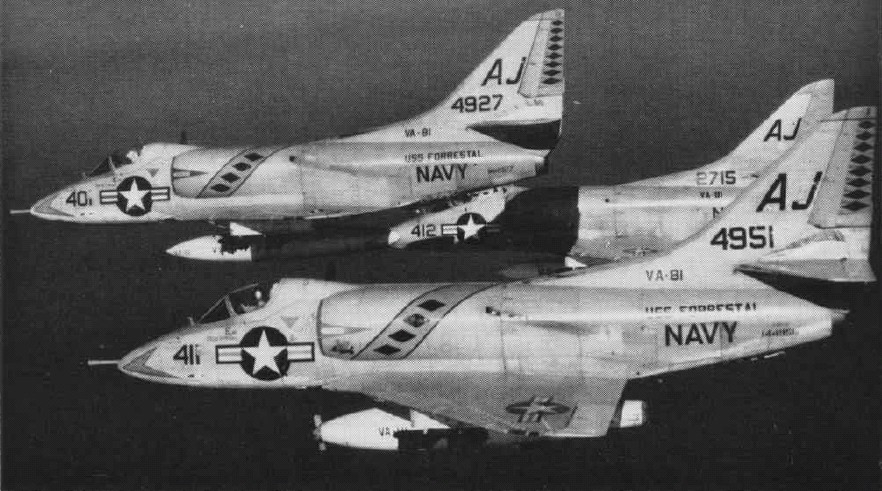
VA-81 A4D-2s from USS Forrestal in 1961

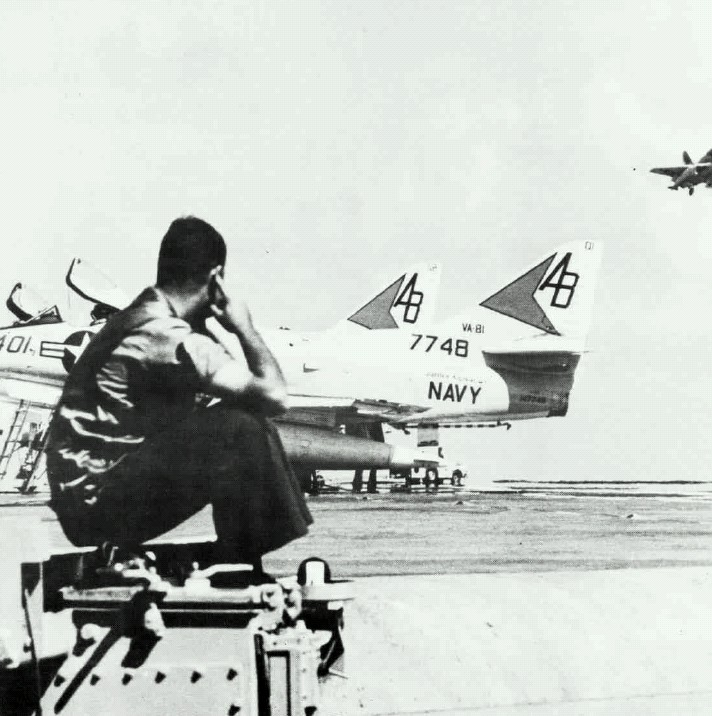
VA-81 A-4Cs on USS John F. Kennedy in 1969

VA-81 was assigned to CVG-8 and made five deployments to the Mediterranean Sea aboard USS Forrestal between 1960 and 1966.

From October 1961 to February 1962, a detachment of VA-81 Skyhawks deployed to the North Atlantic embarked on USS Essex. The detachment was provided air cover for antisubmarine warfare units embarked on USS Essex with their AIM-9 Sidewinder missiles. The detachment was the first jet unit to function as part of an antisubmarine killer force.

In April 1963 the squadron transitioned from the A-4B (A4D-2) to the A-4C Skyhawk.

In 1966 and 1967, VA-81 was deployed with CVG-8 to the Mediterranean, this time aboard USS Shangri-La. For the 1967/68 deployment aboard the same carrier, the squadron flew the A-4C.

In 1969 VA-81 A-4Cs made a single deployment to the Mediterranean aboard USS John F. Kennedy as part of CVW-1, operating for a time off the coast of Libya following the 1969 Libyan coup d'état.

=== 1970s ===
In February 1970, the squadron won the Navy Battle "E" for East Coast A-4 squadrons. In May 1970, VA-81 transitioned to the A-7E Corsair II and was reassigned to CVW-17.

Between 1971 and 1982 VA-81 made eight deployments to the 6th Fleet aboard USS Forrestal.

In December 1972, the squadron's A-7Es conducted cross-deck operations with the British carrier HMS Ark Royal.

From July to August 1974, VA-81 operated from USS Forrestal in the vicinity of Cyprus following the coup and subsequent Turkish invasion. Surveillance and cover missions were flown by the squadron during the crisis.

=== 1980s ===
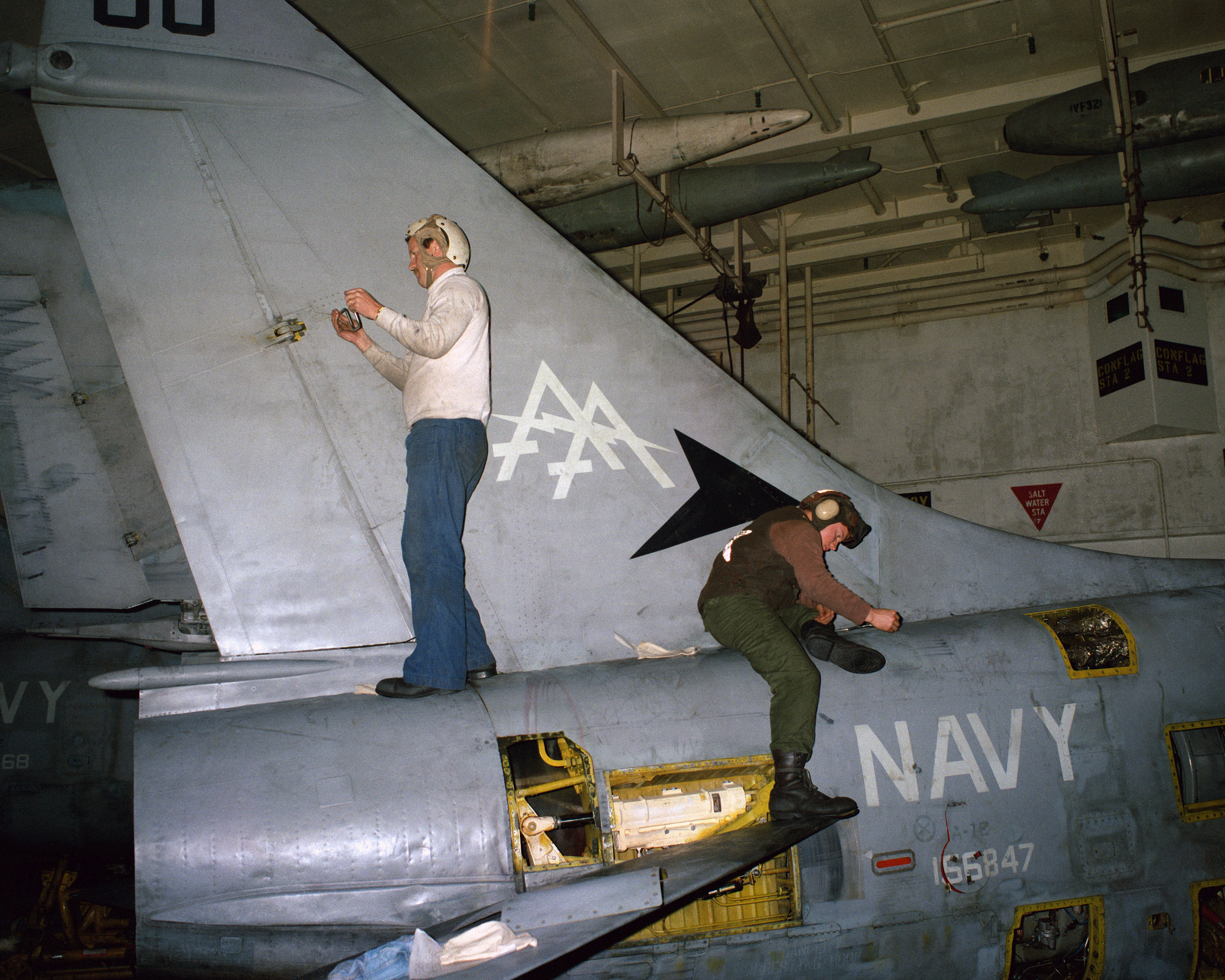
Crewmen service a VA-81 A-7E aboard USS Saratoga in 1986

VA-81 embarked on USS Forrestal from May to June 1981, operating in the eastern Mediterranean following Israeli reprisal raids against Syrian missile batteries located in southern Lebanon. In August 1981, the squadron participated a Freedom of Navigation Exercise in the Gulf of Sidra. During this exercise on 18 August, two F-14A Tomcats from USS Nimitz shot down two Libyan SU-22 Fitters. Tensions escalated, and VA-81 flew reconnaissance missions over potentially hostile Libyan ships.

Between 1984 and 1987 VA-81 made three deployments with USS Saratoga.

On 23 March 1986, while operating off coast of Libya, aircraft from Saratoga, USS Coral Sea and USS America crossed what Libyan leader Muammar al-Gaddafi had called the "Line of Death" and this escalated into the Action in the Gulf of Sidra (1986). The next day, three U.S. Navy warships crossed the same 32° 30' North latitude line. Two hours later, Libyan forces fired SA-5 Gammon surface-to-air missiles from the coastal town of Sirte. The missiles missed their F-14 targets and fell harmlessly into the water. Later that afternoon, U.S. aircraft turned back two Libyan MiG-25 fighter planes over the disputed Gulf of Sidra. In response an A-6E Intruder attacked a Libyan missile patrol boat operating on the "Line of Death." Later that night, VA-81 aircraft acted as the decoy group for VA-83's HARM strike against the Libyan missile radar site at Sirte. At the conclusion, three Libyan patrol boats and a radar site were destroyed by Navy aircraft.

On 4 February 1988, VA-81 transitioned to the F/A-18C Hornet and was redesignated Strike Fighter Squadron 81 (VFA-81).

=== 1990s ===
The squadron made three deployments aboard USS Saratoga between 1990 and 1994. On its first cruise operating the F/A-18, VFA-81 participated in the Gulf War. On 17 January 1991, the first night of the war, LCDR Scott Speicher was shot down and killed while flying an F/A-18C, by a Mig-25PDS piloted by Lt. Zuhair Dawood, 84th Fighter Squadron of the Iraqi Air Force, while flying a mission west of Baghdad.

On the same day, the squadron scored the Navy's only two aerial victories over enemy fighters during the campaign by downing two Iraqi MiG-21s en-route to bomb the H-3 Air Base in the western part of Iraq, by F/A-18Cs, the pilots being Nick "Mongo" Mongillo, callsign Quicksand 62, and Mark "MRT" Fox, callsign Quicksand 64. VFA-81 returned to its homeport of NAS Cecil Field, Florida on 27 March 1991, following the swift coalition victory. The squadron also participated in the last Mediterranean deployment of USS Saratoga, which was decommissioned in August 1994.

In 1996 VFA-81 made a cruise with CVW-17 aboard USS Enterprise, followed by a deployment aboard USS Dwight D. Eisenhower in 1998. Following this cruise, the squadron shifted its homeport to NAS Oceana, Virginia due to the BRAC-mandated closure of NAS Cecil Field in 1999.

=== 2000s ===
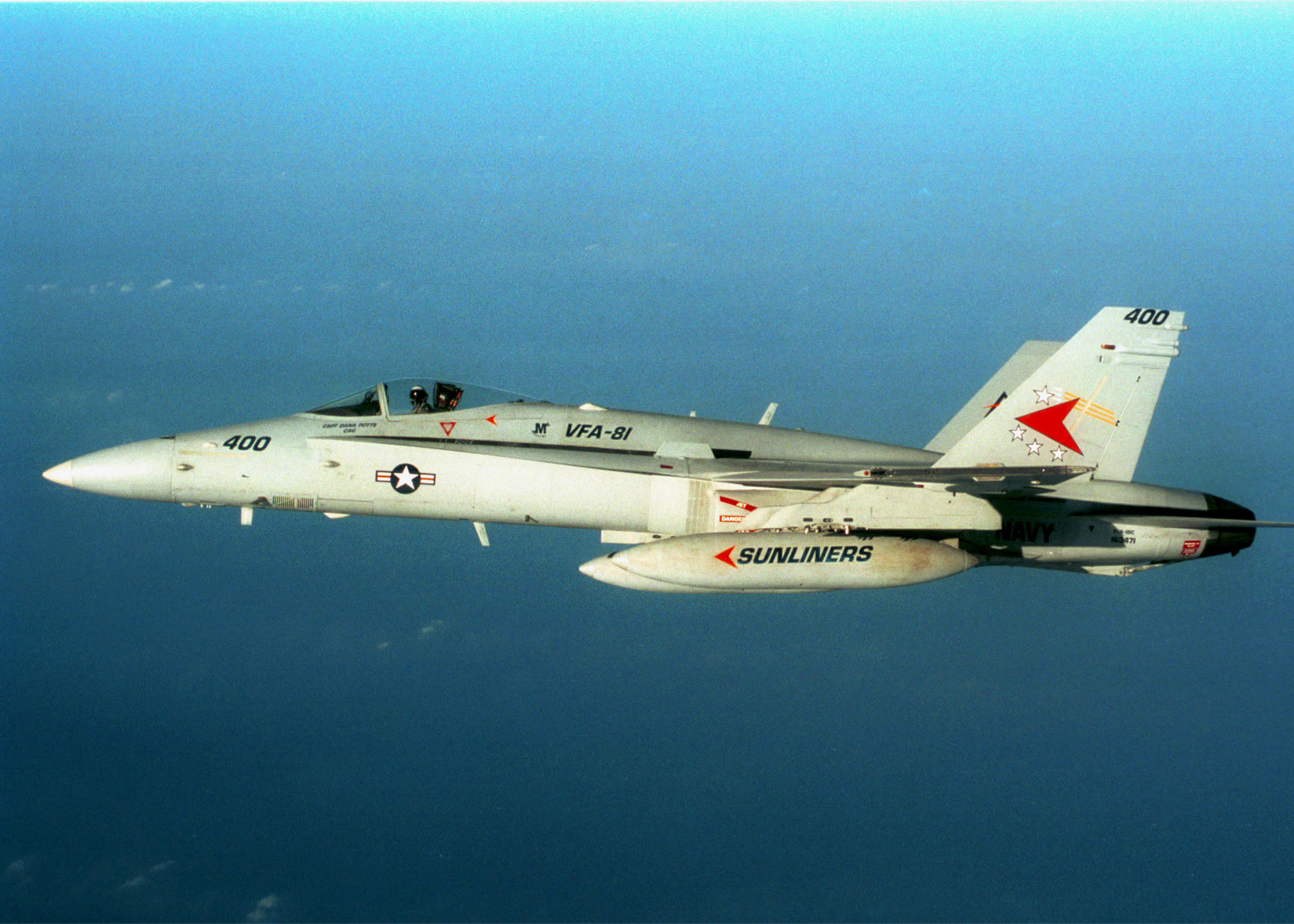
VFA-81 F/A-18C

In 2000, 2001 and 2002 VFA-81 made three deployments aboard USS George Washington to the Mediterranean Sea and the Persian Gulf. In 2004 VFA-81 made a single deployment aboard USS John F. Kennedy.

In 2007 VFA-81 was reassigned to CVW-11 in the Pacific Fleet and deployed aboard USS Nimitz to the Western Pacific and the Persian Gulf. Its last deployment ended on 3 June 2008, and the squadron began transition training from the F/A-18C Hornet to the F/A-18E Super Hornet.

=== 2010s ===
In 2011, the squadron was embarked with CVW-17 for a Western Pacific and Persian Gulf deployment aboard USS Carl Vinson.

In 2012, the squadron completed a surge deployment with Carrier Air Wing 17 aboard USS Carl Vinson.

In 2014, the squadron was embarked with CVW-17 aboard USS Carl Vinson in support of Operation Inherent Resolve and returned to NAS Oceana in 2015.

In spring 2018, the squadron was embarked with CVW-1 aboard USS Harry S. Truman in support of Operation Inherent Resolve and returned to NAS Oceana in late summer 2018.

=== 2020s ===
In late September 2024, VFA-81 and their F/A-18Es departed the US as part of CVW-1 on a scheduled deployment aboard the USS Harry S. Truman

Following multiple exercises with European militaries, VFA-81 and CVW-1 were ordered to operate in the Red Sea in defense of international shipping lanes and Israel against Houthi/Iran proxy military unit attacks from Yemen. VFA-81 and CVW-1 arrived in the CENTCOM AOR in mid December 2024 with combat operations against the Houthis/Iranians commencing upon arrival to the Red Sea.

Airstrikes were undertaken against the Houthis/Iranians for much of the later half of December 2024 through April 2025. Strikes against the Houthis/Iranian proxy military units in Yemen increased significantly following March 15, 2025, with VFA-81 and CVW-1 conducting increased sorties on a larger set of enemy targets.

== See also ==
- Naval aviation
- Modern US Navy carrier air operations
- List of United States Navy aircraft squadrons
- List of Inactive United States Navy aircraft squadrons
