= Naval Auxiliary Landing Field Fentress =

NALF Fentress
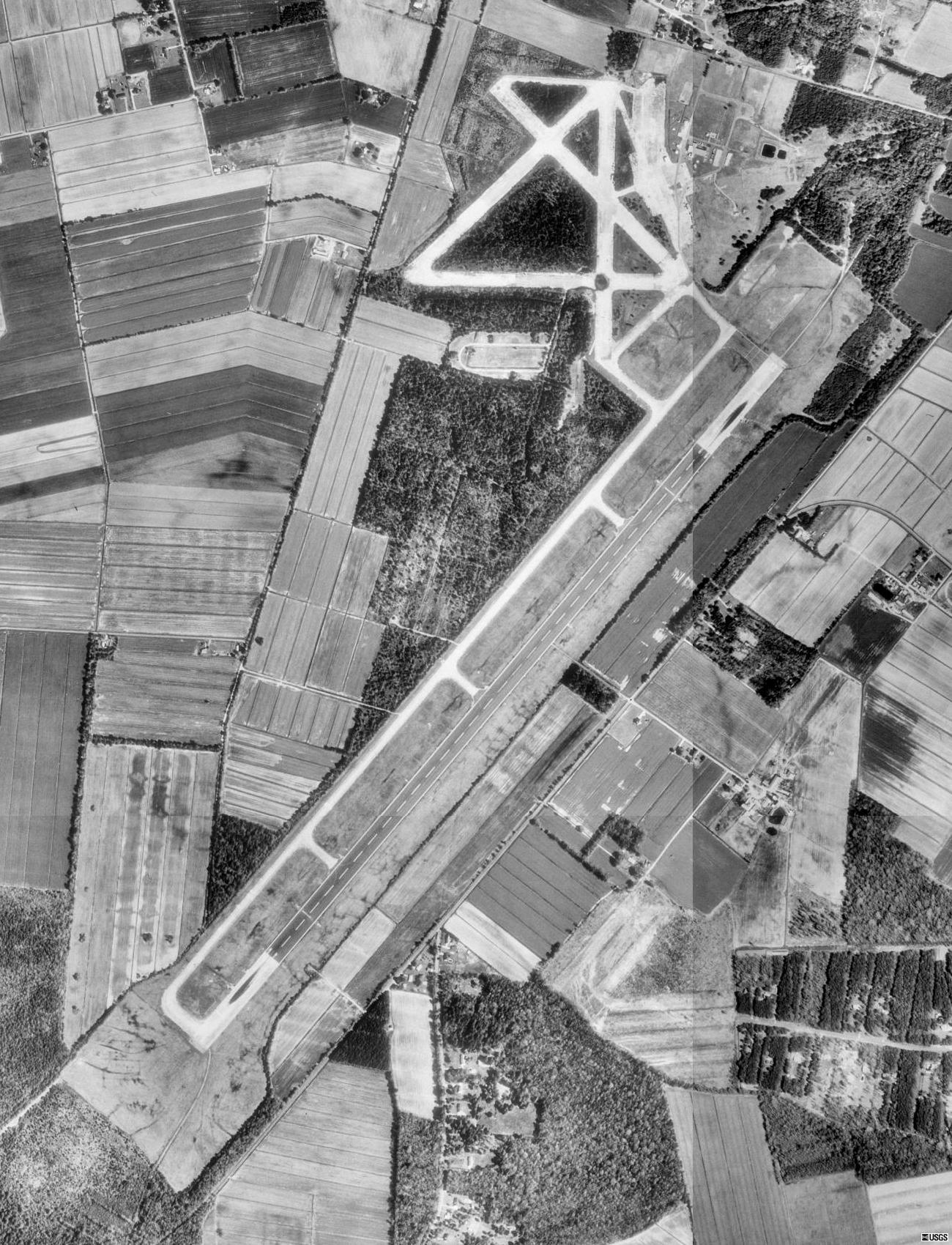
- USGS aerial image - 9 April 1990
- IATA: none; ICAO: KNFE; FAA LID: NFE

Summary
- Airport type: Military
- Owner: U.S. Navy
- Location: Chesapeake, Virginia
- Elevation AMSL: 16 ft / 5 m
- Coordinates: 36°41′31″N 076°08′04″W
- Interactive map of NALF Fentress

Runways
| Direction | Length | | Surface |
| Direction | ft | m | Surface |
|---|---|---|---|
| 5/23 | 8,004 | 2,440 | Asphalt |
- Source: Federal Aviation Administration

Naval Auxiliary Landing Field Fentress (ICAO: KNFE, FAA LID: NFE) is a military use airport located in Chesapeake, Virginia. This military airport is owned by the U.S. Navy and is under the operational control of Naval Air Station Oceana, Virginia. The airfield primarily supports day and night Field Carrier Landing Practice (FCLP) operations by US Navy and US Marine Corps F/A-18 Hornet, and US Navy F/A-18 Super Hornet, E-2 Hawkeye and C-2 Greyhound aircraft based in Virginia and the Carolinas.

Although many U.S. airports use the same three-letter location identifier for the FAA and IATA, this airport is assigned NFE by the FAA but has no designation from the IATA.

== Facilities ==
Fentress NALF has one operational runway designated Runway 5/23 with an asphalt surface measuring 8,004 by 175 feet (2,440 x 53 m). Four additional shorter paved runways dating from the airfield's original construction during World War II are located in the airfield's northern quadrant. These additional runways are closed to aircraft. On 5 July 2011, it was announced that NALF Fentress would close in January 2012 for 9 months for major repairs. Touch and go maneuvers would move to Naval Air Station Oceana and Naval Station Norfolk Chambers Field. As of 15 October 2012 the airfield was reopened.

== Encroachment issues ==
At the end of June 2014 the Chesapeake City Council voted unanimously to use city and state funds, who plan to put up about $1 million each, to buy property near the Fentress Naval airport in order to prevent encroachment onto the airfield. This is similar to a program of Virginia Beach, Virginia and the state of Virginia regarding Naval Air Station Oceana.
