= Carrier Air Wing One =

- CVW-1 Insignia
- Active: 1 July 1938 – present
- Country: United States
- Branch: United States Navy
- Type: Carrier air wing
- Part of: Naval Air Forces Atlantic
- Garrison/HQ: NAS Oceana
- Mottos: Primus et Principes (First and Foremost)
- Tail Code: AB
- Engagements: World War II; Vietnam War; Operation Formation Star; Operation Desert Shield; Operation Desert Storm; Operation Enduring Freedom; Operation Inherent Resolve; Operation Prosperity Guardian; Operation Poseidon Archer
- Decorations: Presidential Unit Citation (2)

Carrier Air Wing One (CVW-1) is a United States Navy aircraft carrier air wing based at Naval Air Station Oceana, Virginia, with most of its various squadrons also home based at NAS Oceana. Additional squadrons are based at Naval Station Norfolk/Chambers Field, Virginia; Marine Corps Air Station Beaufort, South Carolina; Naval Air Station Whidbey Island, Washington; and Naval Air Station Jacksonville, Florida.

Carrier Air Wing One is at present not assigned to a carrier.

== Mission ==
To conduct carrier air warfare operations and assist in the planning, control, coordination and integration of seven air wing squadrons in support of carrier air warfare including; Interception and destruction of enemy aircraft and missiles in all-weather conditions to establish and maintain local air superiority. All-weather offensive air-to-surface attacks, Detection, localization, and destruction of enemy ships and submarines to establish and maintain local sea control. Aerial photographic, sighting, and electronic intelligence for naval and joint operations. Airborne early warning service to fleet forces and shore warning nets. Airborne electronic countermeasures. In-flight refueling operations to extend the range and the endurance of air wing aircraft and Search and rescue operations.

== Subordinate units ==
CVW-1 consists of eight squadrons and one detachment.

Code	Insignia	Squadron	Nickname	Assigned Aircraft
VFA-11		Strike Fighter Squadron 11	Red Rippers	F/A-18F Super Hornet
VFA-31		Strike Fighter Squadron 31	Tomcatters	F/A-18E Super Hornet
VFA-37		Strike Fighter Squadron 37	Ragin Bulls	F/A-18E Super Hornet
VFA-81		Strike Fighter Squadron 81	Sunliners	F/A-18E Super Hornet
VAW-126		Carrier Airborne Early Warning Squadron 126	Seahawks	E-2D Hawkeye
VAQ-144		Electronic Attack Squadron 144	Main Battery	EA-18G Growler
VRC-40		Fleet Logistics Support Squadron 40 Det. 2	Rawhides	C-2A Greyhound
HSC-11		Helicopter Sea Combat Squadron 11	Dragon Slayers	MH-60S Seahawk
HSM-72		Helicopter Maritime Strike Squadron 72	Proud Warriors	MH-60R Seahawk

== History ==
Carrier Air Wing One has been in existence longer than any other Navy carrier air wing except for Carrier Air Wing Three, both were established on 1 July 1938. Since its establishment on 1 July 1938, CVW-1 has served aboard twenty different aircraft carriers, made 42 major deployments, and had a majority of the East Coast squadrons as members of the Navy's "First and Foremost." CVW-1 was originally the "Ranger Air Group", serving aboard USS Ranger during the early years of carrier aviation. The air group also operated aboard the other three carriers in commission at that time and beyond – USS Langley, USS Lexington, USS Saratoga

=== World War II ===
After the commencement of World War II, and until 1943, The air wing participated in the North African campaign and operated in all parts of the Atlantic and Pacific. On 3 August 1943 the Ranger Air Group was redesignated Carrier Air Group Four (CVG-4) and CVG-1 was reformed aboard USS Bennington. It saw action against Japan from the Philippines to Tokyo, earning two Presidential Unit Citations in addition to having nurtured many Naval Aviation heroes.

=== Suez Crisis and Vietnam ===
From 1946 to 1957, The Air Group was redesignated twice more. On 15 November in accordance with the Navy's new Air Group designation scheme it was redesignated CVAG-1, then on 1 September 1948 with another change in the Air Group designation scheme it became Carrier Air Group ONE (CVG-1) (it was the second use of the CVG-1 designation; the first Group designated CVG-1 existed during WWII from May 1943 to October 1945). The Air Group served aboard nine different carriers, including the first "Super Carrier", USS Forrestal, during the 1956-57 Suez Crisis. On 20 December 1963 all Carrier Air Groups were redesignated Carrier Air Wings and CVG-1 became Carrier Air Wing ONE (CVW-1). Between June 1966 and February 1967, CVW-1 conducted combat operations off the coast of Vietnam aboard USS Franklin D. Roosevelt. In 1975 on board USS John F. Kennedy, CVW-1 introduced the Navy's newest tactical aircraft, the F-14A Tomcat and the S-3A Viking, to the Mediterranean.

=== 1980s ===
CVW-1 was assigned to USS America in mid-1982, forming a partnership which ended with the ship's decommissioning in August 1996. During that time, the USS America/CVW-1 team conducted combat operations during the attack on Libya in 1986.

=== Gulf War ===
The USS America/CVW-1 team was the only carrier battle group to launch strikes in support of Operations Desert Shield and Desert Storm from both the Red Sea and Persian Gulf.

With America's decommissioning in August 1996, the air wing joined the USS George Washington battle group. CVW-1 and USS George Washington returned on 3 April 1998 from their first deployment in their two-year association.

Following its deployment with USS George Washington, CVW-1 returned to USS John F. Kennedy after a 24-year absence, and then deployed to the Mediterranean Sea and Persian Gulf.

=== 21st century ===
2006 deployment

During its 2006 deployment, Carrier Air Wing One delivered 65,000 pounds (29,483.50 kilograms) of ordnance, including 137 precision weapons, to provide air support of Operation Enduring Freedom – Afghanistan and Operation Iraqi Freedom. Its aircraft completed more than 8,300 sorties, of which 2,186 were combat missions, while flying more than 22,500 hours and making 6,916-day and night arrested landings. Carrier Air Wing One provided the first combat air support to Operation Enduring Freedom from an aircraft carrier in more than three years which also included Operation Medusa and Operation Mountain Fury. Carrier Strike Group Twelve also conducted a two-month deployment with the U.S. Seventh Fleet in the Western Pacific which included training exercises with Carrier Strike Group Five. This was the first time that an East Coast-based carrier air wing had operated in the western Pacific in 18 years. Finally, during its 2006 deployment, Carrier Air Wing One was the first U.S. Navy carrier air wing to use the Joint Mission Planning System (JMPS), a new computer system replacing the legacy mission planning computer system, Tactical Automated Mission Planning System (TAMPS).

2007 deployment

During its 2007 deployment to the U.S. Fifth Fleet, aircraft from Carrier Air Wing One flew more than 7,500 missions, which included 1,676 combat missions, and made more than 6,500 arrested landings for a total of 20,300 hours. Aircraft dropped 73 air-to-ground weapons and fired 4,149 rounds of 20-mm ammunition in support of ground forces in Iraq and Afghanistan. Also during this deployment, Carrier Air Wing One was the second U.S. Navy carrier air wing to deploy with the new ASQ-228 Advanced Targeting Forward Looking Infrared (ATFLIR) targeting system for its embarked F/A-18 strike fighters. This new system allows its pilots to use their weapon systems at higher altitude with greater accuracy and enhanced safety. Finally, the 2007 deployment marked the final cruise for squadron VS-32 and its S-3 Viking aircraft.

2011 deployment

During its 2011 deployment, aircraft from Carrier Air Wing One flew more than 1,450 sorties in support of Operation Enduring Freedom in Afghanistan and Operation New Dawn in Iraq.

2012 deployment

With the decommissioning of the USS Enterprise (CVN-65) on 1 December 2012, Carrier Air Wing One was reassigned to the USS Theodore Roosevelt (CVN-71), which was undergoing its mid-life Refueling and Complex Overhaul at Newport News Shipbuilding.

2015 deployment

On 11 March 2015, the Theodore Roosevelt Carrier Strike Group departed Naval Station Norfolk for around the world tour with deployments to the U.S. 5th, 6th and 7th Fleets, before arriving in the carrier's new homeport of San Diego, California, on 23 November.

2018 deployment

After Theodore Roosevelt's homeport change, CVW-1 was reassigned to USS Harry S. Truman (CVN-75), in 2016. Following the carrier's dockyard period ("Planned Incremental Availability") in 2016–2017, Carrier Strike Group 8 began its next scheduled deployment on 11 April 2018.

2022 deployment

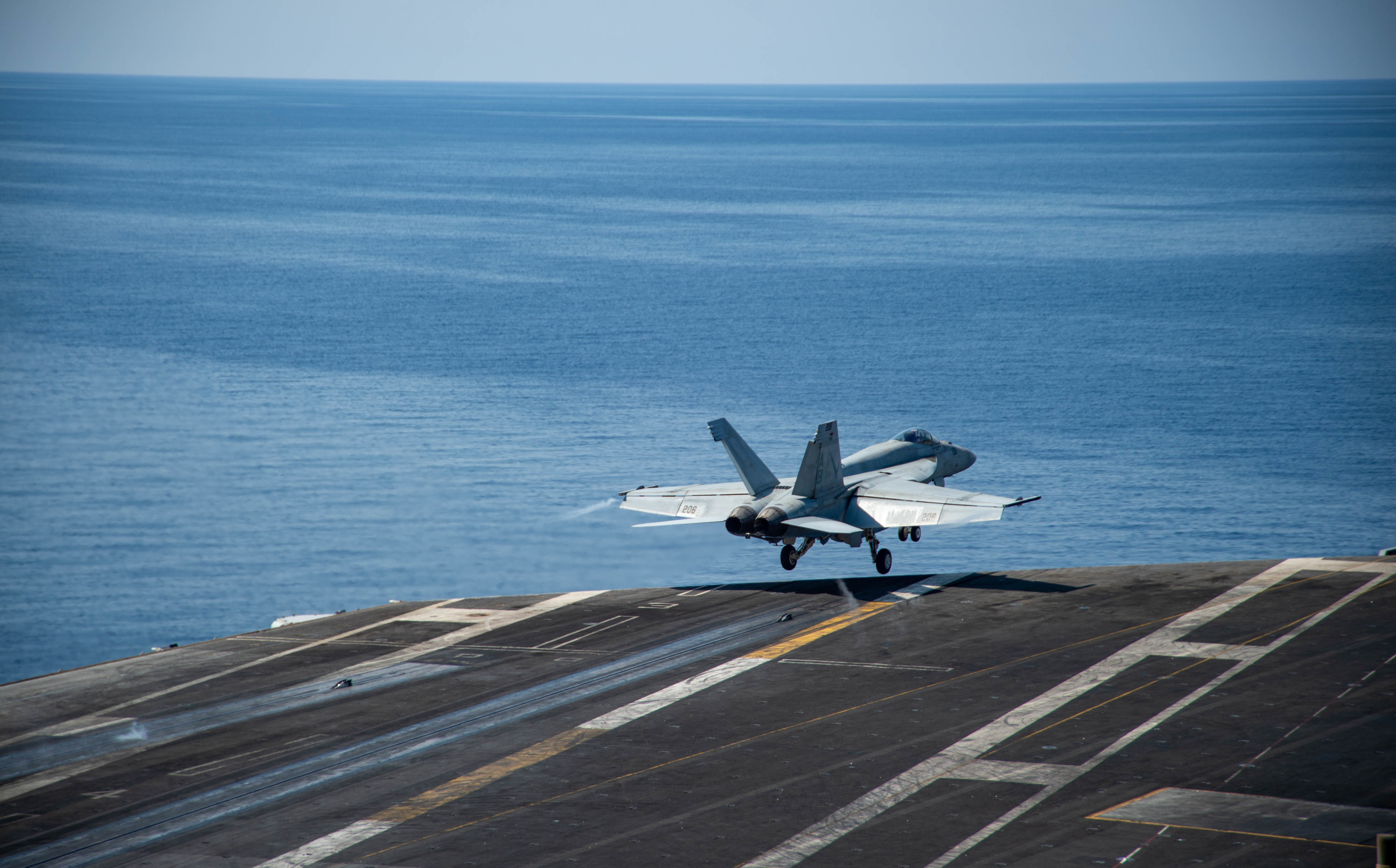
An F/A-18E of VFA-211 launches off Harry S. Truman, July 2022

The wing again deployed aboard the USS Harry S. Truman on 1 December 2021, and was originally headed to the Middle East; however in late December, the ship was held in the Mediterranean Sea due to rising tensions between Russia and Ukraine.

In the wake of the 2022 Russian invasion of Ukraine, CVW-1 aircraft participated in NATO's enhanced air policing efforts over Eastern Europe.

On 8 July 2022, one of the wing's F/A-18E Super Hornets was lost when it was blown overboard the Harry S. Truman into the Mediterranean Sea. The carrier had encountered unexpected heavy weather while conducting a replenishment-at-sea. One sailor received minor injuries. On 8 August 2022, the United States Sixth Fleet announced the aircraft had been recovered from a depth of 9,500 feet (2,900 m) using a remotely operated CURV-21 recovery vehicle. The aircraft was loaded aboard Military Sealift Command roll-on/roll-off ship USNS Mendonca (T-AKR-303) at the Port of Augusta on 16 August 2022 to be transported back to the United States.

== Current force ==
=== Fixed-wing aircraft ===
- Boeing F/A-18E/F Super Hornet
- Boeing EA-18G Growler
- Northrop Grumman E-2D Hawkeye
- Northrop Grumman C-2A Greyhound

=== Rotary wing aircraft ===
- Sikorsky MH-60R Seahawk
- Sikorsky MH-60S Seahawk

== See also ==
- History of the United States Navy
- List of United States Navy Carrier air wings
