= VFA-83 =

Airborne squadron of the US Navy

Strike Fighter Squadron 83
- Active: April 1950 - present
- Country: United States
- Branch: United States Navy
- Type: Fighter/Attack
- Role: Close air support Air interdiction Aerial reconnaissance
- Part of: Carrier Air Wing Seven
- Garrison/HQ: NAS Oceana
- Nickname: Rampagers
- Motto: Ram On!
- Engagements: 1958 Lebanon crisis Second Taiwan Strait Crisis; Multinational Force in Lebanon; Action in the Gulf of Sidra (1986); 1986 United States bombing of Libya; Gulf War; Operation Southern Watch; Iraq War; Operation Enduring Freedom; Operation Inherent Resolve; Operation Prosperity Guardian; 2024 missile strikes in Yemen; Operation Poseidon Archer; Operation Epic Fury

Commanders
- Current commander: CDR Jamie Moreno

Aircraft flown
- Attack: A-4 Skyhawk; A-7 Corsair II
- Fighter: F4U Corsair; F8F Bearcat; F9F Panther; F7U Cutlass; F/A-18C Hornet; F/A-18 Super Hornet

Strike Fighter Squadron 83 (VFA-83), also known as the "Rampagers", are a United States Navy F/A-18E Super Hornet fighter squadron stationed at Naval Air Station Oceana. They are a part of Carrier Air Wing 7, their tailcode is AG and their radio callsign is Ram.

== Insignia and nickname ==
The squadron was first known as the Roaring Bulls and the first insignia was approved by Chief of Naval Operations on 16 May 1950, consisting of a black bull with machine gun barrels for horns. The squadron was renamed and the first Rampager insignia was approved on 12 April 1957.

== History ==
=== 1950s ===
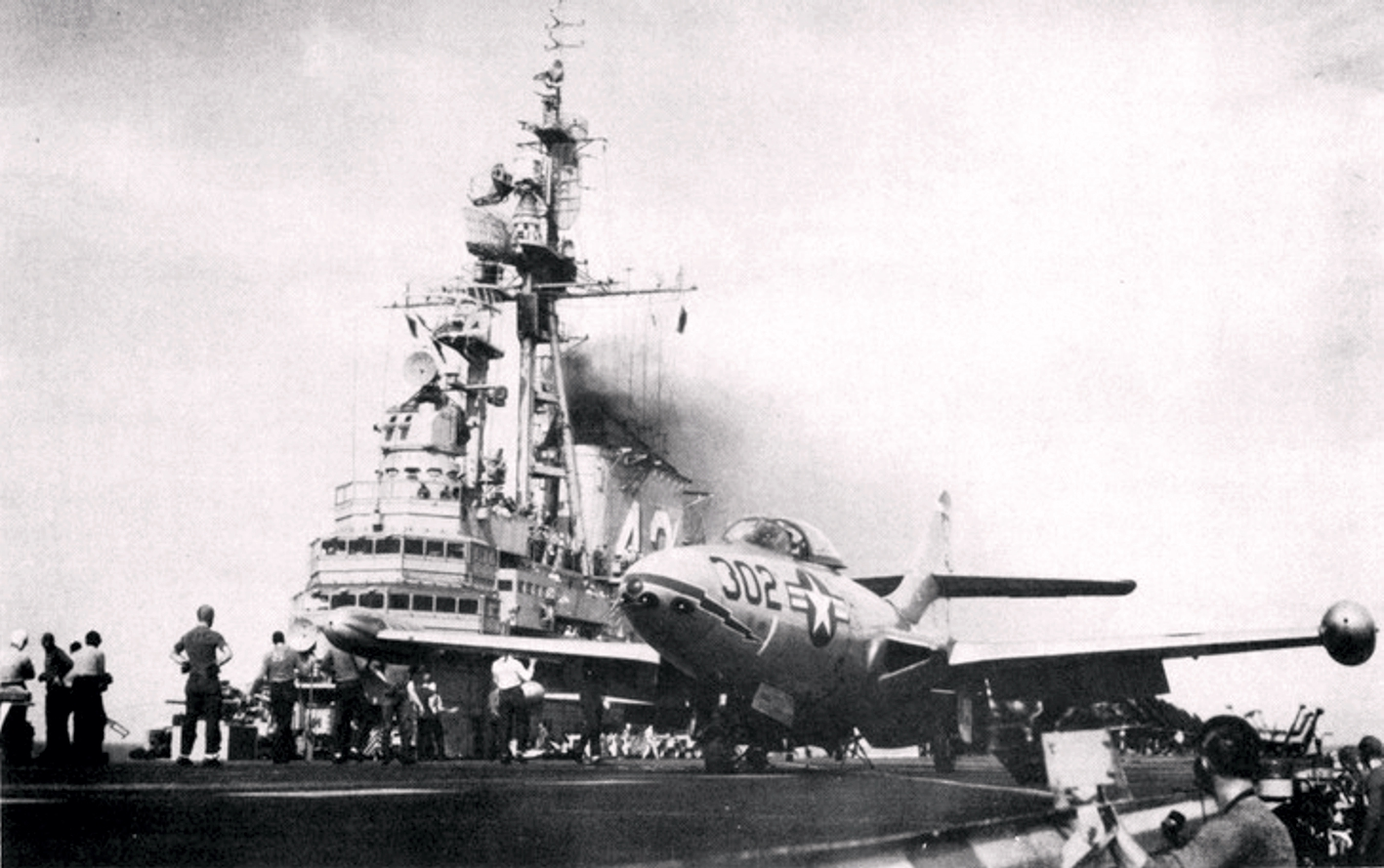
F9F-5 Panther of VF-83, 1953.

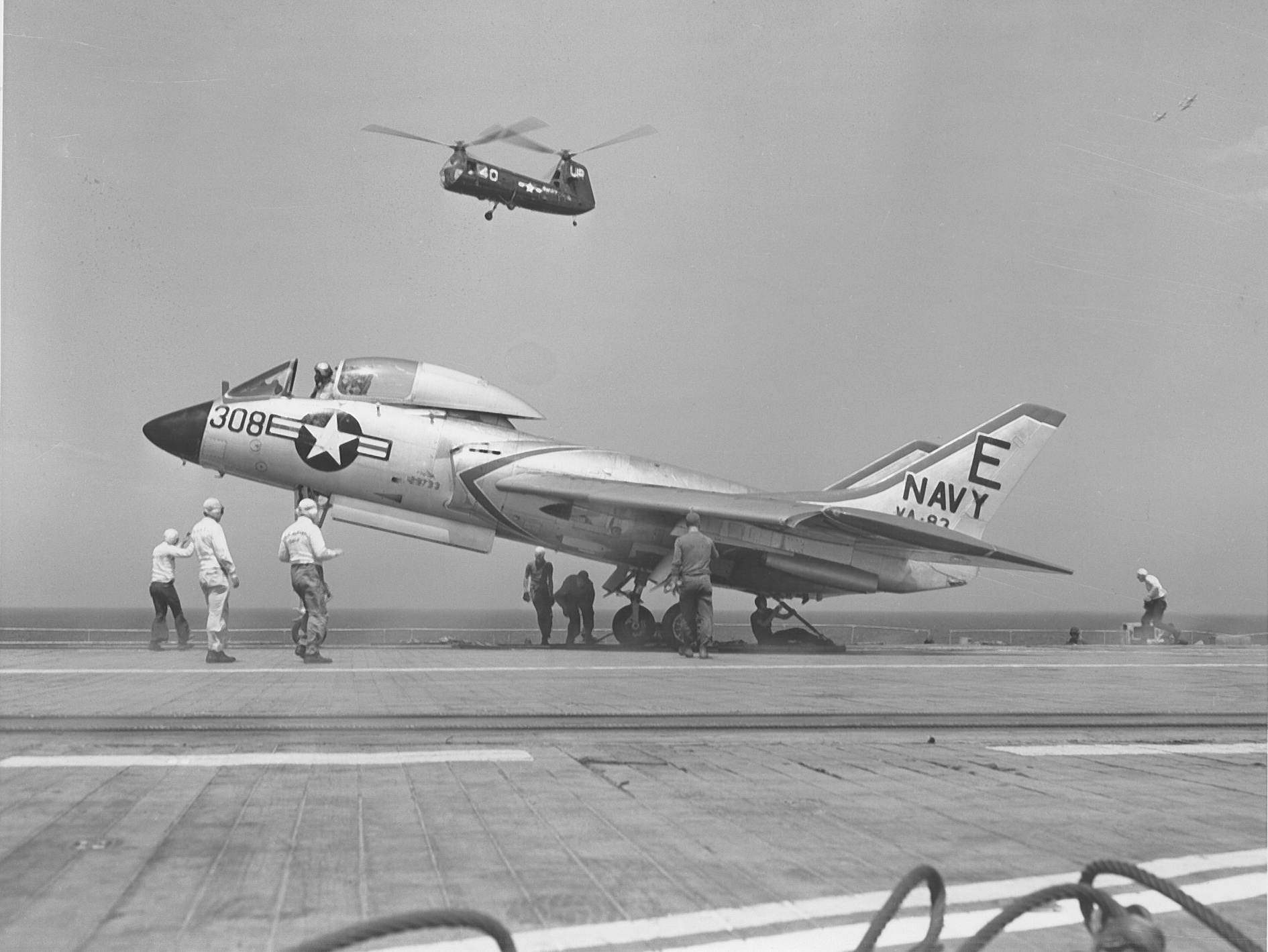
VA-83 F7U-3M on USS Intrepid in 1956

The squadron was originally established as Naval Reserve Fighter Squadron 916 (VF-916) at NAS Squantum in Massachusetts in April 1950. VF-916 was called to active duty at NAS Jacksonville on 11 February 1951 and moved to NAS Oceana, Virginia in September 1951. The squadron was assigned to Carrier Air Group 8 (CVG-8) and was equipped with the F4U-4 Corsair. CVG-8 was deployed aboard USS Tarawa to the Mediterranean Sea from November 1951 to June 1952. Afterwards VF-916 transitioned to the F9F-5 Panther. They also flew the F8F Bearcat for a short time in 1952. On 4 February 1953, the squadron was redesignated Fighter Squadron Eighty Three (VF-83). In the same year VF-83 made a deployment aboard USS Coral Sea to the Mediterranean Sea. In August 1954, VF-83 transitioned to the F7U-3M Cutlass equipped with the AIM-7 Sparrow air-to-air missile, and on 1 July 1955 was re-designated as attack squadron VA-83. VA-83 made another deployment to the Mediterranean Sea aboard USS Intrepid in 1956, this being the first overseas deployment of a naval missile squadron.

The squadron received the A4D-1 Skyhawk in March 1957 and then in December 1957, was the first fleet squadron to receive the A4D-2 version, which was the first to be equipped with an aerial refueling capability.

From July to August 1958 following continued civil violence in Lebanon, VA-83 was deployed as part of Air Task Group 201 (ATG-201) aboard USS Essex. The squadron flew sorties during the U.S. Marine Corps landings in Lebanon, and two of its aircraft were hit by hostile small arms fire receiving minor damage. In September 1958 the squadron conducted flight operations from USS Essex while operating in the Taiwan Straits in response to the People’s Republic of China shelling of the Quemoy Islands.

=== 1960s ===
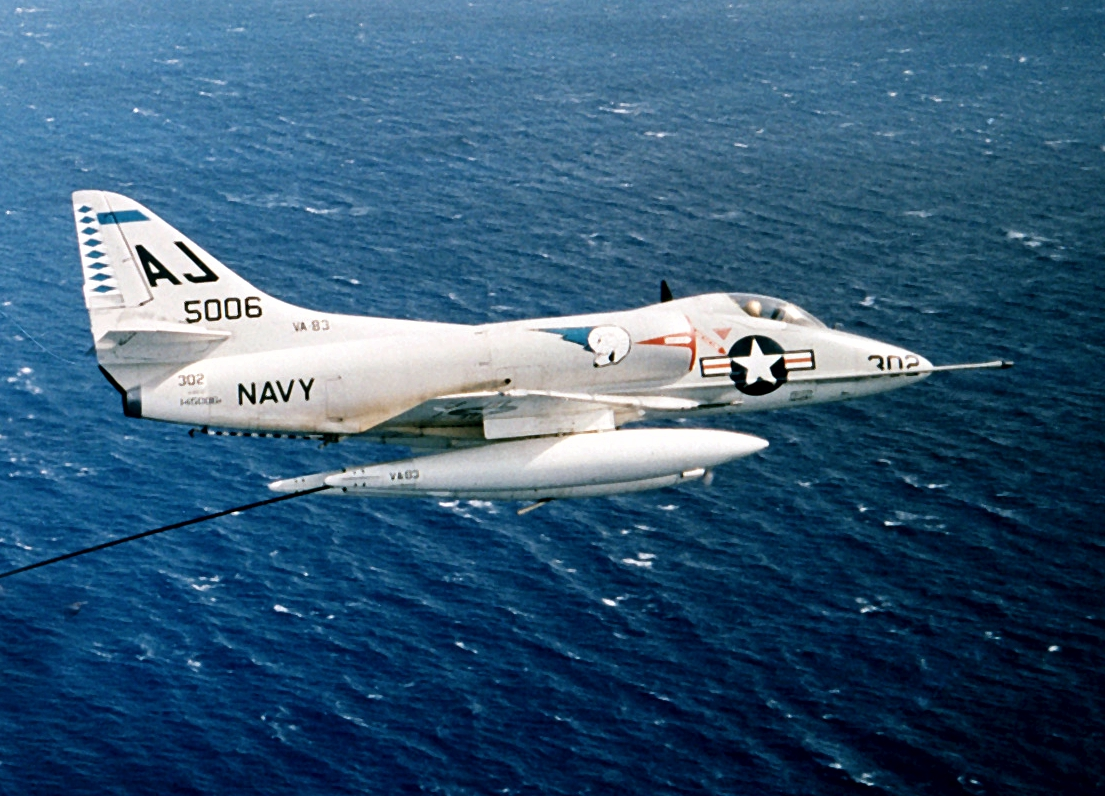
VA-83 A-4B Skyhawk in 1960

From 1960 to 1966 VA-83 made five deployments with CVW-8 aboard USS Forrestal to the Mediterranean Sea, the first still flying the A-4B, then two with the A-4C, and two with the A-4E. In 1961 and 1962 they won the COMNAVAIRLANT Battle “E”. In August 1962, a squadron A4D-2N Skyhawk cross-decked aboard the British carrier HMS Hermes. In late 1963 a detachment of VA-83 also operated from USS Lake Champlain providing fighter cover for Anti-Submarine Carrier Air Group 52 (CVSG-52). On 15 June 1966 they re-located to NAS Cecil Field in Florida. In 1966-67 and 1967-68 CVW-8 and VA-83 were deployed on USS Shangri-La, and in 1969 on USS John F. Kennedy. During the last two deployments the squadron flew again A-4Cs.

=== 1970s ===
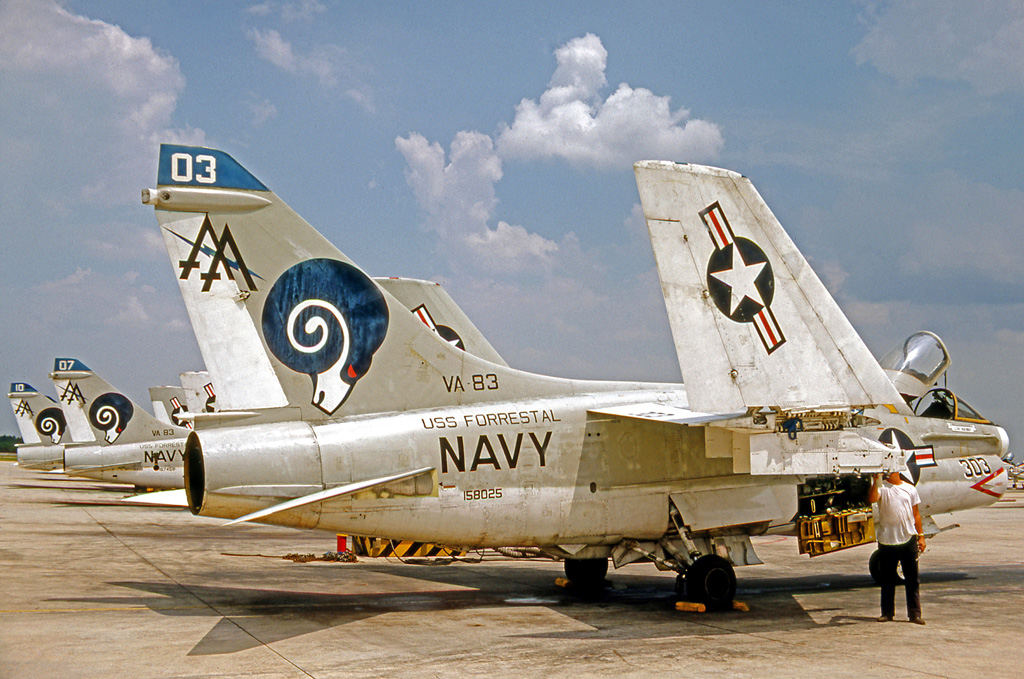
VA-83 A-7E Corsair IIs wearing the colourful Rampagers 1970s paint scheme

In June 1970, VA-83 transitioned to the A-7 Corsair II and was reassigned to Carrier Air Wing Seventeen (CVW-17). From January 1971 to November 1982 VA-83 deployed eight times aboard USS Forrestal to the Mediterranean Sea. In 1973, the squadron won its third CNO Aviation Safety Award and in March 1974 they began their 14th Mediterranean deployment.

From July to August 1974, the squadron operated in the vicinity of Cyprus following a coup in that country and its invasion by Turkish forces. In 1975 they completed their 25th year as an active squadron, and had amassed 20,000 accident free flight hours which earned them another CNO Safety Award. Between 1975 and 1982 they made three deployments, including training operations with NATO allies in the North Atlantic.

=== 1980s ===
From May to June 1981 while embarked on USS Forrestal, VA-83 operated in the eastern Mediterranean following Israeli reprisal raids against Syrian missile batteries located in southern Lebanon.

In August 1981, the squadron participated in a Freedom of Navigation Exercise in the Gulf of Sidra. During this exercise two F-14 Tomcats from USS Nimitz shot down two Libyan SU-22 Fitters on 18 August, in what became known as the "Gulf of Sidra incident". Tensions escalated and VA-83 flew reconnaissance missions over potentially hostile Libyan ships.

In 1982 they deployed to support peacekeeping forces in Lebanon. Between 1984 and 1994 VA-83 and CVW-17 were assigned for six deployments to USS Saratoga. During the 1985-1986 cruise they supported operations in the Indian Ocean as well as operations in the Mediterranean Sea and Operation El Dorado Canyon against Libya. Squadron aircraft fired AGM-88 HARMs against a Libyan missile radar site, marking the first use of that missile in combat.

1987 marked their final deployment with the A-7, and in November they began the transition to the F/A-18C Hornet, and on 1 March 1988 were re-designated to Strike Fighter Squadron (VFA-83).

=== 1990s ===
In mid-1990 they made their first Hornet deployment aboard USS Saratoga in support of Operation Desert Shield and Operation Desert Storm. For 43 days they flew 237 combat missions over Iraq and Kuwait, they were awarded the 1990 COMNAVAIRLANT Battle “E” and the 1991 CNO Aviation Safety Award.

In 1992 they deployed to the Adriatic Sea supporting United Nations operations in former Yugoslavia. In 1994 they made a second deployment to the area, which also marked the first ever detachment to Jordan. They were awarded their sixth CNO Aviation Safety Award in 1994. In 1996 the squadron deployed to the Mediterranean Sea, the Adriatic Sea and the Persian Gulf on board USS Enterprise in support of Operation Southern Watch. In 1996 they were awarded the Battle “E” and Michael J. Estocin Award, as the best F/A-18 squadron in the US Navy. The squadron was then equipped with the F/A-18C(N). In April 1998 VFA-83 was relocated to NAS Oceana, Virginia. During the same year the squadron was deployed aboard USS Dwight D. Eisenhower to the Mediterranean Sea.

=== 2000s ===
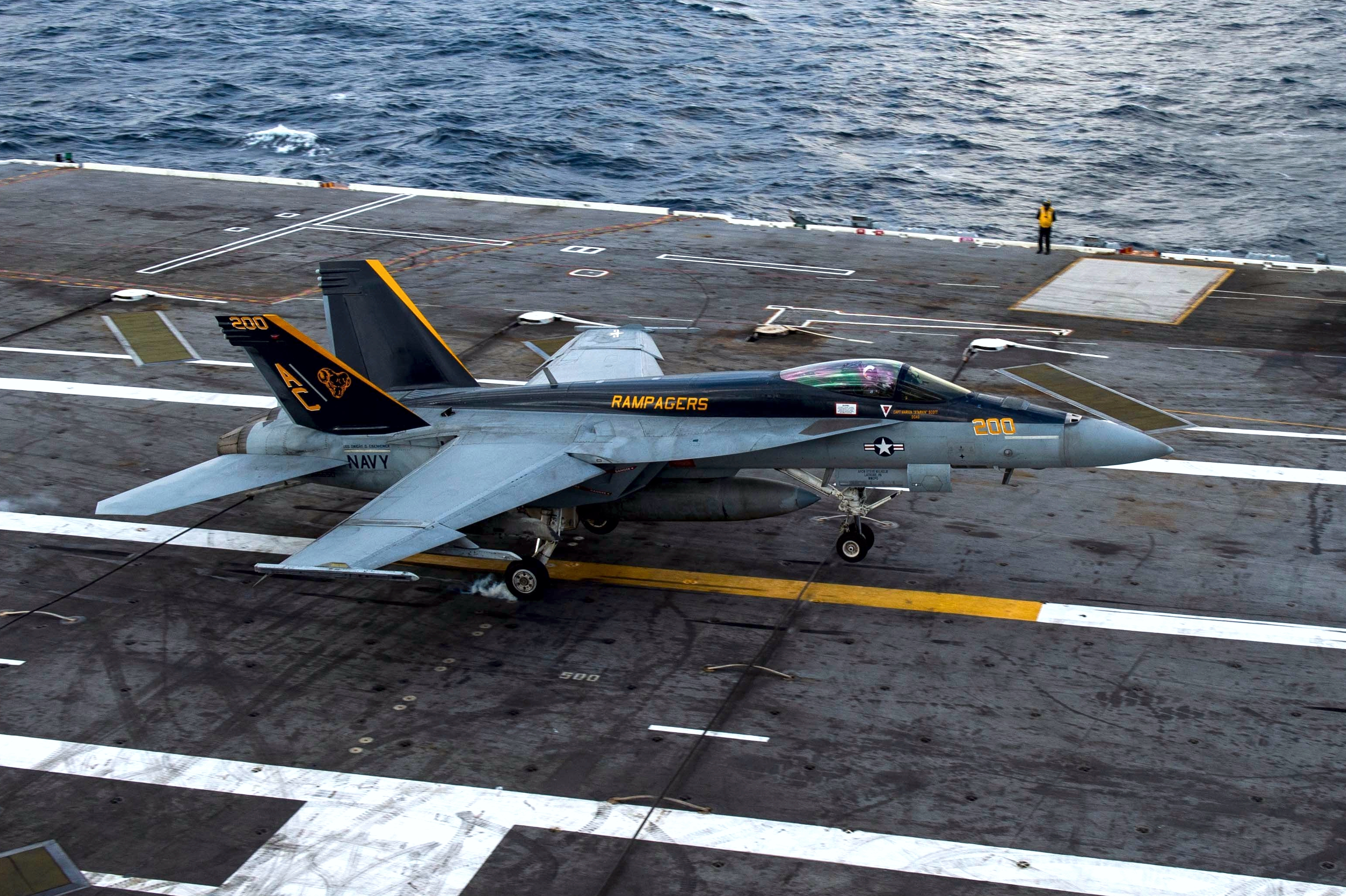
VFA-83 F/A-18E landing on USS Dwight D. Eisenhower in December 2022

CVW-17 was then reassigned to the carrier USS George Washington and made two deployments to the Mediterranean Sea and the Arabian Sea in 2000 and 2002, supporting Operation Enduring Freedom and Operation Iraqi Freedom. These operations continued in 2004 during the last deployment of USS John F. Kennedy.

VFA-83 was then reassigned to Carrier Air Wing Seven and deployed again on USS Dwight D. Eisenhower to the Mediterranean Sea and the Indian Ocean from October 2006 to May 2007. As USS Dwight D. Eisenhower was refitted in 2008, the strike fighter squadrons of CVW-7 were assigned to CVW-17 and conducted a work-up period on USS George Washington. During that cruise CVW-7's squadrons retained their tail code "AG".

As of August 2018, the Rampagers have transitioned to the F/A-18 Super Hornet.

In October 2023, VFA-83 began a combat deployment within Air Wing Three onboard the Dwight D. Eisenhower. The deployment focused heavily within the CENTCOM AOR. For the majority of the deployment, VFA-83 operated from the Red Sea.

Constant combat operations occurred during the deployment, with VFA-83 conducting defensive and offensive operations against Houthi-Iranian military units in Yemen. VFA-83 was at the forefront of operations against Houthi-Iranian launched drones.

In late April 2026, VFA-83, as part of CVW 7 onboard the George H. W. Bush entered the CENTCOM AOR. VFA-83’s F/A-18Es began combat operations against Iran and undertook naval blockade sorties within Operation Epic Fury.

== See also ==
- Naval aviation
- Modern US Navy carrier air operations
- List of United States Navy aircraft squadrons
- List of Inactive United States Navy aircraft squadrons
