= Jay L. Johnson =

United States Navy admiral

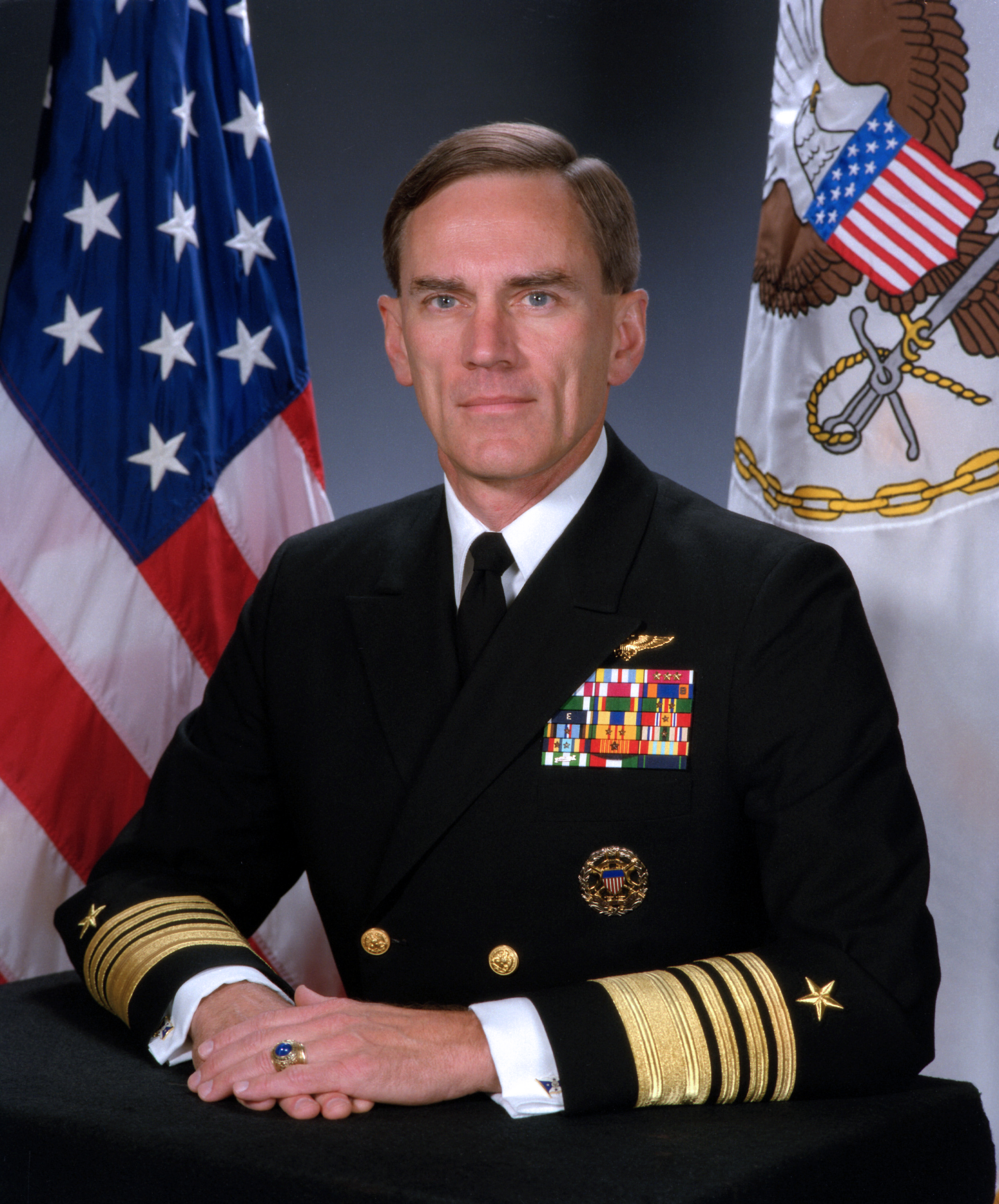
- Admiral Jay L. Johnson
- Born: June 5, 1946 (age 80); Great Falls, Montana, US
- Military career
- Branch: United States Navy
- Service years: 1968–2000
- Rank: Admiral
- Commands: Chief of Naval Operations; United States Second Fleet; Carrier Group 8 Carrier Air Wing One; VF-84 (1955–1995)
- Conflicts: Vietnam War; Gulf War
- Awards: Defense Distinguished Service Medal (2); Navy Distinguished Service Medal; Defense Superior Service Medal; Legion of Merit (4)
- Other work: CEO of General Dynamics Corp.

Jay Lynn Johnson (born June 5, 1946) is a retired United States Navy admiral who served as the 26th Chief of Naval Operations from 1996 to 2000. He was later president and chief executive officer of General Dynamics.

== Early life ==
Johnson was born in Great Falls, Montana, on June 5, 1946, and raised in West Salem, Wisconsin. An Eagle Scout and later recipient of the Distinguished Eagle Scout Award, he graduated in 1968 from the United States Naval Academy. His Naval Academy classmates included Admirals Michael Mullen and Dennis C. Blair, Generals Charles Bolden and Michael Hagee; as well as Lt. Col Oliver North and Senator Jim Webb. Upon completion of flight training, Johnson was designated a Naval Aviator in 1969.

== Naval career ==
Johnson's first sea-duty tour was aboard the carrier USS Oriskany, where he made two combat cruises flying the F-8J Crusader with Fighter Squadron 191 (VF-191). Subsequent squadron and sea duty tours after transitioning to the F-14 Tomcat included: VF-142, VF-101, commanding officer of VF-84 (1955–1995); commander, Carrier Air Wing One and assistant chief of staff for operations for commander, United States Sixth Fleet.

Shore duty assignments included: aviation junior officer detailer and head, Aviation Officer Junior Assignment Branch at the Bureau of Naval Personnel in Washington, D.C.; student, Armed Forces Staff College, in Norfolk, Virginia; and the Chief of Naval Operations Strategic Studies Group at The Pentagon.

Johnson's first flag officer assignment was as assistant chief of naval personnel for distribution in the Bureau of Naval Personnel. In October 1992, he reported as commander, Carrier Group 8/Commander, USS Theodore Roosevelt Battle Group. In July 1994, he was assigned as commander, Second Fleet/Commander, Striking Fleet Atlantic/Commander, Joint Task Force 120.

In March 1996, he reported for duty as the 28th Vice Chief of Naval Operations in Washington, D.C.

In August 1996, Johnson became the 26th Chief of Naval Operations following the death of Admiral Jeremy M. Boorda, and served until July 21, 2000.

== Later career ==
Johnson was executive vice president of Dominion Resources, Inc., from December 2002 to September 2008, also serving as senior vice president of Dominion Energy, Inc., from 2000 to 2002; president and chief executive officer of Dominion Delivery from 2002 to 2007; and chief executive officer of Dominion Virginia Power from October 2007 to September 2008.

Johnson has been a director of General Dynamics, one of the largest U.S. defense contractors, since 2003. He served as vice chairman from September 2008 to July 2009, and president and chief executive officer from then until January 2013, when he was succeeded by Phebe Novakovic.

== Awards and decorations ==

Naval Aviator Badge
Defense Distinguished Service Medal (with 1 Oak Leaf Cluster)	Navy Distinguished Service Medal	Defense Superior Service Medal
Legion of Merit w/ 3 gold award stars	Defense Meritorious Service Medal	Meritorious Service Medal
Air Medal w/ bronze strike/flight numeral 8	Navy and Marine Corps Commendation Medal	Navy Unit Commendation
Navy Meritorious Unit Commendation with 2 bronze service stars	Navy Expeditionary Medal	National Defense Service Medal with 1 service star
Armed Forces Expeditionary Medal with 1 service star	Vietnam Service Medal with 2 service stars	Southwest Asia Service Medal with 1 service star
Armed Forces Service Medal	Navy Sea Service Deployment Ribbon with 6 service stars	Vietnam Gallantry Cross with bronze star
Armed Forces Honor Medal, 1st class (Vietnam)	Order of National Security Merit, Tong-il Medal (Republic of Korea)	NATO Medal for Former Yugoslavia
Vietnam Campaign Medal	Kuwait Liberation Medal (Kuwait)	Navy Marksmanship Ribbon for Pistol
Joint Chiefs of Staff Identification Badge

- Distinguished Eagle Scout Award

Military offices
Preceded by Jeremy M. Boorda	Chief of Naval Operations; 1996–2000	Succeeded by Vern Clark
