= VFA-101 =

Strike Fighter Squadron 101
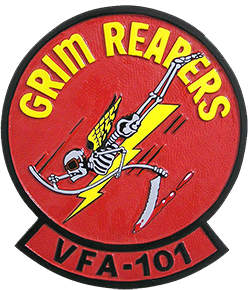
- VFA-101 Insignia
- Active: 1952–2005, 2012–2019
- Country: United States of America
- Branch: United States Navy
- Type: Strike Fighter Squadron
- Role: Training
- Garrison/HQ: Eglin Air Force Base
- Engagements: Korean War

Aircraft flown
- Fighter: FG-1D Corsair; F2H Banshee; F4D Skyray; F3H Demon; F-4 Phantom II; F-14 Tomcat; F-35C Lightning II

Strike Fighter Squadron 101 (VFA-101), also known as the "Grim Reapers", was a United States Navy Fleet Replacement Squadron (FRS) based at Eglin AFB, Florida. After the West Coast FRS for the F-14 Tomcat, VF-124, was disestablished in the mid-1990s, VF-101 became the sole F-14 FRS. At the time it was based at NAS Oceana in Virginia. With the retirement of the F-14, VF-101 was deactivated in 2005. It was reactivated in 2012 and redesignated Strike Fighter Squadron 101 (VFA-101). It was one of two F-35C Lightning II FRS before being deactivated in 2019. It was based at Eglin AFB, Florida with the joint 33d Fighter Wing (33 FW), as a subordinate unit of the U.S. Navy's Strike Fighter Wing, U.S. Pacific Fleet.

== History ==
Two distinct squadrons have been called the Grim Reapers, VF-10 and later VF-101, which is the main subject of this article. Officially, the US Navy does not recognize a direct lineage with disestablished squadrons if a new squadron is formed with the same designation or nickname. Often, the new squadron will assume the nickname, insignia, and traditions of the earlier squadrons.

=== 1950s ===
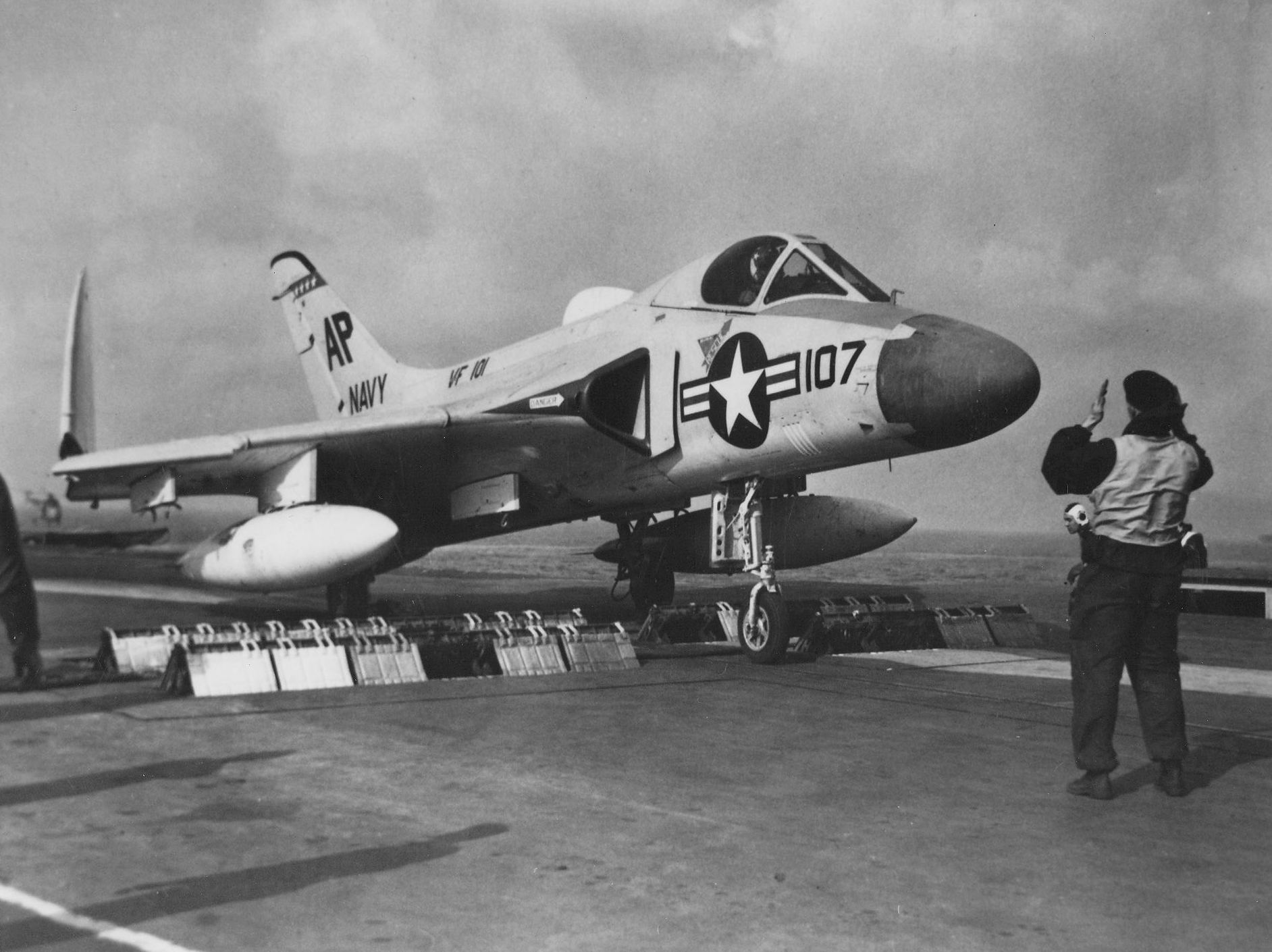
VF-101 F4D-1 aboard HMS Ark Royal in 1957

On 1 May 1952, VF-101 was established at NAS Cecil Field, Florida. This new squadron assumed the nickname and traditions of the previous Grim Reapers and flew the FG-1D Corsair in the Korean War. Later in 1952, VF-101 received the jet-powered F2H-2 Banshee. The squadron was assigned to Carrier Air Group 1 aboard the USS Midway and circumnavigated the globe between 27 December 1954 and 14 July 1955.

In 1956, VF-101 transitioned to the F4D-1 Skyray, their first radar-equipped aircraft. The squadron was only once deployed for a short time during NATO Operation Strikeback from 3 September to 22 October 1957, this time being assigned to Carrier Air Group 7 aboard the USS Saratoga. In April 1958, VF-101 was merged with the Fleet All Weather Training Unit Atlantic and began to train all weather fighter pilots on both the F4D-1 and the F3H-2 Demon. In becoming part of the training structure, VF-101 became part of Readiness Attack Carrier Air Wing 4 and ceased to be a deployable unit.

=== 1960s ===
In June 1960, VF-101 established "Detachment A" at NAS Oceana which operated the F4H-1 Phantom II. By the end of 1962, the Skyray and the Demon had been phased out in favor of the F-4. Detachment A was disestablished and F-4 training moved to NAS Key West, Florida. On 1 May 1966, a new detachment was formed at NAS Oceana primarily to train replacement pilots and Radar Intercept Officers in the areas of aerial refueling, carrier qualification and conventional weapons. The Key West unit concentrated on air-to-air combat, missile firing and radar intercept techniques. In August 1967, VF-101 received the F-4J.

=== 1970s ===
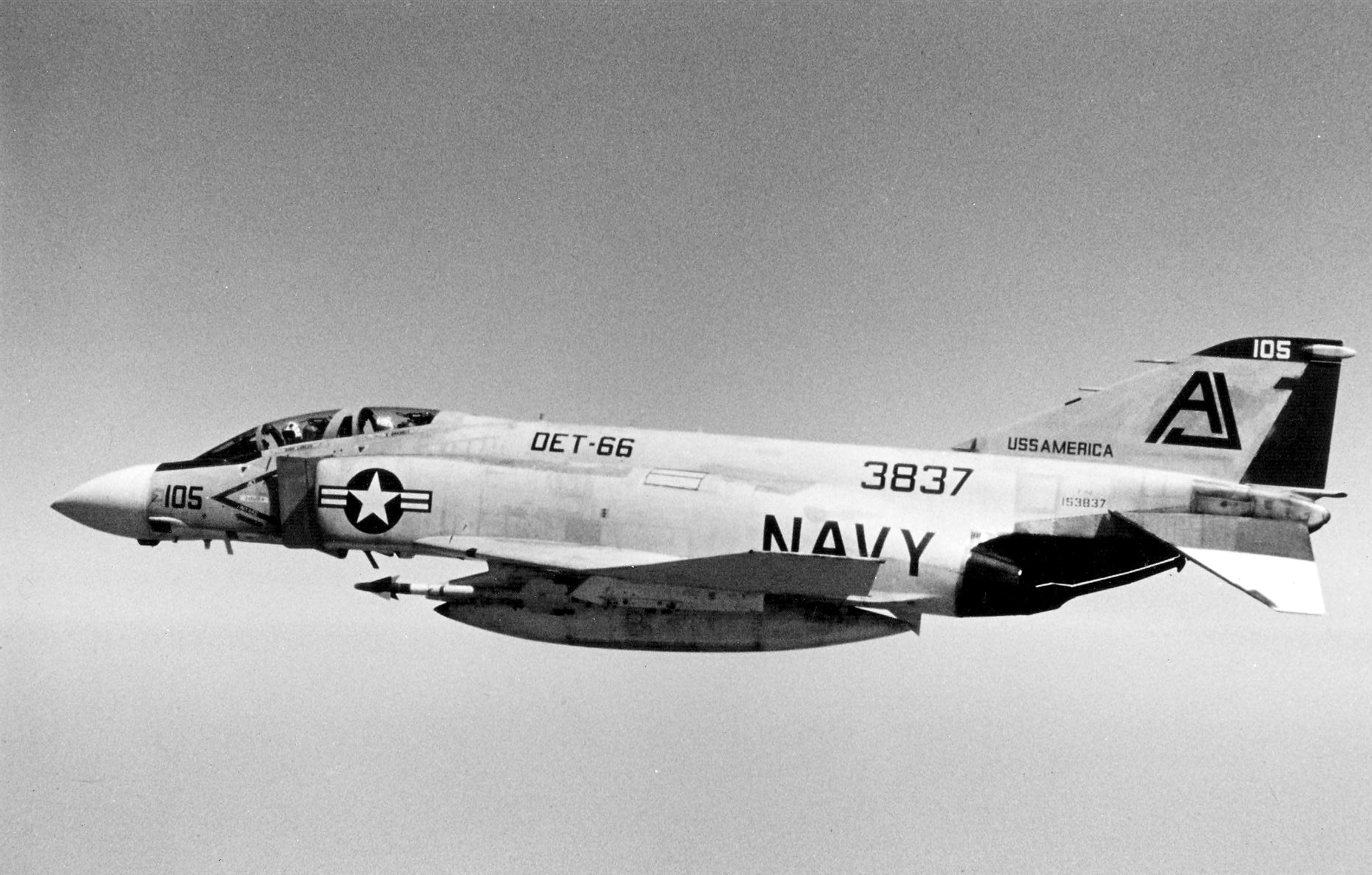
An F-4J of VF-101 Det.66 in 1971

VF-101’s administrative command, Readiness Attack Carrier Air Wing 4, was disestablished on 1 June 1970, with VF-101 shifting control of Command to Fleet Air Key West. This moved lasted only a year, and the squadron moved from NAS Key West to NAS Oceana under the command of Commander Fighter Wing One. A detachment remained at Key West until the 2000s. From 6 July to 16 December 1971, VF-101 Det.66 was assigned to Carrier Air Wing 8 aboard the USS America for a deployment to the Mediterranean Sea.

In January 1976, VF-101 began operating and instructing aircrews and maintainers in the F-14 Tomcat. In 1975 and 1976 the squadron was awarded the CNO Aviation Safety Award and in November 1976 the unit received its fourth Safety Citation due to 36 continuous months without accident. On 5 August 1977, the F-4 training department of VF-101 was split into a separate new squadron, VF-171, which continued to train F-4 crews until disestablishment in 1984 after the last two Oceana F-4 squadrons (VF-74 and VF-103) began to transition to the Tomcat. VF-101 continued to train F-14 crews.

=== 1980s ===
In 1986, VF-101 had completed 3 years of accident free operations earning them another Safety Citation, and in March 1988 they received a third CNO Safety Award. The same year, VF-101 began to receive the F-14A+ (later redesignated F-14B), which upgraded the F-14A's underpowered and troublesome engines with new engines that improved fuel economy and added 14,600 pounds-force (65,000 newtons) of thrust over the F-14A. The new fuel economy gave the F-14B one third more time on-station and sixty percent more range.

=== 1990s ===
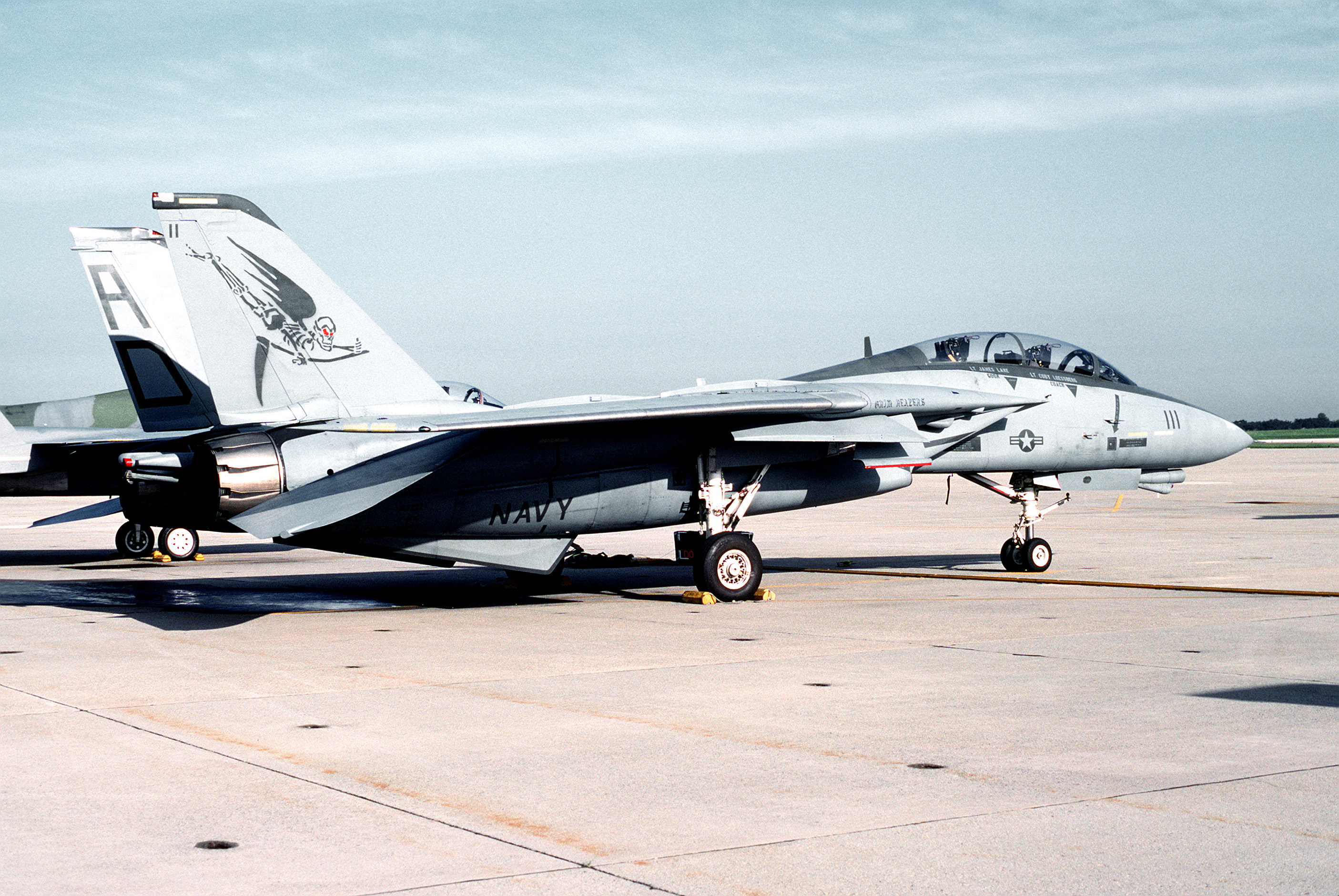
VF-101 F-14B Tomcat

Following a year of dedicated fleet efforts, led primarily by VF-24 at NAS Miramar, California, the first-ever bomb-dropping mission conducted by fleet Tomcats occurred on 8 August 1990 (a joint VF-24/VF-211 division of aircraft). Following that, on 12 September 1990, a VF-101 Tomcat dropped bombs from a "fleet aircraft" for the first time on the east coast. Previously, although initially designed as both a fully capable fighter and strike aircraft, the Tomcat had been assigned strictly to the air-to-air role. Throughout the 1990s and early 2000s, and continuing to build on the earlier groundwork at both VX-4 and the west coast squadrons, VF-101 continued to add to its air-ground weapons training, eventually encompassing a whole range of air-to-ground weapons, from general-purpose bombs, cluster bombs, laser-guided bombs, air-launched decoys, and JDAM.

VF-101's West Coast counterpart, VF-124 at NAS Miramar, was disestablished in 1994, making VF-101 the sole F-14 FRS. A VF-101 detachment was created at Miramar to continue F-14 crews and ground personnel training. When NAS Miramar became Marine Corps Air Station (MCAS) Miramar in 1996, all F-14 squadrons were moved to NAS Oceana and the VF-101 detachment was disestablished. Around this period the squadron also receive their first group of F-14D airplanes, which was the penultimate version of the Tomcat.

=== 2000s ===
As F-14 squadrons began to transition to the F/A-18E/F Super Hornet, VF-101's mission diminished. During this time, several VF-101 aircraft featured the markings of disestablished F-14 squadrons—among them were VF-1, VF-21, VF-24, VF-33, VF-74, VF-84, VF-111 and VF-142. As the only F-14 FRS until its disestablishment in 2005, VF-101 at one point had as many as 130 F-14s of all three variants, as well as a small number of T-34 Mentors for currency training and range safety.

VF-101 was deactivated on 30 September 2005, at a ceremony at NAS Oceana. Honored guests at the ceremony were the surviving members of the Flatley family (three generations of which were VF-101 pilots), who were presented with the squadron flag.

=== Reactivation and redesignation to "VFA-101" as F-35C Fleet Replacement Squadron ===
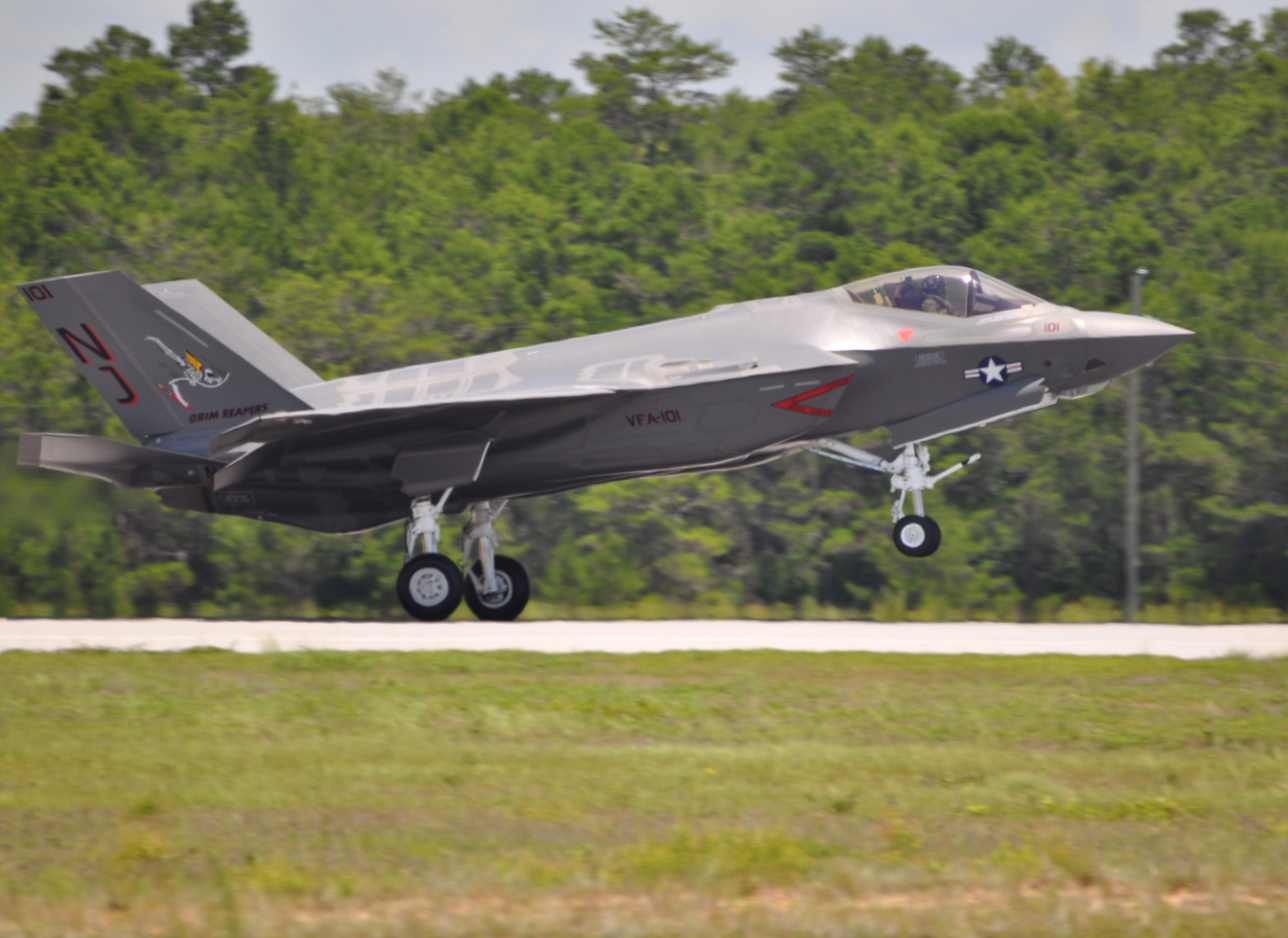
VFA-101 receives its first F-35C at Eglin AFB, 22 June 2013

On 1 May 2012, the squadron was reactivated at Eglin Air Force Base, Florida and redesignated Strike Fighter Squadron 101 (VFA-101), The "Grim Reapers" are still an FRS; this time for the F-35C Lightning II, the aircraft carrier-capable variant of the F-35 that will serve in the U.S. Navy and selected carrier-deployable squadrons of the U.S. Marine Corps. The squadron administratively fell under Commander, Naval Air Forces and Commander Strike Fighter Wing, U.S. Pacific Fleet. In November 2014, VFA-101 passed 1,000 mishap-free flight hours in the F-35C.

=== Deactivation ===
On 10 September 2018, the Chief of Naval Operations promulgated a notice of the "Deactivation of Strike Fighter Squadron One Zero One." . On 23 May 2019, VFA-101 completed deactivation, and was consolidated into the remaining F-35C FRS, VFA-125, the "Rough Raiders". Its assets and support personnel were moved to NAS Lemoore, home of VFA-125.

== See also ==
- Naval aviation
- Carrier-based aircraft
- List of United States Navy aircraft squadrons
- List of Inactive United States Navy aircraft squadrons
