= VF-84 =

Fighter Squadron 84
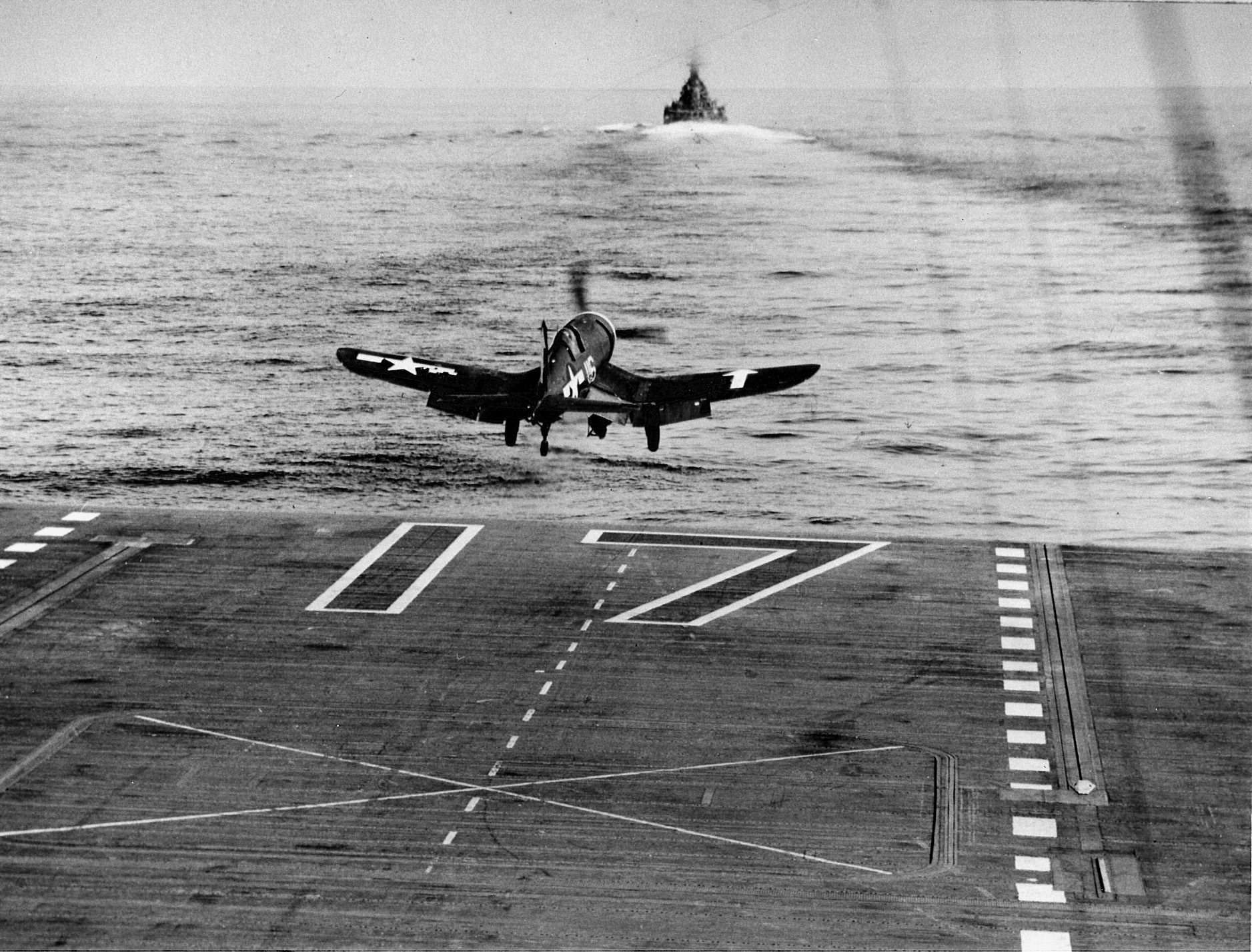
- VF-84 F4U-1D launches from USS Bunker Hill in February 1945
- Active: 1 May 1944 – 8 October 1945
- Country: United States
- Branch: United States Navy
- Type: Fighter
- Nickname(s): Wolf Gang
- Mascot(s): Wolf
- Engagements: World War II

Aircraft flown
- Fighter: F4U Corsair; F6F-5 Hellcat

Fighter Squadron 84 or VF-84 was an aviation unit of the United States Navy. Originally established on 1 May 1944, it was disestablished on 8 October 1945. It was the first US Navy squadron to be designated as VF-84.

== Operational history ==
VF-84 flew F4U Corsairs and was formed around a nucleus of veterans of VF-17, the Jolly Rogers. The new squadron's commanding officer was Lt. Cdr. Roger R. Hedrick, former executive officer of VF-17.

VF-84 was assigned to the USS Bunker Hill, which was the former home of VF-17. As part of Task Force 58, the carrier and Carrier Air Group 84 (CVG-84) participated in the final drive across the central Pacific. Roger Hedrick was promoted to head CVG-84 on the combat loss of the air group's commanding officer, and Lt. Cdr. Raymond "Ted" Hill took over the fighter squadron.

VF-84 took part in the invasion of Iwo Jima; raids on Tokyo and other targets in Japan; the discovery and sinking of the Japanese battleship Yamato and support of the invasion of Okinawa, including combat air patrol over the invasion fleet to defend against Kamikaze attack, ground support, and combat air patrol over targets on Okinawa.

On 11 May 1945, while off Okinawa, two Japanese kamikazes struck the Bunker Hill in quick succession, with a bomb penetrating to the pilots' ready room, killing 22 members of VF-84. Both the Bunker Hill (then the TF-58 flagship) and CAG-84 were knocked out of the war. Although VF-84 was reformed in July 1945 as an F6F Hellcat squadron, the war ended while it was still in training. While in the Pacific, VF-84 was credited with 92 kills for a loss of four aircraft and nine of the squadron's pilots became aces.

== See also ==
- VF-84 (1955-95)
- History of the United States Navy
- List of inactive United States Navy aircraft squadrons

== Sources ==
- Irons, Martin. Corsair Down!. Atglen, Pennsylvania: Schiffer Publishing Ltd., 2022. ISBN 978-0-7643-6224-8
- Jacobs, Jan; Tillman, Barrett (August 1990), "The Wolf Gang: A History of Carrier Air Group 84", The Hook, 18 (WWII special issue): 78–87.
- Popp, Wilbert (2003). The Survivor of a WWII Navy Pilot. Privately published.
- Tillman, Barrett (1997). U.S. Navy Fighter Squadrons in World War II. Specialty Press. p. 100-1. ISBN 0933424744.
