= John Thomas Blackburn =

American naval aviator and commanding officer (1912–1994)

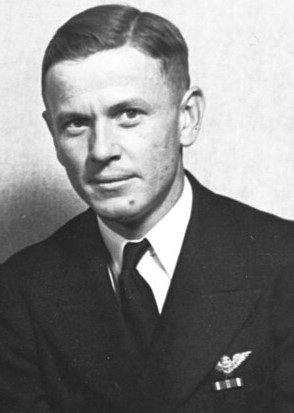
- John Blackburn, c. 1944
- Born: January 24, 1912; Annapolis, Maryland
- Died: March 21, 1994 (aged 82); Jacksonville, Florida
- Burial place: Arlington National Cemetery
- Military career
- Allegiance: United States
- Branch: United States Navy
- Service years: 1929–1962
- Rank: Captain
- Nickname: "Tommy"
- Commands: VGF-29; VF-17 Jolly Rogers; Air Group-74; Heavy Attack Wing 1 USS Midway
- Conflicts: World War II: Operation Torch; Guadalcanal Campaign; Landings at Cape Torokina
- Awards: Navy Cross; Distinguished Flying Cross

John Thomas "Tom" Blackburn (January 24, 1912 – March 21, 1994) was an American naval aviator, World War II flying ace, and the first commanding officer of the famed F4U Corsair squadron VF-17 Jolly Rogers. In 1970, Grumman named its carrier-capable, supersonic F-14 fighter jet the "Tomcat" in part to honor Blackburn's contributions to Naval aviation in WW II. (See Awards and Decorations below.)

== Early life ==
John Thomas Blackburn was born in Annapolis, Maryland, to Captain Paul P. Blackburn, Sr. and Nell Carey, of Omaha, Nebraska, who raised him in Washington, D.C., where he graduated from Western High School. He had an older brother, Vice Admiral Paul P. "Brick" Blackburn, Jr. and a younger sister, Elinor Carey Blackburn. John Thomas Blackburn's father and brother also played significant roles in WW II and the Vietnam War. (See Family and Later Years below.)

== Navy career ==
Blackburn graduated from the United States Naval Academy in 1933, where he played water polo. He trained as a Naval Aviator and became a flight instructor in 1941 when the United States entered World War II.

Lieutenant Commander Blackburn was anxious to get into combat, but was relegated to flying the Brewster F2A Buffalo at Opa Locka Naval Air Station, near Miami.

=== First command, VGF-29 ===
After several requests for a combat assignment, he received orders in July 1942 to organize VGF-29 as commanding officer and report aboard the new escort carrier USS Santee. VGF-29 was equipped with the Grumman F4F-4 Wildcat. Blackburn assembled a ready room of mainly brand new ensigns fresh from winning their wings at advanced flying school at Naval Air Station Corpus Christi. Luckily he had the assistance of a combat veteran from the recent Battle of the Coral Sea, Lt.(jg) Harry "Brink" Bass who received the Navy Cross for his attack on the Japanese aircraft carrier Shōhō.

Blackburn set up operations at a remote field at Pungo, Virginia, well away from the brass and traffic at NAS Norfolk and was soon promoted to Lieutenant Commander. Pungo suited Blackburn fine as he wanted an undisturbed environment to get the squadron acquainted with the Wildcat and ready for deployment and the combat likely to follow.

The squadron embarked aboard USS Santee in October 1942 to participate in Operation Torch, the Allied invasion of North Africa. Arriving in the waters off Morocco on November 6, VGF-29 flew first combat mission on 8 November but could not find their target, and poor weather and damaged homing equipment aboard Santee forced them to ditch or force-land their Wildcats. Blackburn floated adrift in a life raft for three days before he was spotted by a destroyer and rescued. Thus ended VGF-29's inauspicious debut and Blackburn's first combat deployment. Shortly thereafter, Blackburn was ordered to stand up a new squadron.

=== The Jolly Rogers, VF-17 ===
Blackburn stood up VF-17 on January 1, 1943, at NAS Norfolk. It initially had a few North American SNJ trainers and F4F Wildcats awaiting delivery of the first Vought F4U Corsairs in February. It was the second Navy fighter squadron to receive the F4U-1 Corsair, the first to fly them in combat, and the most successful of them all during a combat tour in the Solomon Islands. Blackburn wanted to motivate his pilots with a squadron insignia which would live up to the Corsair name and chose the skull and crossbones and the name "The Jolly Rogers". Harry Hollmeyer, as squadron pilot conceived the original design, which was painted on the cowling of the Corsairs that were also known as "hogs." As squadron leader, Blackburn gave himself the name "Big Hog," which was painted on the side of his plane.

Together with his executive officer, Roger Hedrick, Blackburn embarked on an intensive training program to get his squadron ready for the planned deployment to the Pacific in August 1943, and the combat that lay ahead. Again, he chose a remote field well away from Norfolk to operate as he saw fit and away from prying eyes of the senior leadership.

The squadron deployed aboard USS Bunker Hill and worked hard to adapt the F4U Corsair to the carrier environment, which necessitated some design changes, resulting in the F4U-1A model.

The Jolly Rogers deployed to the Pacific, but upon arrival there the Navy decided to initially land base its Corsairs. The squadron flew to Guadalcanal on October 26 where it received orders to begin operating out of Ondongo (which means "Place of Death") on the island of New Georgia in the Solomon Islands. They arrived on the 27th, just in time to participate in providing air cover for the Landings at Cape Torokina, near Empress Augusta Bay on Bougainville Island on 1 November; this drew attention from the considerable Japanese presence at their bastion of Rabaul. Blackburn and his Jolly Rogers were assigned the high cover mission for the landings and ran into a wave of Japanese Aichi D3A "Val" dive bombers escorted by Mitsubishi A6M Zero fighters. Blackburn downed two and the squadron three more in their combat debut.

On November 8, 1943, The Jolly Rogers faced their biggest test to date when six Jolly Rogers faced an attack of 15 Japanese D3A "Val" dive bombers escorted by 24 A6M "Zeros". Hedrick launched with a flight of eight Corsairs, but two aborted. In the engagement, VF-17 downed three fighters and damaged four others with no losses. In its two tours of duty in the Solomon Islands, VF-17 had 152 aerial victories and produced 11 aces. Blackburn ranked third with 11 victories behind Hedrick with 12 and Ira Kepford who led the squadron with 17. VF-17 finished its last combat tour in the Solomons on May 10, 1944, and many pilots were reassigned.

Cdr. Blackburn led VF-17 (January 1943 – May 1944) to become the greatest fighter squadron with confirmed 154 enemy kills (an 8:1 loss ratio) plus 75 probable kills. They sank five transport ships and barges. No plane they escorted was ever shot down, not even in flights against Rabaul. In 76 days of combat they flew 8577 combat hours and produced 13 flying aces. Forty years later, his pilots publicly credited the squadron's skipper for its success; he taught them much and was successful in getting equipment and supplies they needed. A series of interviews with former pilots and ground crew of VF-17, including Tommy Blackburn and fighter ace Ike Kepford, was held and videotaped at the Glenview Naval Air Station in Glenview, Il in 1984. That recording is still available on DVD from RDR Productions in Glenview, IL.

=== Aerial victories ===
Date	Credits	Aircraft types claimed (location)
1 Nov 1943	2	A6M "Zeke" destr. (Empress Augusta Bay, Bougainville Island)
8 Nov 1943	1	Light Transport destr. (Buka aerodrome, Buka Island)
11 Nov 1943	1	Ki-61 "Tony" destr. (Battle of the Solomon Sea)
26 Jan 1944	1	A6M "Zeke" destr. (Rabaul, New Britain)
30 Jan 1944	2	A6M "Zeke" destr. (Rabaul, New Britain)
6 Feb 1944	4	A6M "Zeke" destr. (Rabaul, New Britain)
	11	

=== USS Midway ===
In 1945, Blackburn became CAG (Commander, Air Group) of Carrier Air Group 74 (CVBG-74) aboard the newly commissioned aircraft carrier USS Midway (CVB-41), shortly before V-J Day. In 1958-1959, he commanded the Midway. During his command of the USS Midway, Blackburn successfully turned the carrier around under the Golden Gate Bridge during a storm on the San Francisco Bay.

=== Shore duty ===
After World War II he worked at the Pentagon.

Commander Blackburn was an early jet pilot in the Navy. He flew a Bell YP-59A Airacomet at Naval Air Test Center, Patuxent, on 13 May 1946, the 120th American naval aviator qualified to fly a jet airplane.

While commanding HATWING-1, Captain Blackburn participated in a demonstration of carrier mobility. On 3 September 1956, he and his wingman each flew a Douglas A3D Skywarrior from the USS Shangri-La (CV-38), off the coast of Oregon, across a finish line at the National Air Show in Oklahoma City, and on to Jacksonville, Florida, without refueling.

== Retirement ==
John Thomas "Tommy" Blackburn retired from the Navy in 1962 and began to use the name Tom Blackburn.

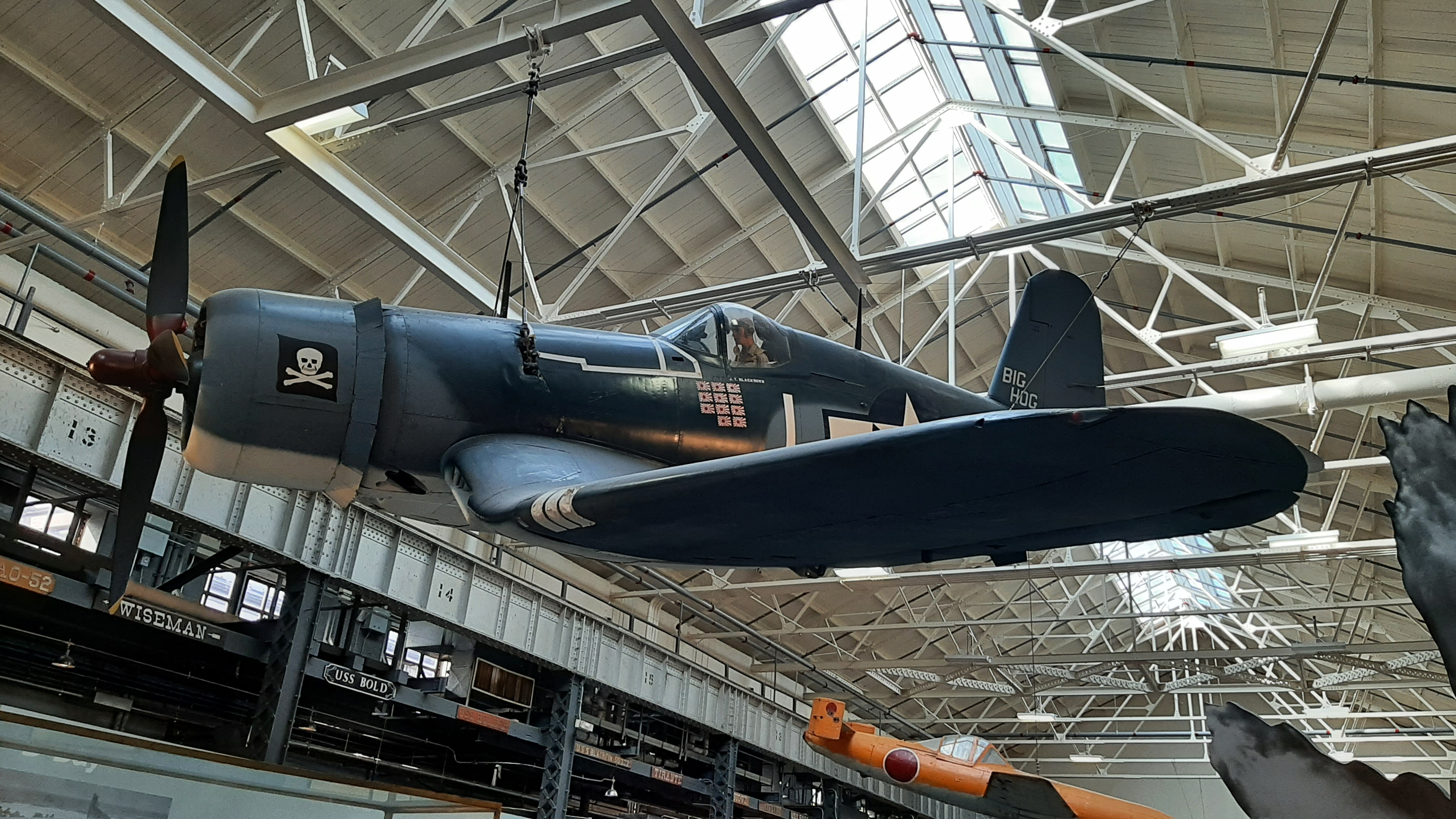
The replica of Blackburn's F4U Corsair

In mid-1962, Blackburn bought land on the Silverado Trail in St. Helena, California. There, he created Casa Nuestra Vineyard and began growing wine grapes, which he sold to the Charles Krug Winery, which was owned and operated by Robert Mondavi, for whom Blackburn wrote about the process of making wine. At the vineyard, Tom Blackburn raised "blue ribbon" Golden Retrievers. In 1975, Blackburn sold his St. Helena, California, vineyard and home to Gene and Cody Kirkham, who transformed the property into Casa Nuestra Winery, which produces excellent wine, including a Reisling from grapes Blackburn planted in the 1970's.

== Family and Later Years ==
With his first wife, Rosalie Sanderlin Reed, a Smith College graduate from Washington, DC, Tom Blackburn had two children, Mark Weld Blackburn in 1937 and Patricia "Pattie" Anne Blackburn in 1940. After graduating from Yale University, Mark Blackburn married Jennifer. The couple had two children, Nicholas and Lissa. Pattie Blackburn graduated from Smith College and married John William Soggs of Utica, New York. Pattie gave birth to Leslie Reed Soggs (1963), to Randolph Blackburn Soggs (1966) and to Sarah Ruth Soggs (1969). Blackburn has ten great-grandchildren: through his son, Mark: Alexander and Amy; and through his daughter, Pattie: by granddaughter Leslie Reed (née Soggs): Charlotte Rosalie Reed (1996) and Morgain Elizabeth Ann Reed (1998); by grandson Randolph Blackburn Soggs: Katherine Soggs (1999), Jillian Soggs (2000), and Jackson Soggs (2005); and by granddaughter Sarah Soggs: Benjamin Soggs Wolf (1998), Finneus Beager Wolf (2000), and Abigail Soggs Wolf (2002).

When he sold the vineyard in 1975, Tom Blackburn moved to Jacksonville, Florida. There he became reacquainted with and married Jamie Brashears, widow of Admiral Brashears, a WW II friend. Jamie supported him in writing his WW II memoir, The Jolly Rogers: The Story of Tom Blackburn and Navy Fighting Squadron VF-17 published by Penguin in 1990. Based on this memoir, a documentary film called Fighting 17: The Jolly Rodgers was made including in depth interviews with Tom Blackburn and his squadron members, the documentary became available in 2026 through The American Hero Film Series.

John Thomas Blackburn died in Jacksonville, Florida in March 1994. His obituary appeared in the New York Times, and he was buried at Arlington National Cemetery.

== Recognition, Awards and Decorations ==
A replica of Blackburn's F4U Corsair (photo above), with the Jolly Roger insignia and "Big Hog" written on the vertical stabilizer and the number one on the fuselage, was installed at the Washington Navy Yard in 1985.

In December 1970, aircraft manufacturer (Northrup) Grumman issued its F-14 fighter jet, giving it the nickname the "Tomcat" partially to pay homage to Captain John Thomas Blackburn's flying record and to his contribution to the development of naval aviation during WW II. The name also pays tribute to Vice Admiral Thomas F. Connolly, who contributed to the plane's development.

The F-14 "Tomcat" features as the rescue plane for Tom Cruise and Miles Teller's characters in the 2022 film Top Gun: Maverick. Blackburn's Jolly Rodgers squadron is also memorialized in the animated movies Planes as a fictional version of the squadron, the “Jolly Wrenches,” which uses the same livery, but the crossbones are replaced by wrenches.

In New Hartford, New York, the town where Blackburn's daughter Pattie raised her children, his son-in-law built a street called "Blackburn Court" in honor of Tom Blackburn.

Naval Awards + Decorations

Captain John Thomas Blackburn's Naval awards and decorations include:

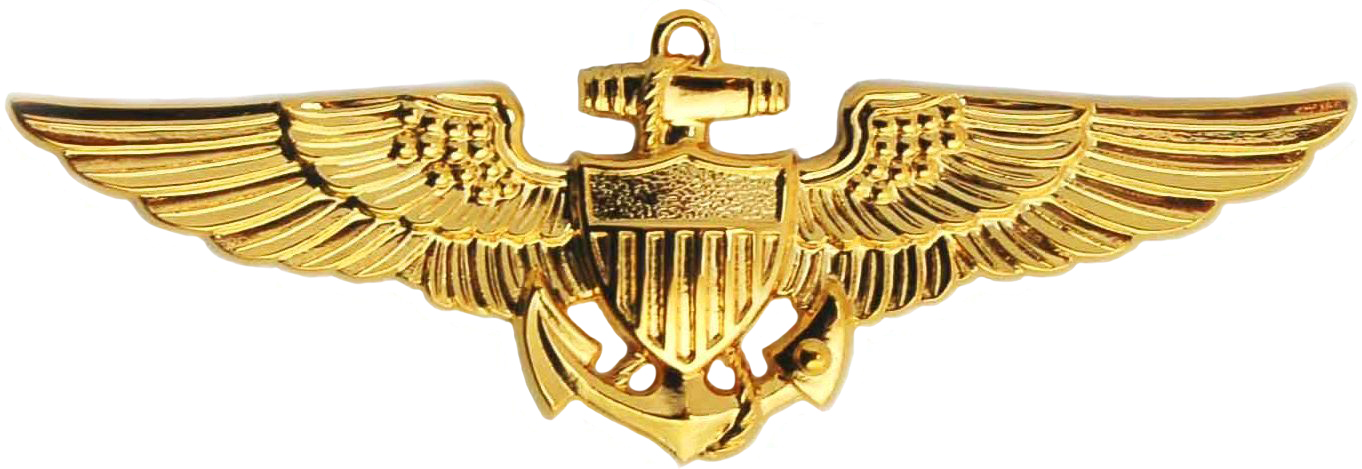

Naval Aviator Badge
Navy Cross	Distinguished Flying Cross	Combat Action Ribbon
American Defense Service Medal w/ "A" Device	American Campaign Medal	European–African–Middle Eastern Campaign Medal w/ one 3/16" bronze star
Asiatic-Pacific Campaign Medal w/ two 3/16" bronze stars	World War II Victory Medal	National Defense Service Medal

=== Navy Cross citation ===

Lieutenant Commander John Thomas Blackburn
U.S. Navy

The President of the United States of America takes pleasure in presenting the Navy Cross to Lieutenant Commander John Thomas Blackburn, United States Navy, for extraordinary heroism in operations against the enemy while serving as Pilot of a carrier-based Navy Fighter Plane in Fighting Squadron Seventeen (VF-17), attached to the U.S.S. Hornet (CV-12), while participating in aerial flights against the enemy in the New Britain theater. In thirty-two days Lieutenant Commander Blackburn flew thirty combat sorties, twenty-one of which were escort missions or fighter sweeps over the Rabaul area, and on thirteen of which he encountered enemy aircraft. On 26 January, when the bombers which he was escorting were intercepted by more than fifty enemy fighters, he destroyed one of them. On 30 January the light bombers he escorted were aggressively intercepted by twenty enemy fighters. In repeated attacks he destroyed two of them and probably shot down three more. On 9 February he led a flight of eight Corsairs which found an enemy ship at anchor and sank it with machine gun fire. His outstanding devotion to duty, his heroic conduct against numerically superior enemy forces, his daring and aggressive airmanship were in keeping with the highest traditions of the United States Naval Service.

== Bibliography ==
- 1989: The Jolly Rogers: The story of Tom Blackburn and Navy Fighting Squadron VF-17. – New York: Orion Books. – ISBN 978-0-517-57075-3.
- Blackburn, Tom with Eric M. Hammel (1997). The Jolly Rogers : the story of Tom Blackburn and Navy Fighting Squadron VF-17. Pacifica, CA: Pacifica Press. ISBN 0-935553-19-3. LCCN 96042244.
- Styling, Mark (1995). Corsair Aces of World War 2. Osprey Publishing.
- Cook, Lee. The Skull & Crossbones Squadron: VF-17 in World War II.
