= VFA-103 =

Strike Fighter Squadron 103
- Active: 1 May 1952 - Present
- Country: United States
- Branch: United States Navy
- Type: Fighter/Attack
- Role: Close air support Air interdiction Aerial reconnaissance
- Part of: Carrier Air Wing Seven
- Garrison/HQ: NAS Oceana
- Nickname: Jolly Rogers
- Motto: "Fear the Bones."
- Mascot: Ensign Jack "Bones" Ernie
- Engagements: 1958 Lebanon crisis Vietnam War; Achille Lauro hijacking Action in the Gulf of Sidra (1986); Operation El Dorado Canyon; Operation Desert Shield; Operation Desert Storm; Operation Southern Watch; Operation Enduring Freedom; Operation Iraqi Freedom; Operation Inherent Resolve; Operation Epic Fury
- Decorations: Safety "S"; Mutha Fighter Spirit Award 2005, 2007, 2011, 2013; Battle Efficiency "E", 2006, 2007; Wade McClusky Award, 2007; Golden Wrench Maintenance Award 2006; Golden Anchor Retention Award 2006
- Website: https://www.airlant.usff.navy.mil/vfa103/

Commanders
- Commanding Officer: CMD. Jonathan Gilliom
- Executive Officer: CMD. William E. Dann
- Command Master Chief: CMDCM Bradley L. Wissinger

Insignia
- Callsign: Victory

Aircraft flown
- Fighter: FG-1D Corsair (1952); F9F-6/8B Cougar (1952–1957; F-8A/C/E Crusader (1957–1965); F-4B/J/S Phantom II(1964–1983); F-14A/B Tomcat(1983–2004); F/A-18F Super Hornet (2004 – present); F/A-18E Super Hornet (2024 – present)

Strike Fighter Squadron 103 (VFA-103), nicknamed the Jolly Rogers, is an aviation unit of the United States Navy established in 1952. VFA-103 flies the Boeing F/A-18E/F Super Hornet and is based at Naval Air Station Oceana, Virginia (US). The squadron's radio callsign is Victory and it is assigned to Carrier Air Wing Seven.

== Insignia and nicknames ==
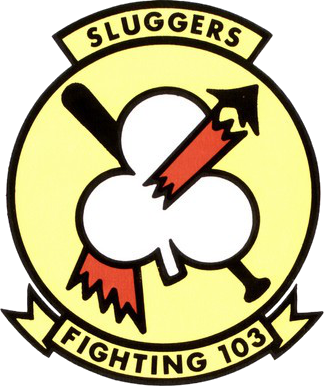
VF-103 "Sluggers" original insignia.

The original VF-103 squadron insignia was a cloverleaf, and the aircraft tailfins had a horizontal yellow arrow outlined in black. Later a stylized aircraft darting through the leaf was added, along with a baseball bat. The baseball bat stemmed from an early skipper who often carried one with him. In 1991, VF-103's aircraft used the squadron insignia for tail-art, in place of the bold arrow. When the Sluggers became the Jolly Rogers following the disestablishment of VF-84 (1955–95), they adopted the famous white skull-and-crossbones.

The Jolly Rogers have always displayed some of the most recognizable squadron markings in the world: sinister white skull-and-crossbones on all-black tails, with gold bands wrapped around the tip of the tail fins, and black bands with gold chevrons (known as vagabonds strips from the Crusader days of VF-84) run down the sides of the forward fuselage.

== History ==
Three distinct U.S. Naval Aviation squadrons have used the name and insignia of the Jolly Roger: VF-17/VF-5B/VF-61, VF-84 and VF-103/VFA-103. While these are distinctly different squadrons that have no lineal linkage, they all share the same Jolly Roger name, the skull and crossbones insignia and traditions. After disestablishment of VF-84 in 1995, the Jolly Rogers name and insignia were adopted by VF-103, which later became VFA-103, the subject of this article. There has been only one squadron designated VF-103.

=== 1950s ===
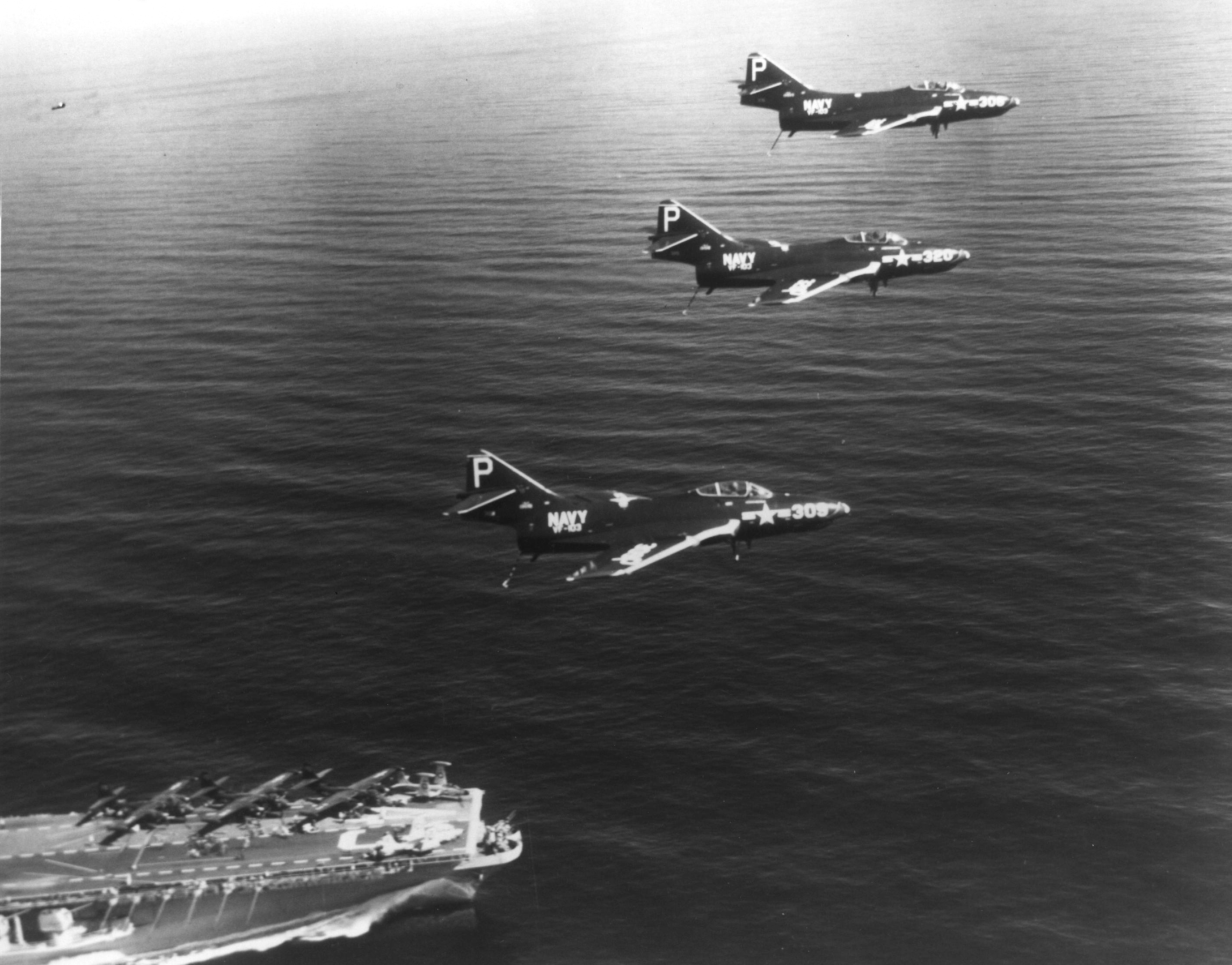
VF-103 F9F-6 Cougars over USS Coral Sea, 1954.

VF-103 (the "Sluggers") were activated on 1 May 1952 and equipped with the FG-1D Corsair. The squadron was assigned to Carrier Air Group 10 (CVG-10) and made a short cruise aboard USS Lake Champlain in late 1952. Thereafter, VF-103 transitioned to the F9F-6 Cougar and adopted the nickname "Flying Cougars". CVG-10 went aboard USS Randolph for her shakedown cruise following her reactivation to the Caribbean between August and November 1953. The air group was then reassigned to USS Coral Sea and VF-103 was equipped with the F9F-8B. The carrier was deployed to the Mediterranean Sea between August 1956 and February 1957. This was the last time that VF-103 operated from a straight-deck carrier.

In 1957, VF-103 was one of the first squadrons to transition to the supersonic F8U-1 Crusader, and was renamed "Sluggers". Once the transition was completed they were teamed up with VF-102 on board USS Forrestal. Prior to the introduction of the Crusader jets, U.S. Navy carrier battle groups were often embarrassed by British bombers during allied exercises as the RAF English Electric Canberras had always been able to make mock attacks on U.S. carriers with impunity. At the time, the U.S. fighters simply could not put up much resistance. During the 1958 Mediterranean cruise, British pilots were surprised when VF-103 tore through their formation of Canberras before they even had a chance to start their simulated attack.

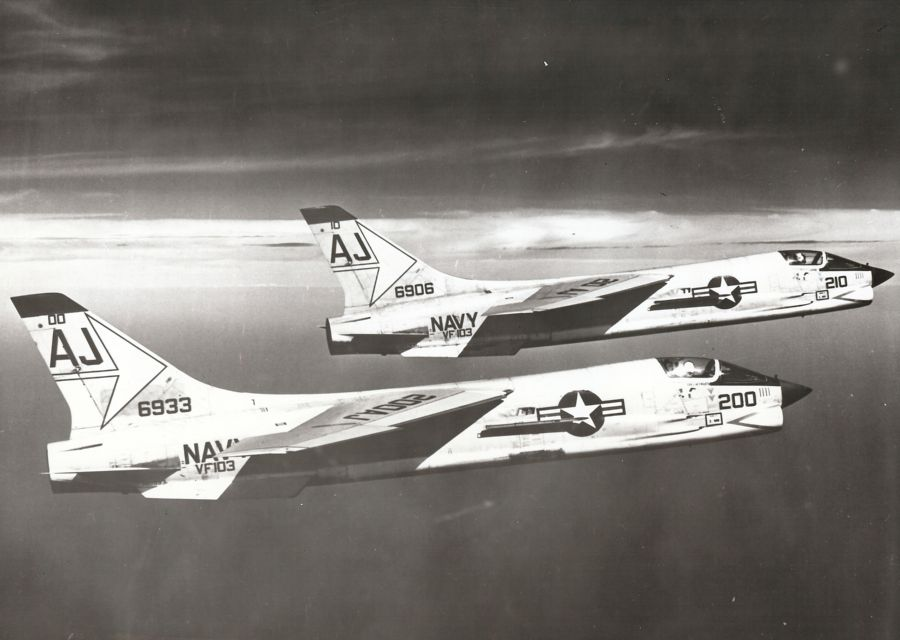
VF-103 F8U-2s from USS Forrestal

USS Forrestal and VF-103 were deployed to the Mediterranean Sea during the 1958 Lebanon crisis but the crisis had abated before the carrier reached its station. A regular deployment followed between September 1958 and March 1959. Future astronaut John W. Young was a squadron member during this cruise.

=== 1960s ===
VF-103 was reequipped with the F8U-2 (F-8C after 1962) and reassigned to CVG-8, although still assigned to USS Forrestal. Three other deployments to the Mediterranean followed in 1960, 1961 and 1964–1965. The squadron was reequipped with the F-8E in 1964. The 1964–1965 cruise was significant, as VF-103 flew both the F-8E and the newly introduced F-4B Phantom II. VF-103 would fly the Phantom for 19 years. From 1965 to 1980, VF-103 was assigned to Carrier Air Wing 3 (CVW-3). Even longer was the assignment to USS Saratoga, from 1965 to 1994, since 1984 as part of CVW-17. VF-103 was aboard Saratoga for 15 deployments to the Mediterranean Sea, plus a single one aboard Forrestal in 1982.

VF-103 flew the F-4B until transitioning to the F-4J in 1968. In 1981, the squadron was reequipped with the F-4S.

=== 1970s ===
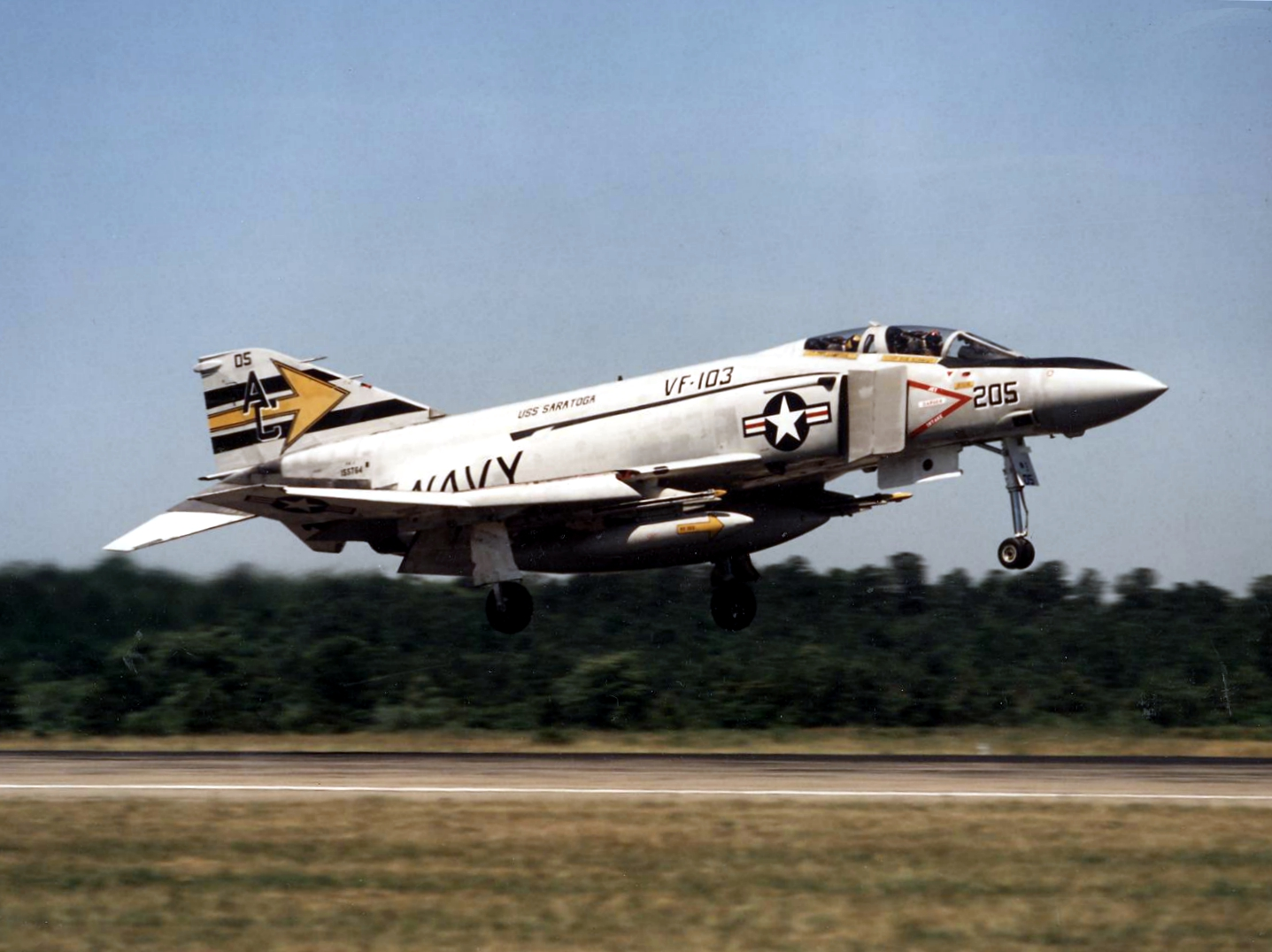
VF-103 F-4J Phantom II in 1978

When North Vietnam launched its Easter Offensive invasion of South Vietnam, USS Saratoga was deployed to the coast of Vietnam to participate in Operation Linebacker. On 10 August 1972, Lieutenant Commander Robert Tucker and Lieutenant Junior Grade Stanley Edens shot down a Mikoyan-Gurevich MiG-21 with an AIM-7 Sparrow missile during a night interception. It was the first night MiG kill using the Sparrow.

=== 1980s ===
In January 1983, VF-103 was among the last fighter squadrons to transition to the F-14A Tomcat. The squadron conducted the first East Coast fighter squadron's low altitude AIM-54 Phoenix missile shoot a month later. In October 1985, VF-103 and VF-74 participated in the interception of the Egyptian Boeing 737 carrying the Achille Lauro hijackers. During a long range night intercept by VF-74 and VF-103, the 737 was forced to land at Naval Air Station Sigonella, Sicily. The terrorists were taken into Italian custody, tried and sentenced.

VF-103 and the rest of the airwing participated in Operation Attain Document and Operation El Dorado Canyon in the spring of 1986.

In 1989, VF-103 transitioned to the F-14A+ (later redesignated F-14B).

=== 1990s ===
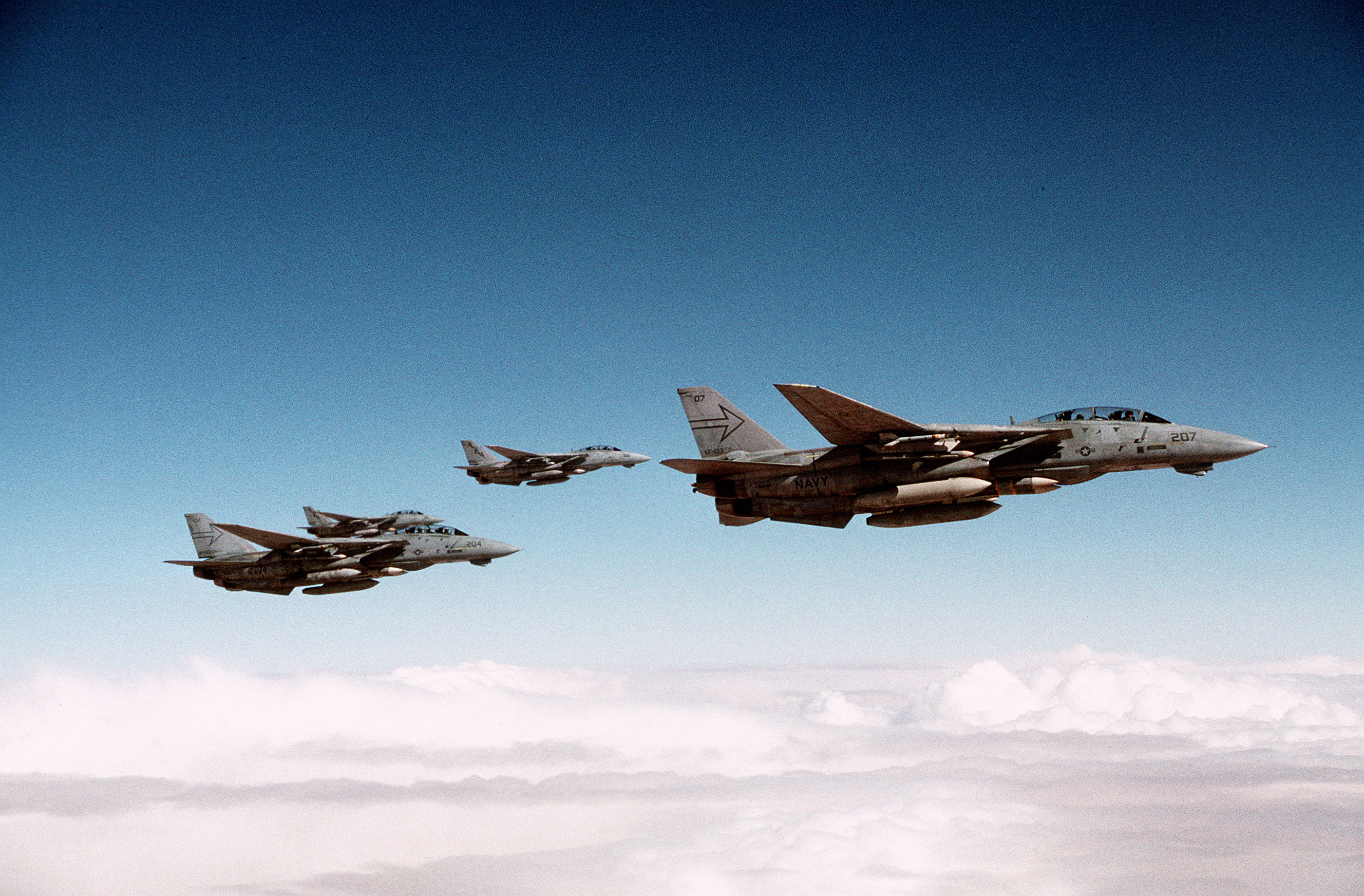
VF-103 F-14A+ Tomcats en route to Iraq while flying off Saratoga during the Gulf War.

In August 1990 when Kuwait was invaded by Iraq, USS Saratoga was in the Mediterranean and soon joined USS Dwight D. Eisenhower in the Red Sea. VF-84 was part of the USS Theodore Roosevelt (CVN-71) Battle Group during Operation Desert Shield and Desert Storm. VF-103 and VF-74 worked together to develop the fighter tactics which were used during the Gulf War. When the war started in January 1991, VF-103 conducted fighter escort for the air wing's strike packages, reconnaissance and bomb damage assessment and combat air patrols. On the fourth day of the war, while on an escort mission, a VF-103 F-14A+ was shot down by what is believed to be an SA-2 "Guideline" surface-to-air missile. After ejecting from his aircraft, the Radar Intercept Officer, Lieutenant Larry Slade, was captured by Iraqi troops and held in Baghdad as a POW until the end of the war. The pilot, Lieutenant Devon Jones, was able to evade capture and, after eight hours deep in enemy territory, was rescued by USAF Special Operations Forces.

On 1 October 1995, VF-84 was disestablished bringing an end to the Jolly Rogers. Not wanting the Jolly Rogers insignia to fade away from U.S. Naval Aviation, VF-103 requested to do away with their "Slugger" moniker and adopt the Jolly Rogers name and insignia that had been previously used by VF-84.

Also in 1995, VF-103 conducted the fleet feasibility testing of the U.S. Air Force's LANTIRN targeting pod in a rapid prototyping initiative that led to adoption of the LANTIRN for the Tomcat community. When they deployed with USS Enterprise in the summer of 1996, VF-103 became the first Tomcat squadron to introduce the LANTIRN targeting pod to operational service. The LANTIRN radically improved the F-14's strike capabilities by providing an autonomous precision strike capability.

In 1997 VF-103 transferred from USS Enterprise to USS Dwight D. Eisenhower, and set sail to former Yugoslavia in June 1998 in support of NATO operations in Kosovo. In November, the carrier moved to the Persian Gulf in response to aggressive Iraqi posturing.

=== 2000s ===
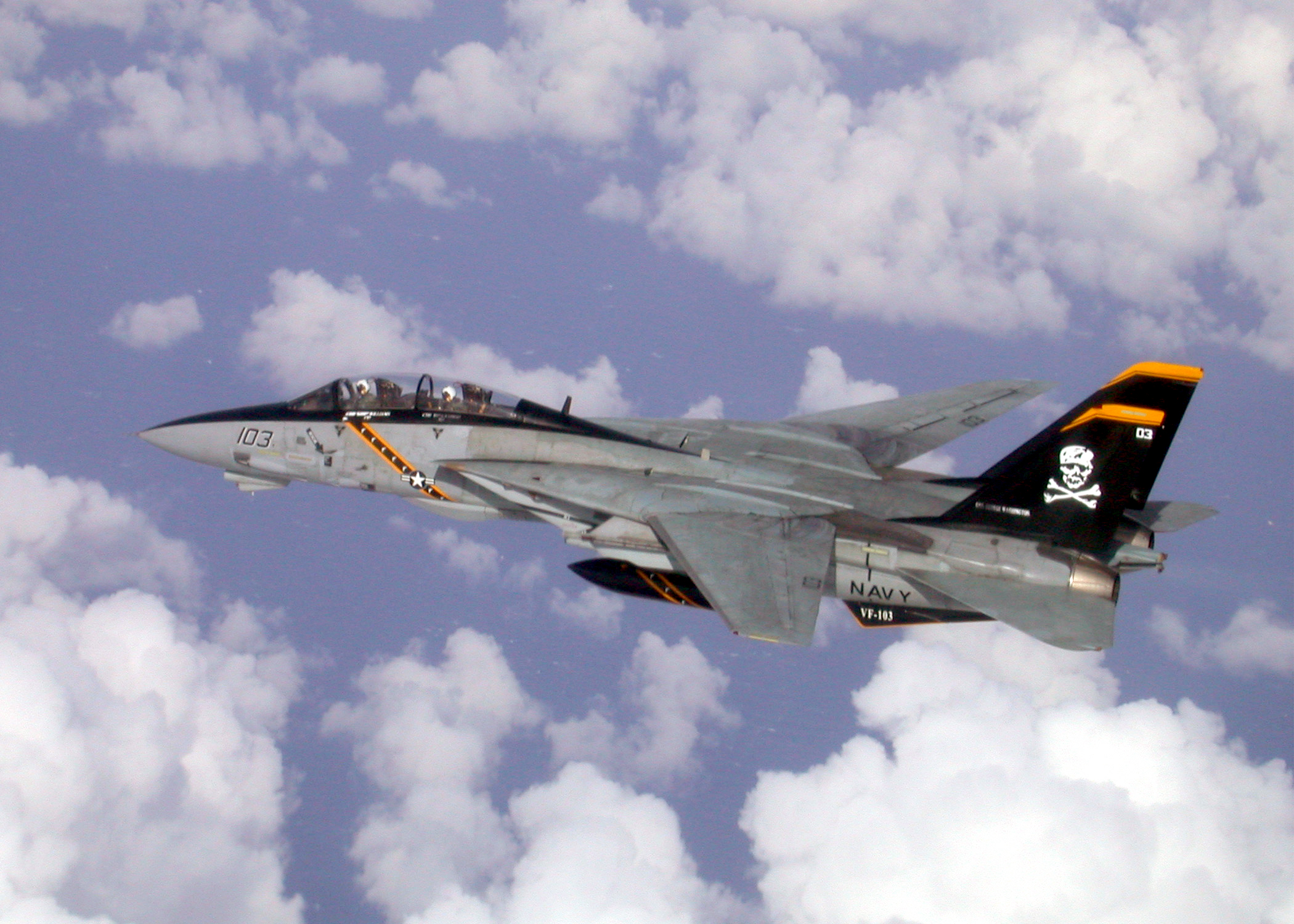
VF-103 F-14B in high visibility markings

In June 2002, VF-103 and its carrier USS George Washington deployed to the North Arabian Sea and the Persian Gulf and participated in Operation Enduring Freedom and Operation Southern Watch. VF-103 supported Coalition forces in Afghanistan flying Close Air Support, Forward Air Controller and TARPS missions. VF-103 was already on their way home by the start of Operation Iraqi Freedom in early 2003.

VF-103 returned to the Persian Gulf for its final Tomcat cruise with USS John F. Kennedy on 10 July 2004 and ten days later the squadron bombed an insurgent position. The unit participated in Operation Phantom Fury in October 2004 to provide aerial support over Fallujah for the 1st Marine Expeditionary Force and Iraqi Army soldiers. During one mission an F-14 from VF-103 provided laser designation for an AH-1W Super Cobra helicopter's AGM-114 Hellfire missile to destroy a building where insurgents had taken cover. This operation had never previously been attempted with a Hellfire, but the missile successfully hit the building, neutralizing the enemy fire that the US troops were receiving. The F-14 crew was ordered to two drop additional GBU-12 laser-guided bombs on the building, leveling the structure. During another mission, air support was requested for Marines fighting on the ground. An F-14 from VF-103 provided close air support and suffered a ruptured hydraulic line. The F-14 declared an in flight emergency and landed without incident at Al Asad Air Base. Repairs took a few days on the base as the starboard engine had to be removed and later the crew flew the F-14 back to the John F. Kennedy.

After a last deployment USS John F. Kennedy with CVW-17 and returning to NAS Oceana in December 2004, VF-103 retired their F-14B Tomcats and began transition to the F/A-18F Super Hornet and transfer to Carrier Air Wing Seven (CVW-7). Following their transition to the F/A-18F, the squadron was officially re-designated as VFA-103 in February 2005.

The first deployment with the F/A-18F commenced in 2006 and ended in the spring of 2007. During the cruise with USS Dwight D. Eisenhower, VFA-103 and VFA-143 supported Operations Iraqi Freedom, Enduring Freedom and operations off the Somali coast, and combined with VFA-131 and VFA-83, they dropped 140 precision guided weapons and performed nearly 70 strafing runs. For their outstanding performance on this deployment, VFA-103 was awarded the AIRLANT Battle "E" for both 2006 & 2007, as well as the Wade McClusky Award as the best Attack Squadron in the US Navy for 2007.

VFA-103 temporarily embarked with CVW-17 in 2008 as USS George Washington sailed to the Pacific Ocean to replace USS Kitty Hawk in Japan. On 21 February 2009 VFA-103 and CVW-7 embarked aboard USS Dwight D. Eisenhower for a deployment supporting Operation Enduring Freedom and maritime security operations in the Persian Gulf. On 30 July 2009, USS Dwight D. Eisenhower returned to Naval Station Norfolk after almost a six-month deployment.

=== 2010s ===
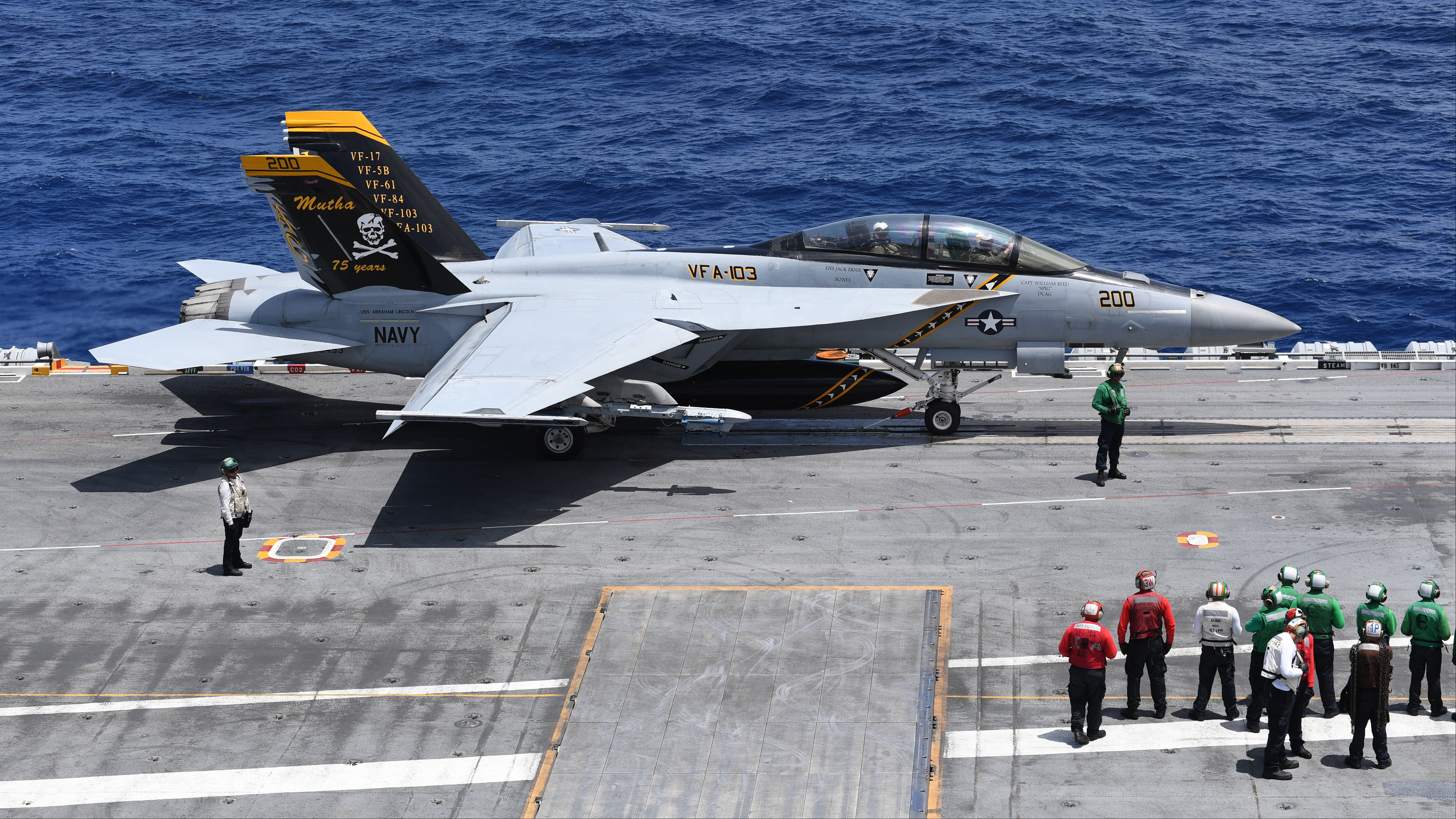
VFA-103 F/A-18F Super Hornet aboard USS Abraham Lincoln, in 2018.

VFA-103 and the rest of CVW-7 embarked on board USS Dwight D. Eisenhower on 2 January 2010 for a six-month deployment in support of 5th and 6th Fleet operations. On 27 July 2010, the squadron returned home to NAS Oceana after completion of their latest deployment.

After a successful maintenance and workup cycle, VFA-103 embarked with CVW-7 on board USS Dwight D. Eisenhower on 22 June 2012 for a scheduled nine-month deployment in the 5th Fleet Area of Operations. However, due to changes in operational requirements, VFA-103, CVW-7 and Dwight D. Eisenhower returned to NAS Oceana on 21 December 2012, to perform maintenance in preparation of returning to sea shortly thereafter. VFA-103 returned to sea on 21 February 2013 after the short turnaround, and along with the rest of CVW-7 and Carrier Strike Group Eight, supported operations in the 5th Fleet Area of Operations. After a combined eleven months at sea in support of Operation Enduring Freedom and Persian Gulf presence operations, the squadron returned to NAS Oceana on 3 July 2013.

In honor of the Jolly Rogers' 70th anniversary, the squadron undertook a redesign of the recognizable skull and crossbones insignia, choosing to feature the original VF-17 patches, colors, and tail fin.

The Jolly Rogers' F/A-18Fs were seen launching from USS Harry Truman in June 2016 participating in Operation Inherent Resolve, striking Daesh targets in Iraq and Syria, with multiple aircraft exhibiting signs of heavy combat, with a number of front fuselages being covered with bomb silhouettes representing munitions being dropped in combat air strikes.

A fictional version of the squadron, the "Jolly Wrenches", appeared in the Disney aviation film Planes, using the same livery, but the skull and crossbones are replaced by a piston-head and wrenches.

=== 2020s ===
In 2024, the Navy Midshipmen football Team revealed uniforms inspired by the Jolly Rogers will be worn during the annual Army–Navy Game.

Since 2023, the squadron currently flies a mix of two-seat F/A-18F Super Hornets and single-seat F/A-18E Super Hornets. The skull-and-crossbone design on the E model aircraft's tails sport an eye patch to denote that it's a single-seat jet.

In late April 2026, VFA-103, as part of CVW 7 onboard the George H. W. Bush entered the CENTCOM AOR. VFA-103’s F/A-18Fs and Es began combat operations against Iran and undertook naval blockade sorties within Operation Epic Fury.

== See also ==
- List of United States Navy aircraft squadrons
- Modern US Navy carrier air operations
- Naval aviation
