= VF-74 =

Fighter Squadron 74
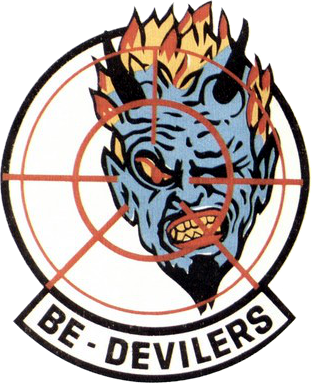
- VF-74 squadron patch
- Active: 16 April 1945 – 30 April 1994
- Country: United States
- Branch: United States Navy
- Role: Fighter aircraft
- Part of: Inactive
- Nickname(s): Be-Devilers

Aircraft flown
- Fighter: F6F-5 Hellcat; F8F-1 Bearcat; F4U-1/-4 Corsair; F9F-8 Cougar; F4D-1 Skyray; F-4B/J/S Phantom II; F-14A/B Tomcat

VF-74, Fighter Squadron 74, Be-Devilers was an aviation unit of the United States Navy in service from 1944 to 1994. Originally established as VBF-20 on 16 April 1945, it was redesignated as VF-10A on 15 November 1946, redesignated as VF-92 on 12 August 1948, redesignated as VF-74 on 15 January 1950 and disestablished on 30 April 1994. It was the third US Navy squadron to be designated as VF-74.

== History ==
VBF-20 was established on 16 April 1945 flying the F4U-1 Corsair from NAS Wildwood in New Jersey. After six months they transitioned to the F6F Hellcat but soon changed to F8F Bearcat. On 15 November 1946 their designation was changed to VF-10A and was part of Carrier Air Group 9 on board USS Philippine Sea and made their first deployment to the Mediterranean between February and June 1948. Before the cruise VF-10A had shifted to their new shore base of Naval Auxiliary Air Station Charlestown, Rhode Island. At the same time, the squadron had adopted their devil's insignia created by Ensign John P. Humphries. On 12 August 1948 the squadron became VF-92 and became part of CAG-7, moving to Naval Air Station Quonset Point and their final re-designation happened on 15 January 1950 when they became VF-74. They transitioned to the F4U-4 Corsair in 1951 and returned to the Mediterranean on board the USS Franklin D. Roosevelt.

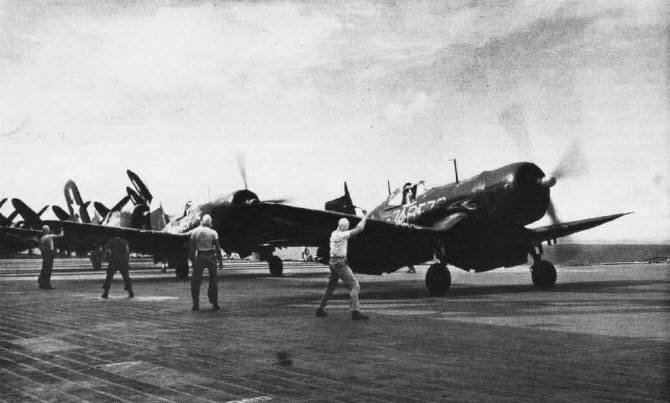
F4U-4s of VF-74 on USS Midway, 1945.

With the Korean War raging, CAG-7 transferred to the Pacific in May 1952 and conducted a combat cruise on board USS Bon Homme Richard. They were in combat for six months and flew 1500 combat sorties, mainly against North Korean targets. They also moved to the F9F-8 Cougar, their first jet aircraft.

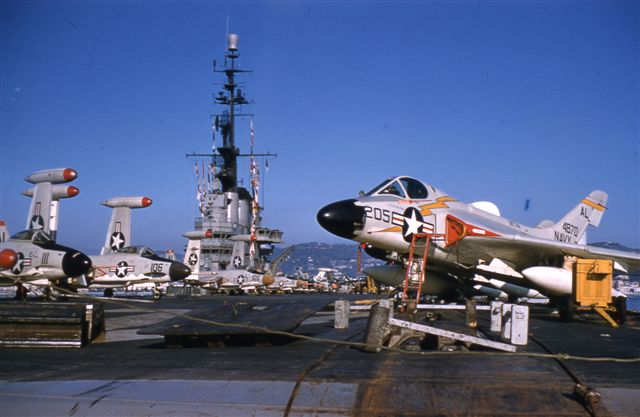
An F4D-1 Skyray of VF-74 on USS Franklin D. Roosevelt

Within 12 months the F9F-8 Cougar was replaced by the F4D-1 Skyray which was the US Navy's first supersonic fighter, although it was phased out in 1962. VF-74 deployed to the Mediterranean three times, twice on board USS Intrepid and their final deployment was on USS Franklin D. Roosevelt.

On 8 July 1961 VF-74 began to transition to the McDonnell Douglas F4H-1 Phantom II becoming the first deployable F-4 squadron, giving rise to their "First in Phantoms" motto. They deployed aboard USS Forrestal in August 1962 replacing VF-104's F4Ds in CAG-8{fact}. For 20 years VF-74 would deploy 15 times with the Phantom, 13 to the Mediterranean and two to South East Asia. Their first Vietnam cruise aboard Forrestal was marked by tragedy on 29 July 1967, when an ordnance explosion on the flight deck caused a massive ensuing fire. VF-74 lost 42 enlisted personnel and three F-4s. Many squadron members were commended for their heroic actions whilst fighting the fires.

In early 1972 they transitioned from the F-4B to the F-4J. Between July 1972 to February 1973 the squadron returned to combat in Vietnam on board USS America. During seven periods on the famous Yankee Station VF-74 did not lose a single aircraft to enemy action. VF-74 was just as successful in peace time, winning the CNO Safety "S" in 1974 along with the Battle "E". In 1975, they moved to CVW-8 and took part in the maiden cruise of USS Nimitz. In 1976 they won the Admiral Joseph Clifton Award, making them the top US Navy fighter squadron.

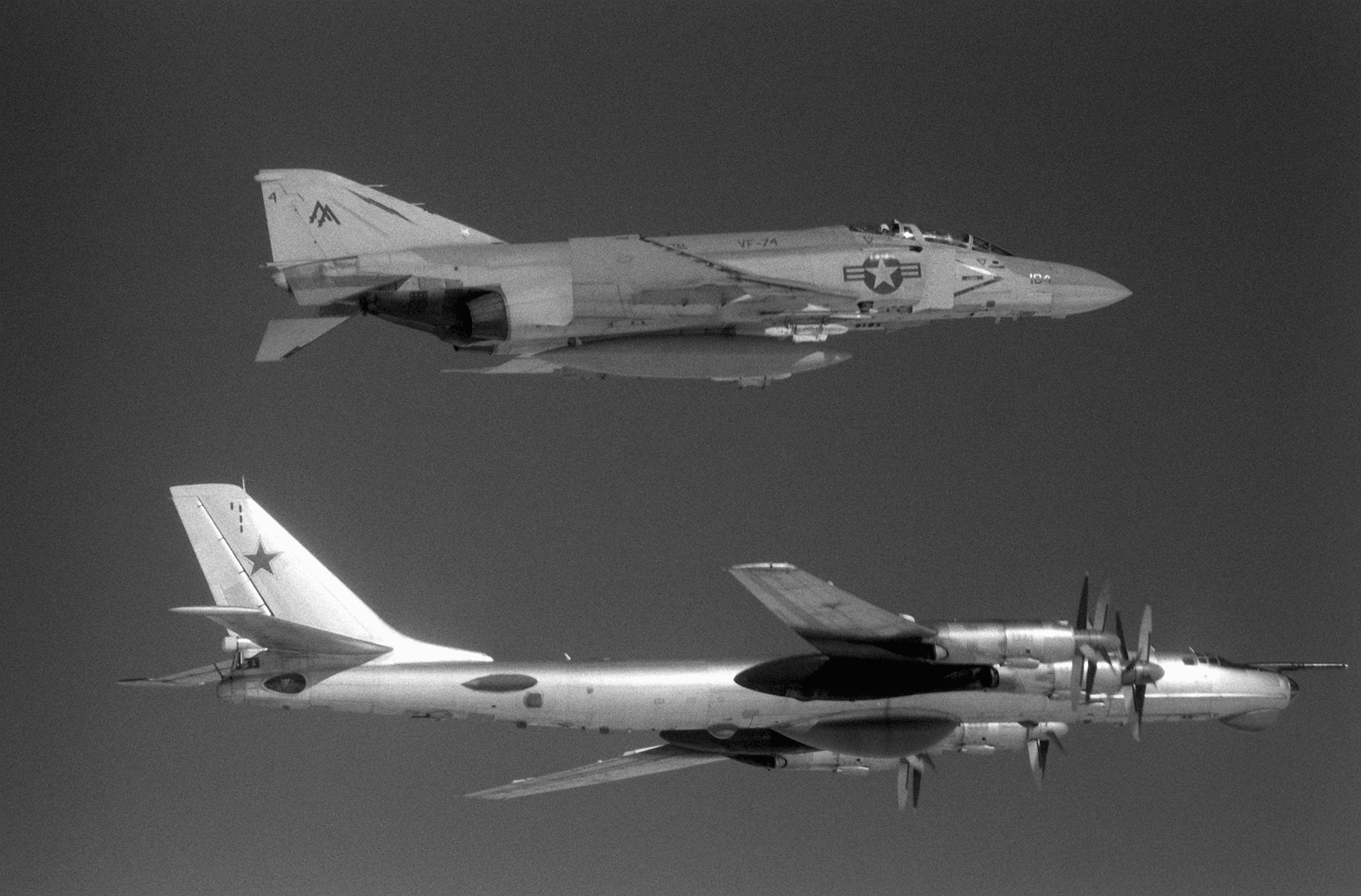
An VF-74 F-4S intercepting a Soviet Tu-95 "Bear D" in 1982.

In 1982 they transitioned from the F-4J to the F-4S and made their final cruise with the F-4 Phantom from May{date} to 16 November 1982. In February 1983 they began the transition to the F-14 Tomcat and in October the same year the squadron reported back to CVW-17 and their first cruise was in April 1984 on board USS Saratoga which ended in October the same year.

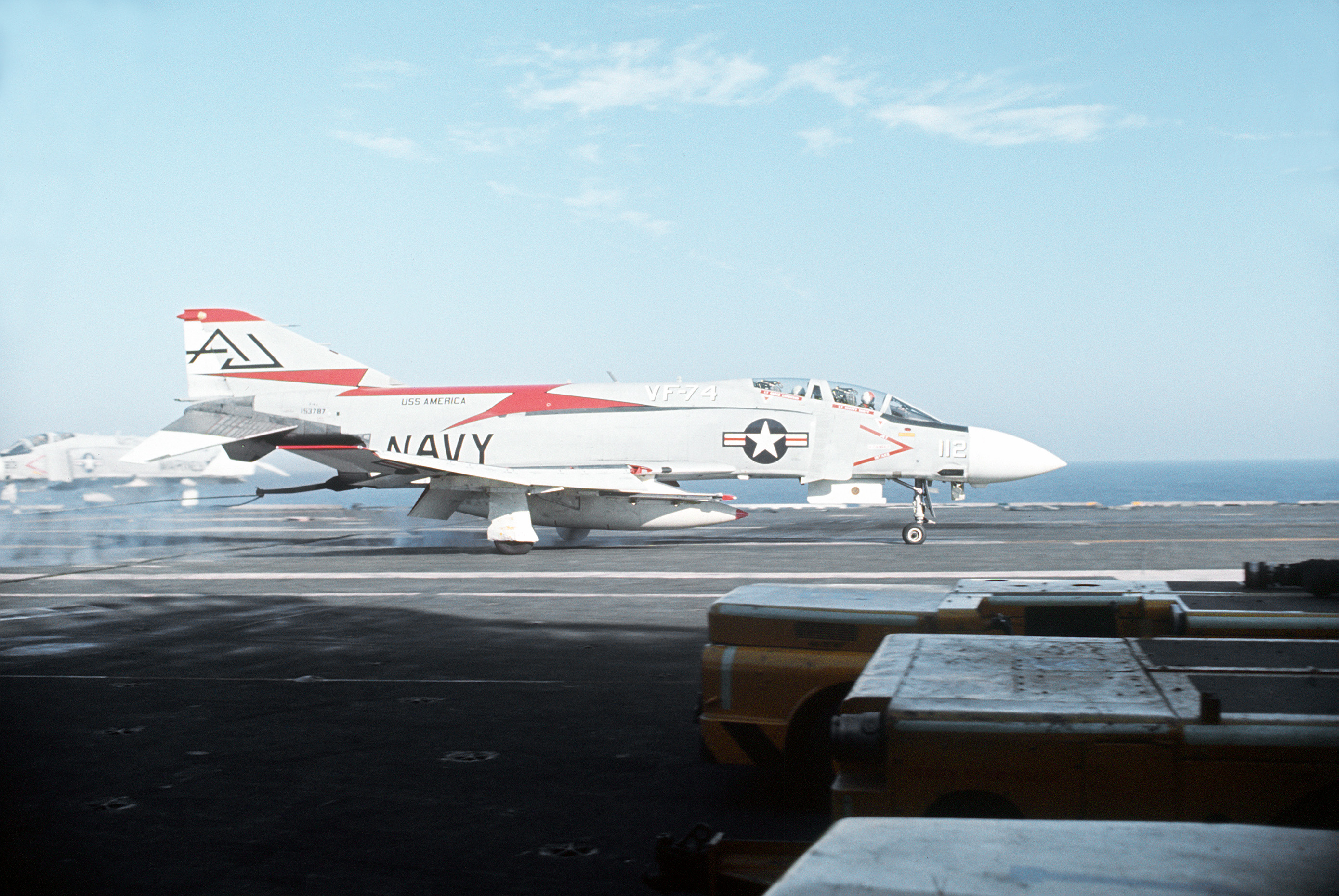
A F-4J of VF-74 during the deployment to Vietnam

In 1985 VF-74 and VF-103 became famous in the fight against terrorism. On 7 October, members of the Palestinian Liberation Front (PLF) hijacked the Italian cruise liner Achille Lauro. When the ship arrived in Syria the hijackers made their way to Egypt where they were promised free passage to Tunisia in return for the hostages' lives. The terrorists boarded an Egypt Air Boeing 737 on the night of 10 October. But based on US Intelligence, president Ronald Reagan ordered the Sixth Fleet to take action, to force down the 737 to Sigonella where US Special Forces could capture the hijackers. Four F-14s and an E-2C Hawkeye launched from Saratoga. The plan called for Saratoga's planes to make night intercepts and identifications of air contacts on the airways crisscrossing the central Mediterranean as they flew eastward toward a common airway intersection south of Crete. After four interceptions, following two hair-raising, lights out intercepts of planes, the F-14s found the right aircraft. At about 2230, 30 miles (48 km) southeast of Crete they closed in on the 737 which showed the tail number 2843 which identified the aircraft as the one they were looking for. After identifying themselves to the airliner's pilot, the American planes eventually were able to convince the 737 to land at the NATO base in Sigonella, Sicily. Upon landing, the airliner was quickly surrounded by American and Italian soldiers. After one thrilling hour in which Americans and Italians were facing each other, after a long call between the Italian First Minister Bettino Craxi and US President Ronald Reagan, the terrorists ultimately were taken into Italian custody.

1986 was another busy year for VF-74 as they took part in Operation Attain Document and Operation El Dorado Canyon. During the next few years, VF-74 would make regular deployments to the Mediterranean Sea as part of CVW-17.

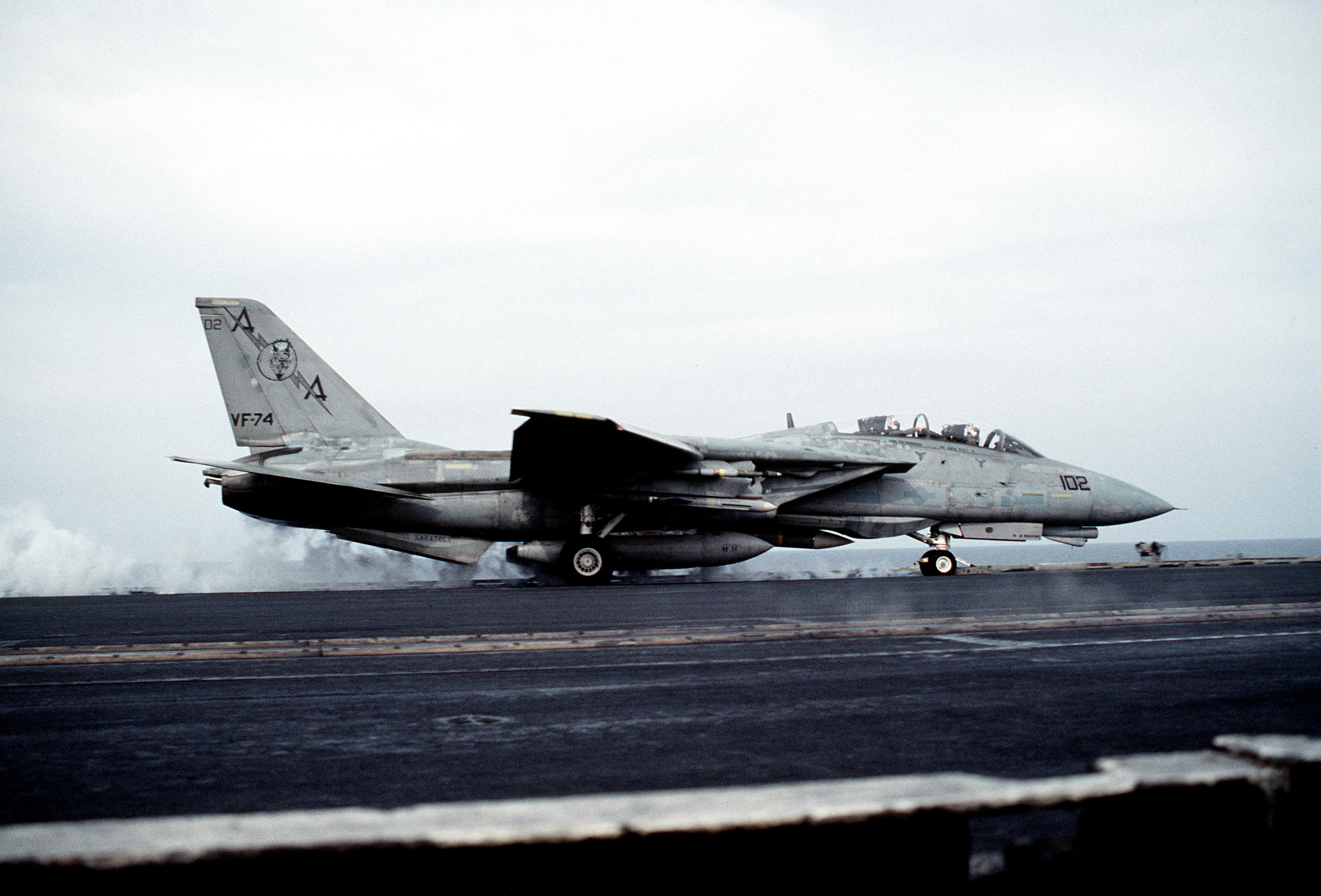
An F-14B Tomcat from VF-74 stationed aboard USS Saratoga

On 22 September 1987, an F-14A of VF-74 mistakenly shot down a United States Air Force RF-4C Phantom II of the 26th Tactical Reconnaissance Wing over the Mediterranean during the NATO exercise "Display Determination 87". Both the pilot and RIO of the RF-4C ejected, suffering numerous injuries in the process, and were rescued by a helicopter from the Saratoga. The investigation that followed determined that the F-14 pilot, LTJG Timothy "Smoke" Dorsey, made a lapse in judgement when misinterpreting the "Red and Free" clearance as permission to open fire despite other participants of the exercise being aware of the phrase's usage to signal a simulated shootdown. Dorsey was removed from flying status and continued serving in the Navy as an intelligence officer. Although nominated for promotion to rear admiral in 2012, a Senate committee rejected Dorsey's promotion after finding out about the incident.

On 11 August 1988, VF-74 became the first squadron to receive the F-14A+ (now F-14B). By the end of the year they had finished the transition and VF-74 became the first squadron to launch an AIM-54 Phoenix from an F-14A+.

In 1990, VF-74 took part in Operation Desert Shield and Operation Desert Storm. VF-74 relieved USS Dwight D. Eisenhower, they took up station in the Red Sea and worked with Saratoga''. After eight months they returned to NAS Oceana on 29 March 1991. Within a year, VF-74 was back on cruise with Saratoga on 6 May 1992. Operations included taking part in support of the United Nations aid to the former republics of Yugoslavia in July. On 14 September, VF-74 F-14s flew 1,700 nautical miles (3,100 km) from Saratoga operating in the Adriatic Sea, dropping ordnance on the Wadi Natrun target range in Egypt. The squadron returned home on 6 November.

As usual after returning from cruise, the squadron went straight to workups for the next deployment on board USS Constellation after the carrier had returned from Service Life Extension Program, they also conducted carrier qualifications on USS Saratoga. However, in August 1993 the Navy decided to deploy only one F-14 squadron on board Saratoga, and as VF-74 was a non-TARPS squadron they were left back home and moved from CVW-17 to be under direct command of Fighter Wing Atlantic. Although they did not take part in any cruise VF-74 took up aggressor role with various Navy and Air Force squadrons. On 20 January 1994, VF-74 took part in the last deployment, this time to Roosevelt Roads Naval Station in February where VF-74 launched seven air-to-air missiles with 100% success rate. On 30 April 1994, VF-74 was disestablished after 50 years of service.

== See also ==
- History of the United States Navy
- List of inactive United States Navy aircraft squadrons
- List of United States Navy aircraft squadrons
