= VF-61 =

Fighter Squadron 61
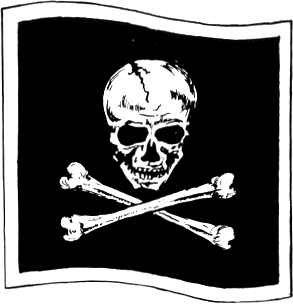
- Active: 1 January 1943 – 15 April 1959
- Country: United States
- Branch: United States Navy
- Role: Fighter
- Part of: Inactive
- Nickname: Jolly Rogers
- Engagements: World War II

Aircraft flown
- Fighter: F4U-1 Corsair; F6F-5 Hellcat; FJ-3 Fury; F3H-2M Demon

Fighter Squadron 61 (VF-61), the Jolly Rogers, was a fighter squadron of the United States Navy. Originally established as VF-17 on 1 January 1943, it was redesignated as VF-5B on 15 November 1946, and then later as VF-61 on 28 July 1948. It was disestablished on 15 April 1959. It was the first navy squadron to be designated VF-17.

== Operational history ==
=== World War II ===
VF-17 was established on 1 January 1943, at NAS Norfolk, with Lieutenant Commander John T. "Tommy" Blackburn as its commander. It was the second Navy fighter squadron to receive the F4U-1 Corsair and the most successful of them all.

Blackburn wanted a squadron insignia that had a piratical theme to it to match the F4U's Corsair designation; hence the skull and crossbones were chosen. The original design was developed by Harry Hollmeyer, who became an ace pilot. The squadron helped during the development of the F4U Corsair resulting in some design changes, resulting in the F4U-1A. Unfortunately, the Navy still deemed the Corsair unfit for carrier service and instead of joining USS Bunker Hill, VF-17 became a land-based squadron in the Solomon Islands during most of its deployment to the South Pacific.

On 8 November 1943, the squadron executive officer, Roger Hedrick, led a flight which intercepted 39 Japanese fighters over Empress Augusta Bay, Bougainville. As the Japanese fighters fled back to their base, VF-17 was responsible for downing 3 fighters and damaging 4 others. Though outnumbered, the squadron survived the encounter with no losses. This action was typical of the squadron's land-based service in the Solomon Islands in 1943 and 1944, when it went up against the cream of Imperial Japanese Navy pilots then based at Rabaul.

In its two tours of duty in the Solomon Islands, VF-17 had 152 aerial victories and produced 11 aces. VF-17 finished its combat tour on 10 May 1944, was equipped with the F6F-5 Hellcat and moved to the USS Hornet. Here, the squadron amassed 161 victories, and produced 12 aces. Overall, the two combat tours of VF-17 were credited with 313 victories, the most of any US Navy squadron.

=== Postwar ===
In the postwar period the squadron flew the F4U-4 Corsair, F8F-2 Bearcat, F9F-2 Panther, F9F-8 Cougar, FJ-3 Fury and F3H-2M Demon. It was disestablished on 15 April 1959.

Following its disestablishment, two other U.S. Naval Aviation squadrons have used the name and insignia of the Jolly Roger: VF-84 (1955-95) and VFA-103.

== Gallery ==
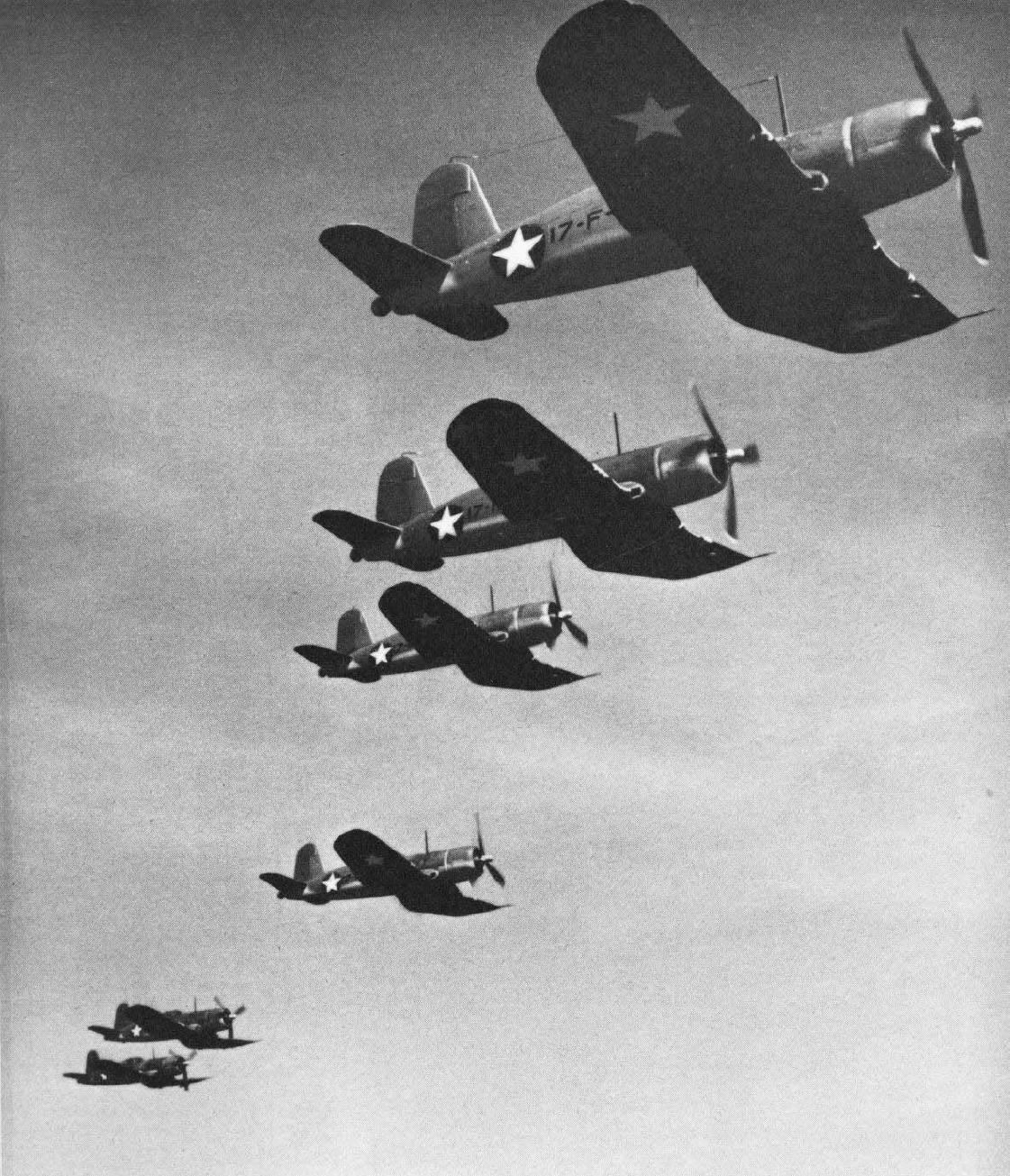
VF-17 F4U-1s in 1943

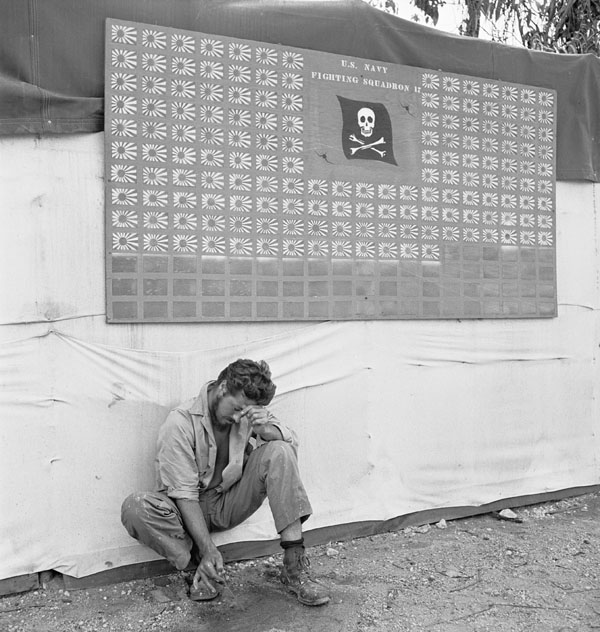
"Tired member of VF-17 pauses under the squadron scoreboard at Bougainville", February 1944

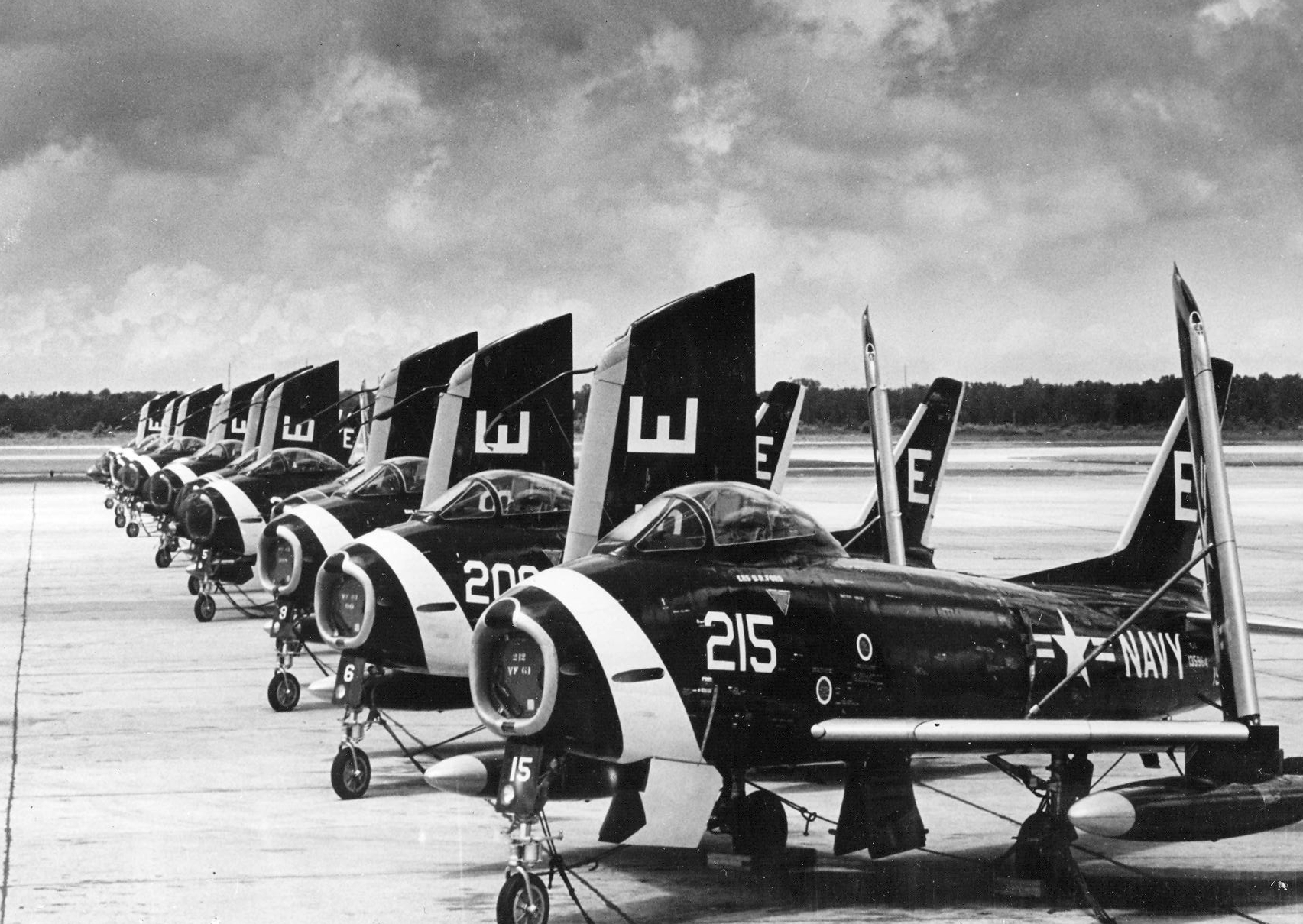
VF-61 FJ-3s at NAS Oceana, c.1955

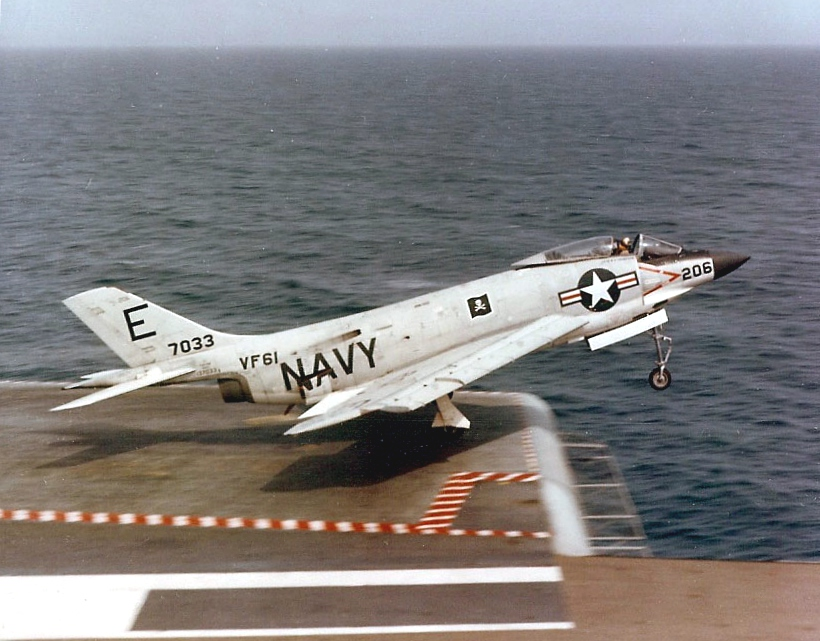
VF-61 F3H-2M launches from USS Franklin D. Roosevelt in 1957

== See also ==
- History of the United States Navy
- List of inactive United States Navy aircraft squadrons
- List of United States Navy aircraft squadrons
