= VF-84 (1955–1995) =

Fighter Squadron 84
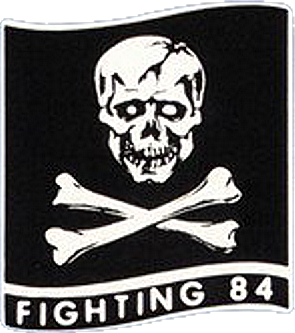
- VF-84 squadron patch
- Founded: 1 July 1955; 71 years ago
- Disbanded: 1 October 1995; 31 years ago
- Allegiance: United States
- Branch: United States Navy
- Role: Fighter aircraft
- Nickname: Jolly Rogers

Aircraft flown
- Fighter: FJ-3M Fury; F-8C Crusader; F-4B/J/N Phantom II; F-14A Tomcat

VF-84, Fighter Squadron 84 was an aviation unit of the United States Navy. Originally established as VA-86 on 1 July 1955, it was immediately redesignated as VF-84 and was disestablished on 1 October 1995. It was the third US Navy squadron to be designated as VF-84. The squadron was nicknamed the Jolly Rogers and was based at NAS Oceana. It took the number but not the lineage of VF-84 the "Wolf Gang" and the insignia of VF-61 the Jolly Rogers.

== Related squadrons ==
Five distinct U.S. Naval Aviation squadrons have used either the designation VF-84 or the name and insignia of the Jolly Roger: VF-17/VF-5B/VF-61 Jolly Rogers, VF-84 (1953–5), VF-84 Vagabonds/Jolly Rogers, and VF-103/VFA-103 Jolly Rogers. These are all distinctly different squadrons that have no lineal linkage. Three of these squadrons have used the Jolly Roger name, the skull and crossbones insignia and traditions at various times. The VF-84 Jolly Rogers (1955–95) are the main topic of this article. After the disestablishment of VF-84 in 1995, VF-103 Sluggers changed their squadron's name and insignia to that of the Jolly Rogers.

== Operational history ==
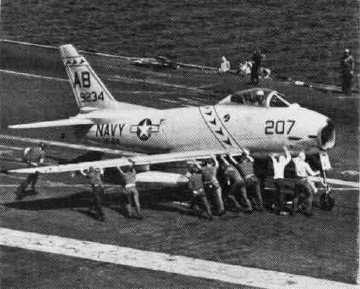
VF-84 FJ-3M on the USS Forrestal.

The third VF-84, initially known as the Vagabonds, was established on 1 July 1955, at NAS Oceana flying the FJ-3 Fury. After deactivation of VF-61 in 1959, VF-84's commanding officer, formerly with VF-61, requested to change his squadron's name and insignia to that of the Jolly Rogers. His request was approved on 1 April 1960.

The squadron then was reassigned to Carrier Air Wing Seven and made a single deployment on the USS Randolph (CVA-15) in 1958/59. The squadron transitioned to the F8U-2 Crusader in 1959.

VF-84 deployed aboard Independence during the Cuban Missile Crisis and the Bay of Pigs incident, the squadron made several Mediterranean cruises on board the Independence. The squadron flew the F-8C Crusaders for several years prior to being introduced to the F-4B during 1964.

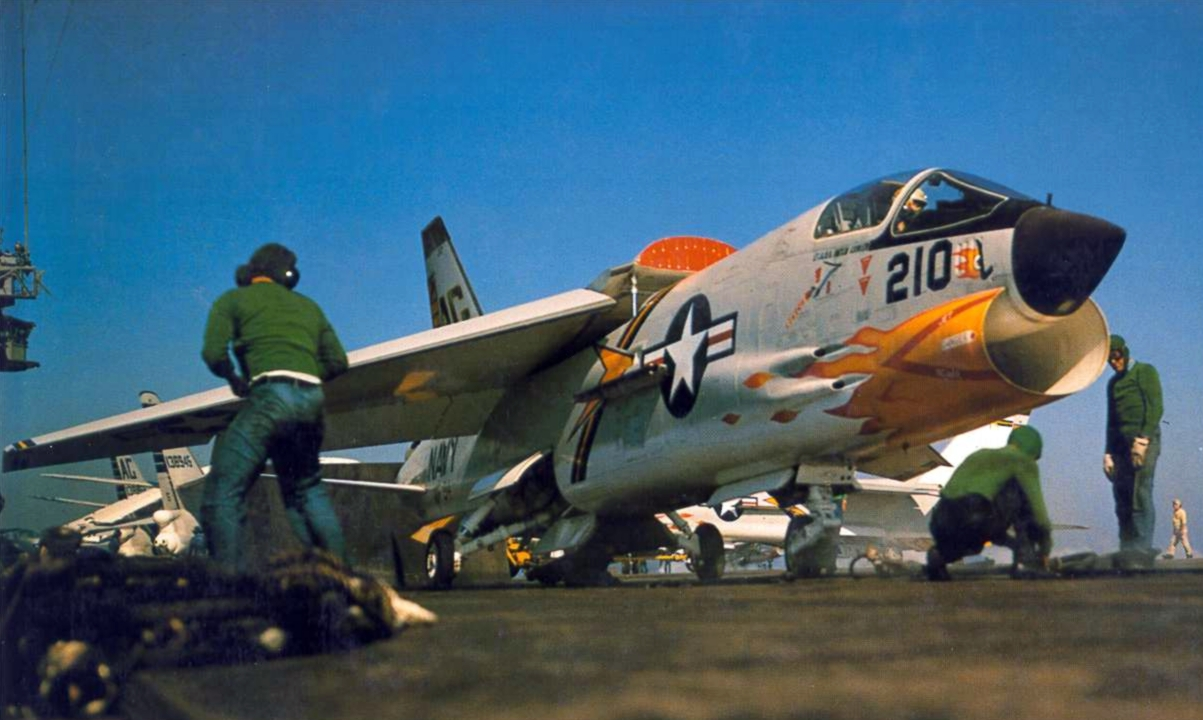
A VF-84 F-8C Crusader aboard USS Independence, 1963.

In 1964, VF-84 transitioned to the F-4 Phantom II and flew the F-4B, F-4J and the F-4N until they transitioned to the F-14 Tomcat in early 1976. In 1965, the squadron deployed for 7 months on board Independence in the Gulf of Tonkin and flew 1507 combat sorties, logging 2200 flight hours over both North Vietnam and South Vietnam.

From 1970 to 1975, VF-84 was assigned to Carrier Air Wing Six aboard the USS Franklin D. Roosevelt (CVA-42) for four deployments to the Mediterranean Sea. Roosevelt's twenty-first Sixth Fleet deployment was marked by indirect participation in the October 1973 Yom Kippur War, as she served as a transit "landing field" for aircraft being delivered to Israel. The Roosevelt battlegroup, Task Force 60.2, also stood by for possible evacuation contingencies. Planes of VF-84 (temporarily assigned to VF-41 for the 1973–74 cruise and operating with VF-41 markings) escorted US transport planes to within 150 miles of Israel during Operation Nickel Grass, the resupply of Israel.

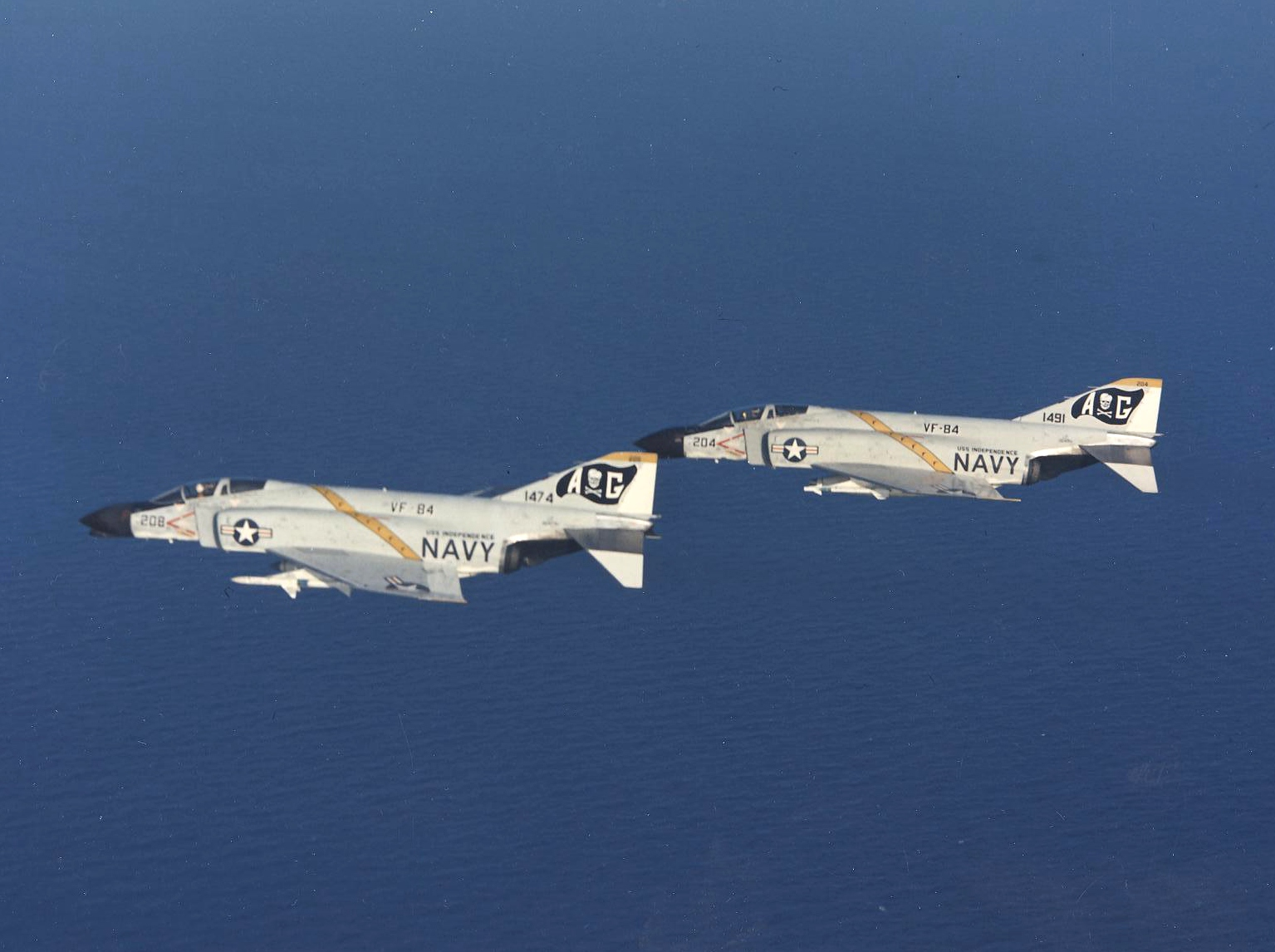
F-4Bs of VF-84, flying from Independence in 1964.

After its transition to the F-14 was completed, the squadron embarked on its first cruise on Nimitz in December 1977. In 1979, the unit was the first TARPS capable squadron of the fleet. That same year, it participated in the production of the motion picture The Final Countdown, which was released in 1980. The movie propelled the skull-and-crossbones-adorned F-14s to international stardom and notably featured a memorable scene involving two VF-84 Tomcats engaging two Japanese A6M Zeros.

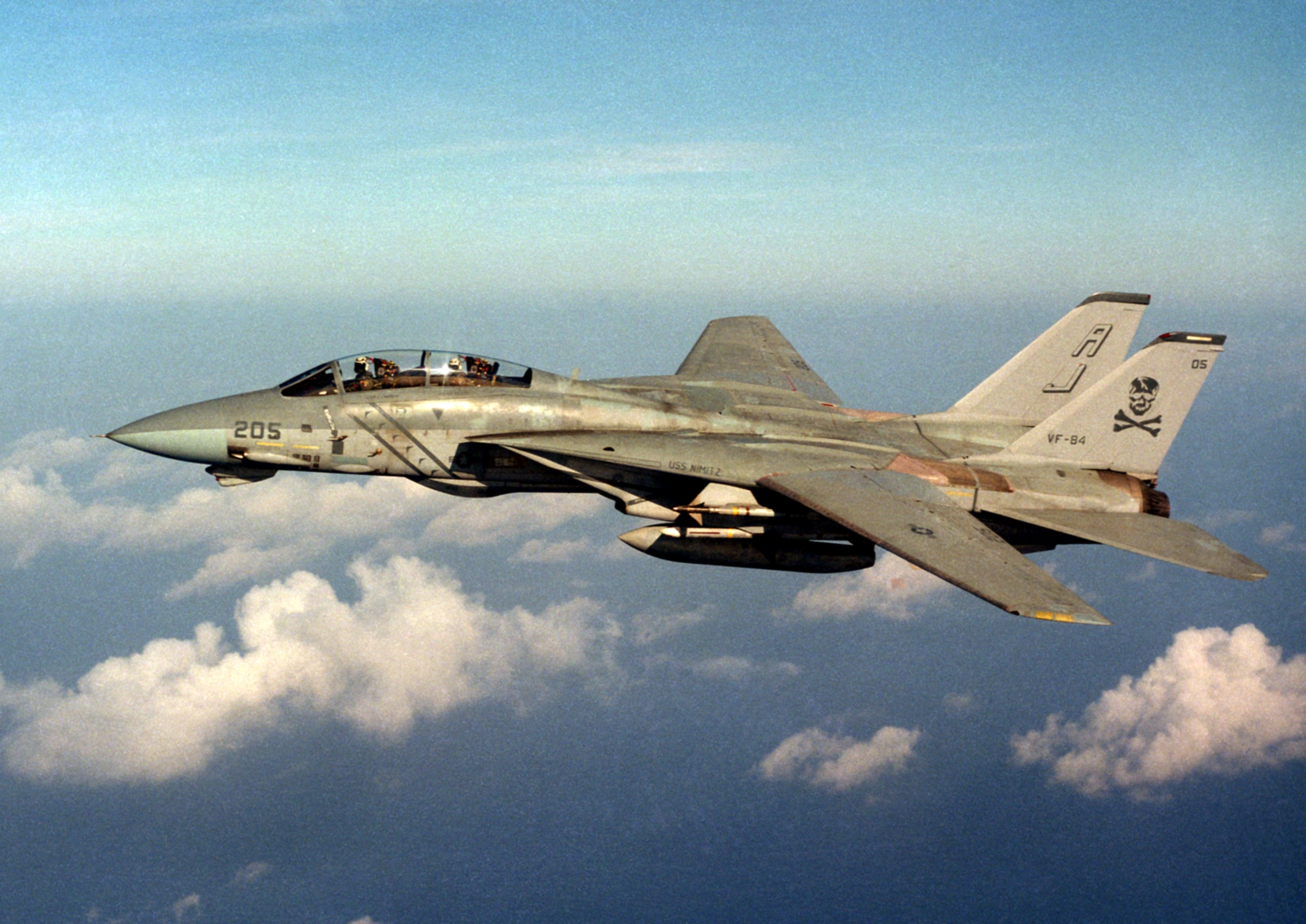
VF-84 F-14A in 1986

In January 1980, Nimitz diverted from the Mediterranean to take up station in the Arabian Sea in response to the Iranian hostage crisis and in April participated in the failed hostage rescue attempt. An F-14 was lost towards the end of the cruise when it suffered an engine failure while launching off the Nimitz and rolled over during the subsequent stall recovery attempt. Both crew members were killed as a result of ejecting into the water while the aircraft was inverted.

In November 1983, the squadron embarked on an extended deployment off the coast of Beirut, Lebanon, in support of a multinational peacekeeping force. During 1985, VF-84 spent 68 days off the coast of Lebanon in response to the hijacking of TWA Flight 847.

The squadron's last cruise with Nimitz lasted from December 1986 until June 1987, when Nimitz was rebased to Bremerton, WA. In October 1988, CVW-8 (the carrier wing of which VF-84 was a part) was deployed with Theodore Roosevelt, beginning in the North Atlantic for Exercise Teamwork '88 which involved operations with the Royal Norwegian Air Force. Roosevelt's first Mediterranean deployment was in December. VF-84 also did Shakedown and initial carrier qualifications for the USS Abraham Lincoln in late 1989–1990.

In December 1990, Theodore Roosevelt deployed as the last carrier to join the Operation Desert Shield force. "TR" joined Ranger and Midway in the Persian Gulf and was later joined by America. Throughout the Gulf War, VF-84 flew combat air patrols for the fleet, escorting the Air Wing Eight’s strike aircraft and performing TARPS missions to collect bomb damage assessments. In total, squadron members flew 468 combat sorties. After the war, VF-84 flew an additional 111 sorties in support of Operation Provide Comfort before Roosevelt was relieved by Forrestal in June 1991.

In March 1993, VF-84 deployed again on Theodore Roosevelt, the only F-14 squadron in a reconfigured airwing that included Marine F/A-18, (HMH-362) CH-53D and UH-1N squadrons. VF-84 flew critical TARPS reconnaissance missions during Operation Deny Flight, providing information about Bosnian Serb positions around Sarajevo. The squadron also flew in support of Operation Southern Watch, enforcing the no-fly zone over southern Iraq. VF-84 returned to NAS Oceana in September 1993. It was to be the squadron's last Mediterranean deployment.

Due to the downsizing of the Navy after the Cold War, the Navy disestablished several squadrons, and VF-84 was one of them. The squadron spent its last eighteen months of existence participating in several joint service operations, honing its skills in air-to-air combat, strike and TARPS. The squadron also made another memorable appearance in another motion picture, Executive Decision. VF-84 was disestablished on 1 October 1995, but VF-103 Sluggers adopted the name and insignia of the Jolly Rogers. From its transition to the F-14 until its disestablishment, VF-84 had been a part of CVW-8.

== Popular culture ==
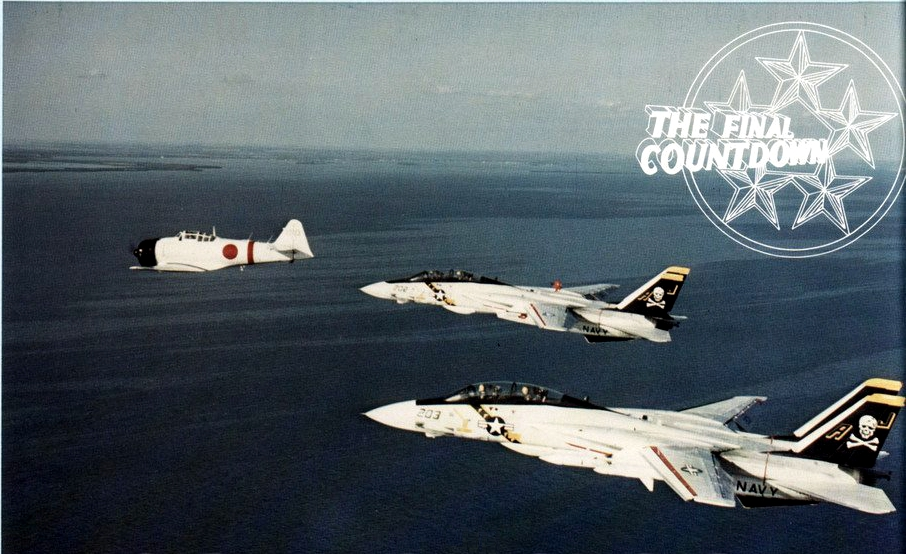
Tomcats from VF-84 with a T-6 converted to resemble a Zero, during filming of The Final Countdown.

- The markings of Roy Focker's VF-1S Valkyrie (which was itself inspired by the F-14 Tomcat) in The Super Dimension Fortress Macross is obviously inspired by the squadron insignia of VF-84, and his "Skull Squadron" is considered the equivalent of VF-84; in the Americanized version, Robotech, the squadron was also considered to be elite. In the movie Macross: Do You Remember Love this is even more apparent, as the skull-and-crossbones insignia is worn by all Valkyries in Skull Squadron. This painting scheme has continued to be reproduced in both the prequel series Macross Zero (2002), on Focker's VF-0S experimental Valkyrie, and more recently Macross Frontier (2008), where the pilot Ozma Lee, as the senior leader of Skull Squadron, has the markings on his VF-25S.
- VF-84 plays a predominant role in The Final Countdown
- VF-84 Tomcats appear in a brief scene in The Philadelphia Experiment
- VF-84 Tomcats are featured in the movie Executive Decision. This was the squadron's last film appearance before disestablishment.
- VF-84 is one of two squadrons that help dismantle the Soviet fighter force based on Iceland in Tom Clancy's novel Red Storm Rising
- The livery of the fictional Wardog Squadron in the video game Ace Combat 5: The Unsung War bears a resemblance to that of VF-84.
- VA-87 Planes film LTV A-7 Corsair II named George Dixon Jolly wrenches

== See also ==
- History of the United States Navy
- List of inactive United States Navy aircraft squadrons
- List of United States Navy aircraft squadrons
