= HSC-9 =

Helicopter Sea Combat Squadron Nine
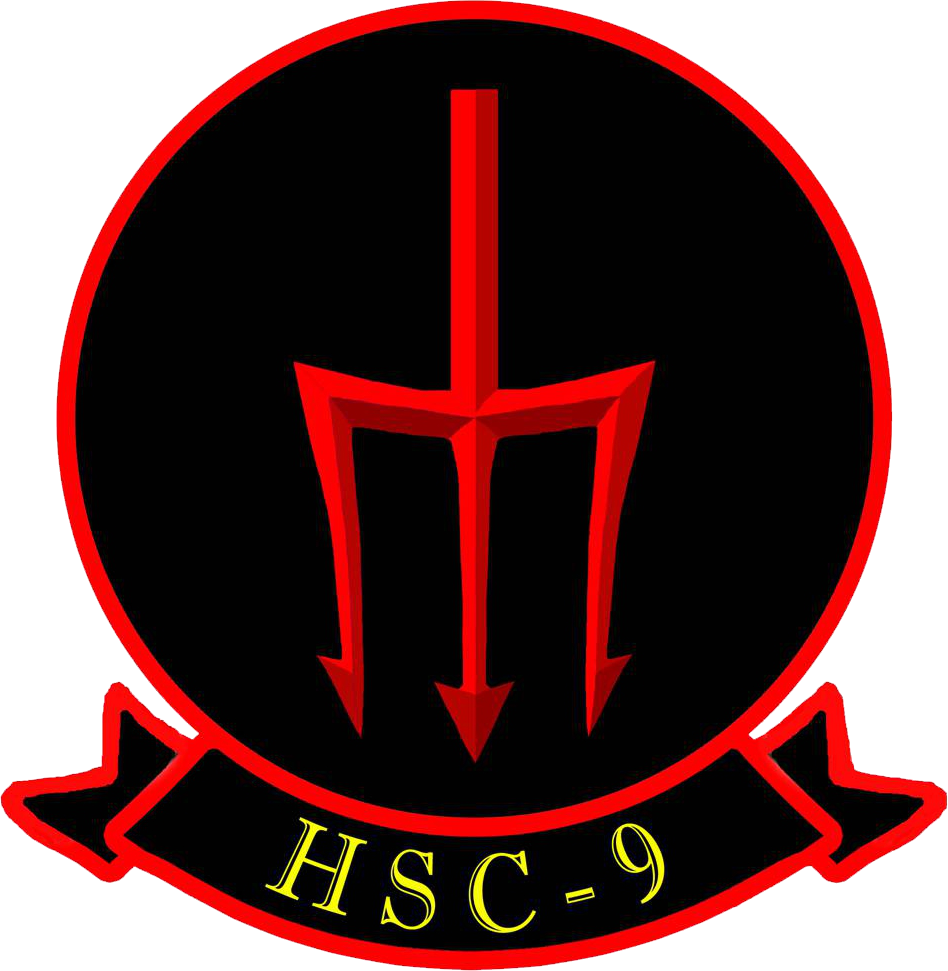
- Active: 18 June 1952 - present
- Country: United States of America
- Branch: United States Navy
- Type: Navy Helicopter Squadron
- Role: Anti-Surface Warfare (ASUW); Combat Search and Rescue CSAR; Search and Rescue (SAR); Special Operations (SpecOps); Vertical Replenishment (VERTREP)
- Part of: Carrier Air Wing Eight; Commander, Helicopter Sea Combat Wing Atlantic
- Garrison/HQ: NS Norfolk
- Nickname: "Tridents"
- Colors: Black and Red
- Engagements: Operation Enduring Freedom; Operation Iraqi Freedom; Global War on Terror; Operation Southern Spear; Operation Epic Fury

Commanders
- Current commander: CDR Robert W. Anderson IV

Helicopter Sea Combat Squadron 9 (HSC-9) "Tridents" is a United States Navy helicopter squadron based at Naval Air Station Norfolk, Norfolk, Virginia (United States). The squadron is equipped with the Sikorsky MH-60S Seahawk. Currently, HSC-9 is attached to Carrier Air Wing Eight. It was originally established as Helicopter Anti-Submarine Squadron 3 (HS-3) in 1952 and was redesignated on 1 June 2009.

== Mission ==
Helicopter Sea Combat Squadron Nine's primary mission is to employ the versatility of the MH-60S helicopter to support the strike group commander's objectives, with emphasis on Anti-Surface Warfare (ASUW), Combat Search and Rescue (CSAR), support of Special Operations, and Vertical Replenishment (VERTREP). Secondary missions include Anti-Ship Missile defense and Medical Evacuation (MEDEVAC).

== History ==
=== Helicopter Anti-Submarine Squadron 3 (HS-3) ===
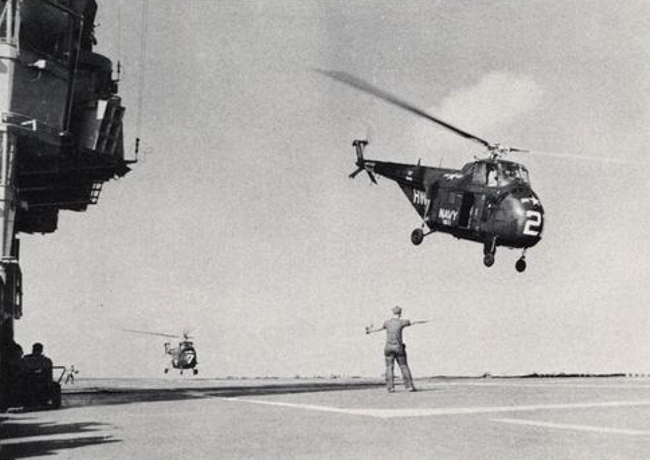
A HO4S of HS-3 over USS Siboney in 1956.

HSC-9 was established as Helicopter Antisubmarine Squadron Three (HS-3) on 18 June 1952, at the Naval Air Facility Elizabeth City, North Carolina. The Tridents commenced operations flying the Piasecki HUP-2S Retriever helicopter, and later transitioned to the Sikorsky HO4S and Sikorsky HSS-1 Seabat helicopters. In 1959 the squadron received the Sikorsky HSS-1N Seabat giving it the capability to operate at night. HS-3 was the first Atlantic Fleet operational squadron to operate the gas turbine powered HSS-2 Sea King in 1961. In September 1962 in compliance with the 1962 United States Tri-Service aircraft designation system the HSS-2 Sea King was redesignated the SH-3A Sea King. In 1967 the squadron received the SH-3D, and finally the SH-3H TACNAV equipped helicopter in 1979. Additionally in 1982, HS-3 became the first squadron to deploy with the AQS-13E Sonar Data Computer.

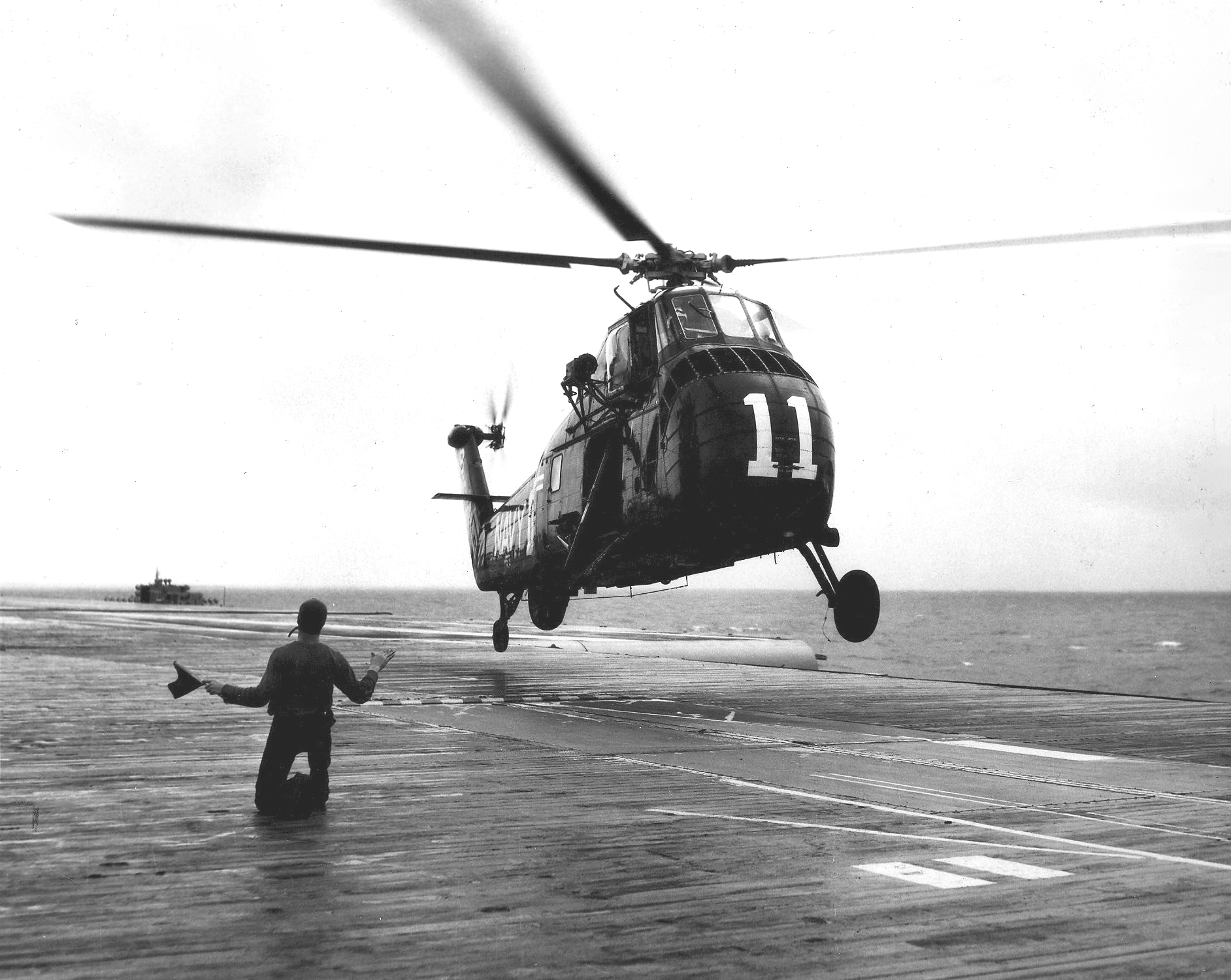
A HSS-1 Seabat of HS-3 landing on USS Essex in 1957.

HS-3 was first deployed aboard USS Antietam and USS Leyte in late 1956, flying the HSS-1 Seabat. This was followed by assignments to USS Lake Champlain, USS Tarawa, and USS Valley Forge, in 1958–60.

From 1960 to 1970, HS-3 was assigned to Carrier Anti-Submarine Air Group 56 (CVSG-56). CVSG-56 was first assigned to Valley Forge before moving to USS Randolph, in 1961. HS-3 then transitioned to the Sikorsky HSS-2/SH-3A Sea King. In 1962, on board USS Wasp, HS-3 participated in the naval blockade of Cuba. The Air Group was reassigned to USS Intrepid in 1962 until she was deployed as an attack carrier to Vietnam in 1966. The Tridents began an active role in the space program on 24 May 1962, when then CO Commander J. M. Wondergem picked up Lieutenant Commander M. S. Carpenter from his Aurora 7 spacecraft and delivered him to Intrepid. Astronauts Carpenter, Grissom, Young, Collins, Gordon, Conrad, McDivitt, Scott, and Schweickart all ended their space journeys with rides aboard HS-3 helicopters.

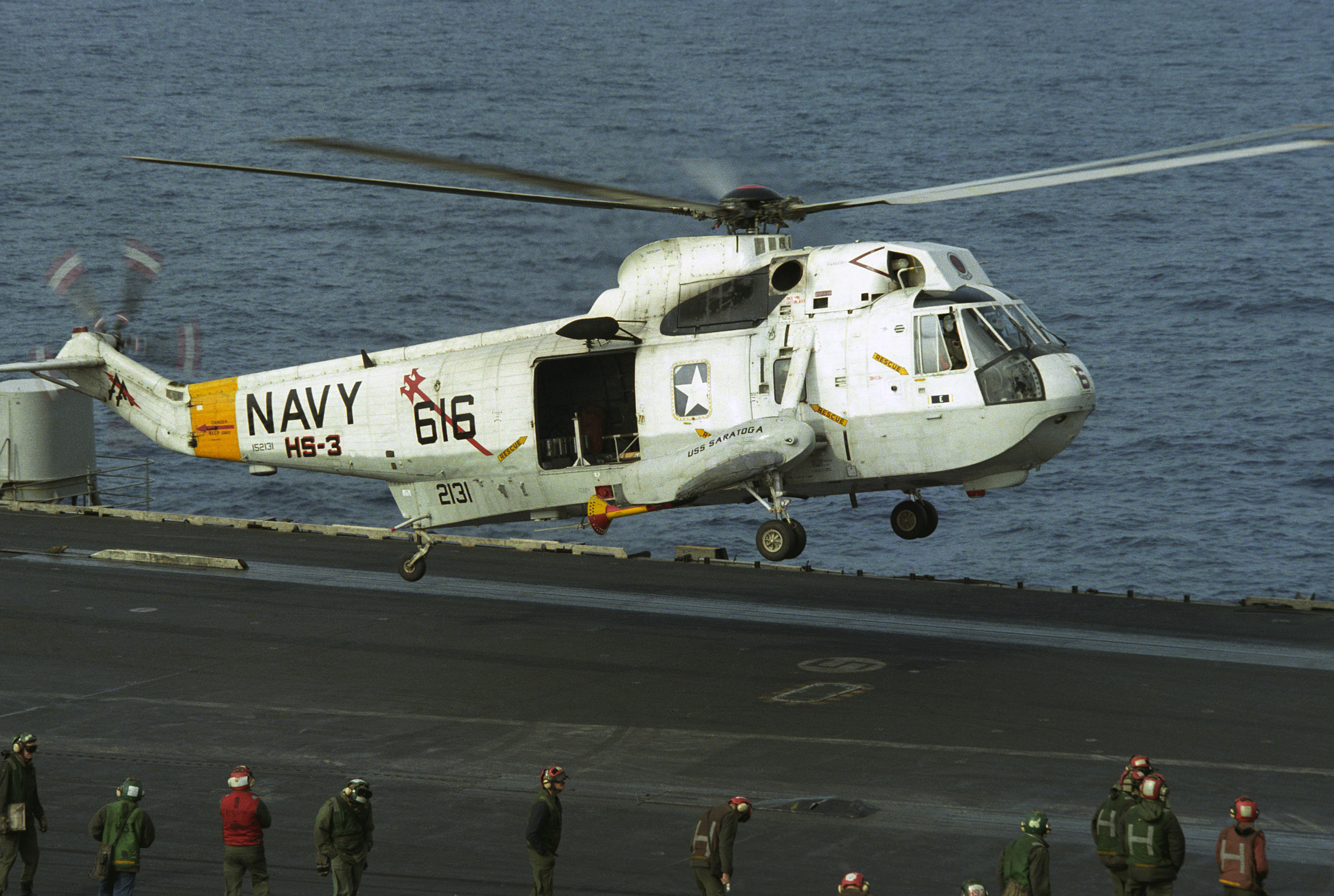
An HS-3 SH-3H Sea King aboard USS Saratoga, in 1986.

In 1967, CVSG-56 and HS-3 again deployed aboard Randolph, having received the SH-3D Sea King. Two years later, CVSG-56 was reassigned to USS Yorktown and then to Intrepid in 1970. HS-3 was then reassigned to Carrier Air Wing Seventeen aboard USS Forrestal. In the early 1970s, the squadron participated in the relief of Tunisian flood victims, rescuing or relocating 630 people while transporting over 43,000 pounds (20,000 kg) of food and medical supplies. In recognition of this humanitarian support, the squadron was awarded the Meritorious Unit Commendation. In July 1976, a detachment from HS-3 went aboard Forrestal and participated in the United States Bicentennial celebrations in New York Harbor. Squadron personnel participated in some of the publicity events leading up to the actual ringing of Forrestal's bell on 4 July 1976. HS-3 won the Battle "E" in 1973 and 1978 as well as the Isbell Trophy in 1974 and 1978. In 1979, HS-3 received the SH-3H Sea King.

From 1984 to 1991, CVW-17 and HS-3 were reassigned to USS Saratoga. HS-3 was awarded two Navy Unit Commendations for operational accomplishments and outstanding maintenance efforts during the 1985-86 Mediterranean and Indian Ocean deployment on board Saratoga. The Tridents won three consecutive Battle "E" Awards for 1985, 1986 and 1987. They also won back-to-back Isbell Trophies in 1986 and 1987. In 1990, the Tridents enforced United Nations sanctions against Iraqi trade while deployed on board the Saratoga in the Red Sea. HS-3 conducted an actual Helicopter Visit, Board, Search and Seizure (HVBSS) with a special forces boarding team to "take down" a hostile merchant ship during Operation Desert Shield/Operation Desert Storm. HS-3 was awarded a Navy Unit Commendation for the combat support they provided in the campaign. The squadron returned home in early 1991 and was the first Atlantic squadron to transition to the Sikorsky SH-60F/HH-60H Seahawk.

After transition to the SH-60F and HH-60H Seahawk in 1991, HS-3 was assigned to CVW-8 aboard USS Theodore Roosevelt, in 1993. Preparations for the squadron's 1995 Mediterranean deployment were interrupted when the Tridents were called on to support Operation Uphold Democracy during the military intervention in Haiti. HS-3 provided the sole Navy maritime SAR, CSAR and special operations support. The Tridents deployed one week after the completion of Uphold Democracy and flew in support of Operation Deny Flight over Bosnia-Herzegovina. During this deployment, HS-3 also flew the first actual CSAR mission by an HS squadron since the Vietnam era to search for the crew of a downed French Mirage fighter. In 1997, HS-3 deployed aboard USS John F. Kennedy to the Mediterranean Sea and the Persian Gulf.

The Tridents again deployed aboard Theodore Roosevelt in March 1999 and headed straight into the first of two conflicts. During Operation Noble Anvil, HS-3 supported combat operations against Serbia in Kosovo. Once a cease-fire was agreed upon, Theodore Roosevelt transited the Persian Gulf to support maritime interdiction operations and enforce no-fly zones over southern Iraq. In August, HS-3 conducted a successful HVBSS to a freighter violating UN sanctions. The operation seized $3.5 million in Iraqi contraband. During this demanding deployment, HS-3 lifted over 1,800,000 pounds (820,000 kg) of cargo and completed over 2,000 small deck landings. HS-3 was awarded the Battle "E" for 1999.

In April 2001, HS-3 deployed aboard USS Enterprise. In response to the terror attacks on the World Trade Center and the Pentagon, the Tridents conducted sustained operations in support of Operation Enduring Freedom in Afghanistan.

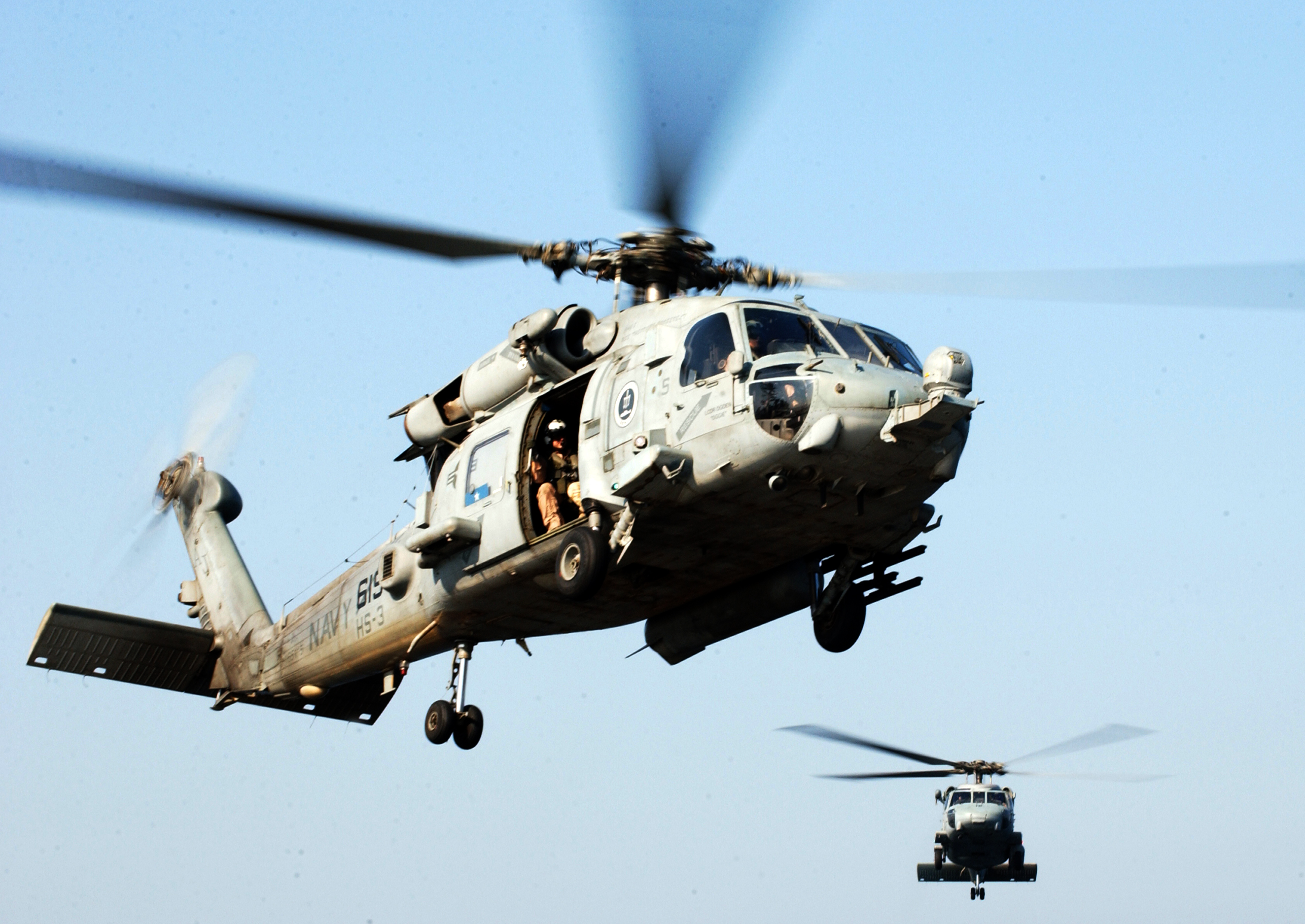
HH-60H and SH-60F of HS-3 in 2005.

The Tridents deployed in 2003 aboard Theodore Roosevelt after a compressed inter-deployment readiness cycle. During the course of the deployment, HS-3 conducted ASW, logistics, and SAR operations in support of Operation Iraqi Freedom.

In September 2008, after completing a lengthy training cycle, the Tridents deployed aboard Theodore Roosevelt to the Arabian Sea in support of combat operations in Afghanistan. Along the way, HS-3 took part in a historic visit to Cape Town, South Africa. Theodore Roosevelt was the first U. S. carrier to visit Cape Town in over 40 years. Once arriving on-station in the CENTCOM AOR, the Tridents flew plane guard, anti-terrorism force protection, anti-surface warfare, logistics, and anti-submarine warfare in direct support of Operation Enduring Freedom and maritime security operations during the 2008-2009 deployment. The Tridents also detached three HH-60H aircraft to USS San Antonio and subsequently to USNS Lewis and Clark for two months. This detachment supported Combined Task Force 151 counter-piracy operations in the Gulf of Aden. The Tridents assisted in apprehending 16 suspected pirates and paved the way for future operations in the region. In 2008, HS-3 won the CNAF Aviation Battle Efficiency, Commander, Naval Aviation Safety Center Safety "S", and the CAPT A. J. Isbell Trophy.

=== Helicopter Sea Combat Squadron 9 (HSC-9) ===
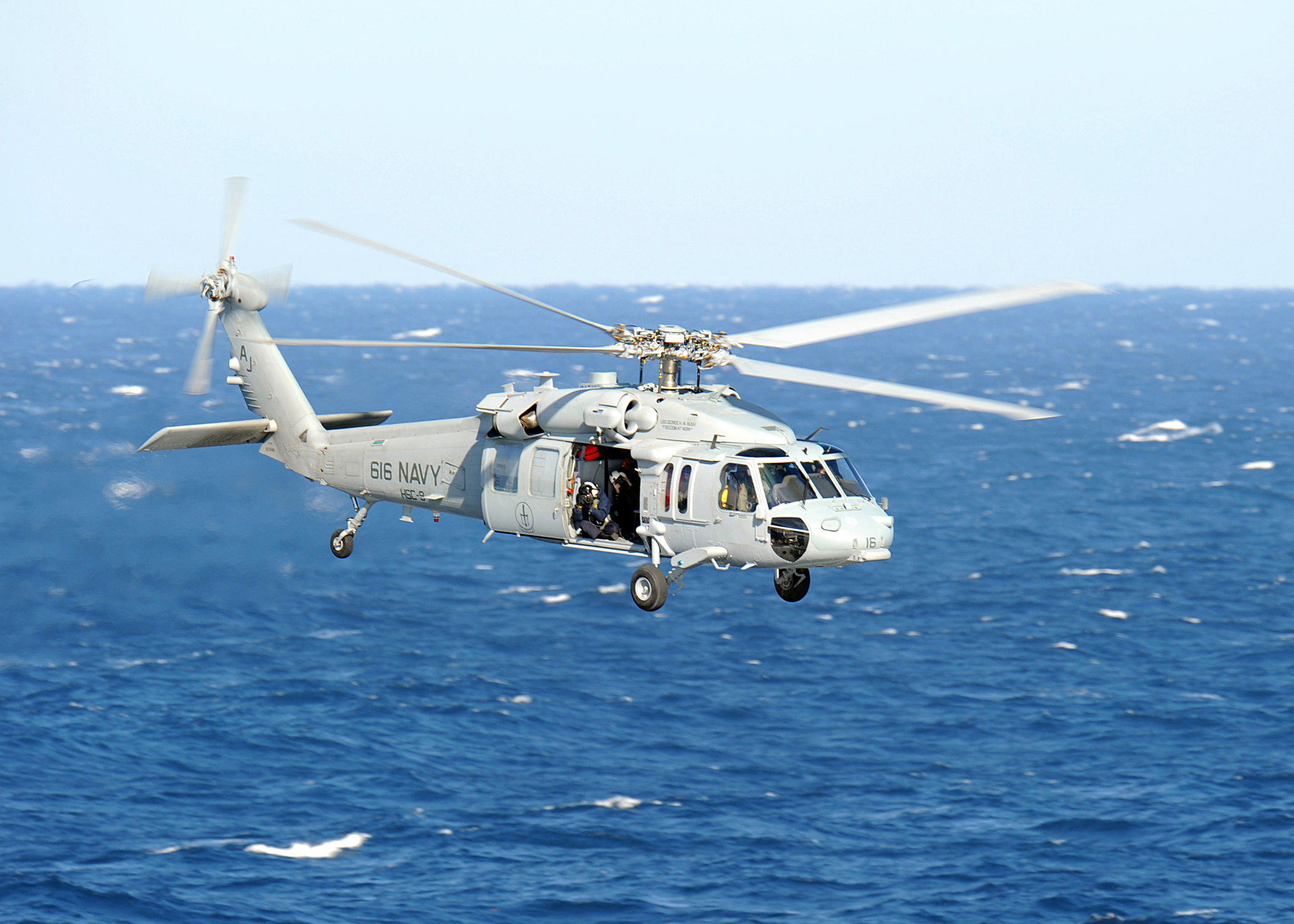
An MH-60S Sea Hawk of HSC-9 off USS George H.W. Bush

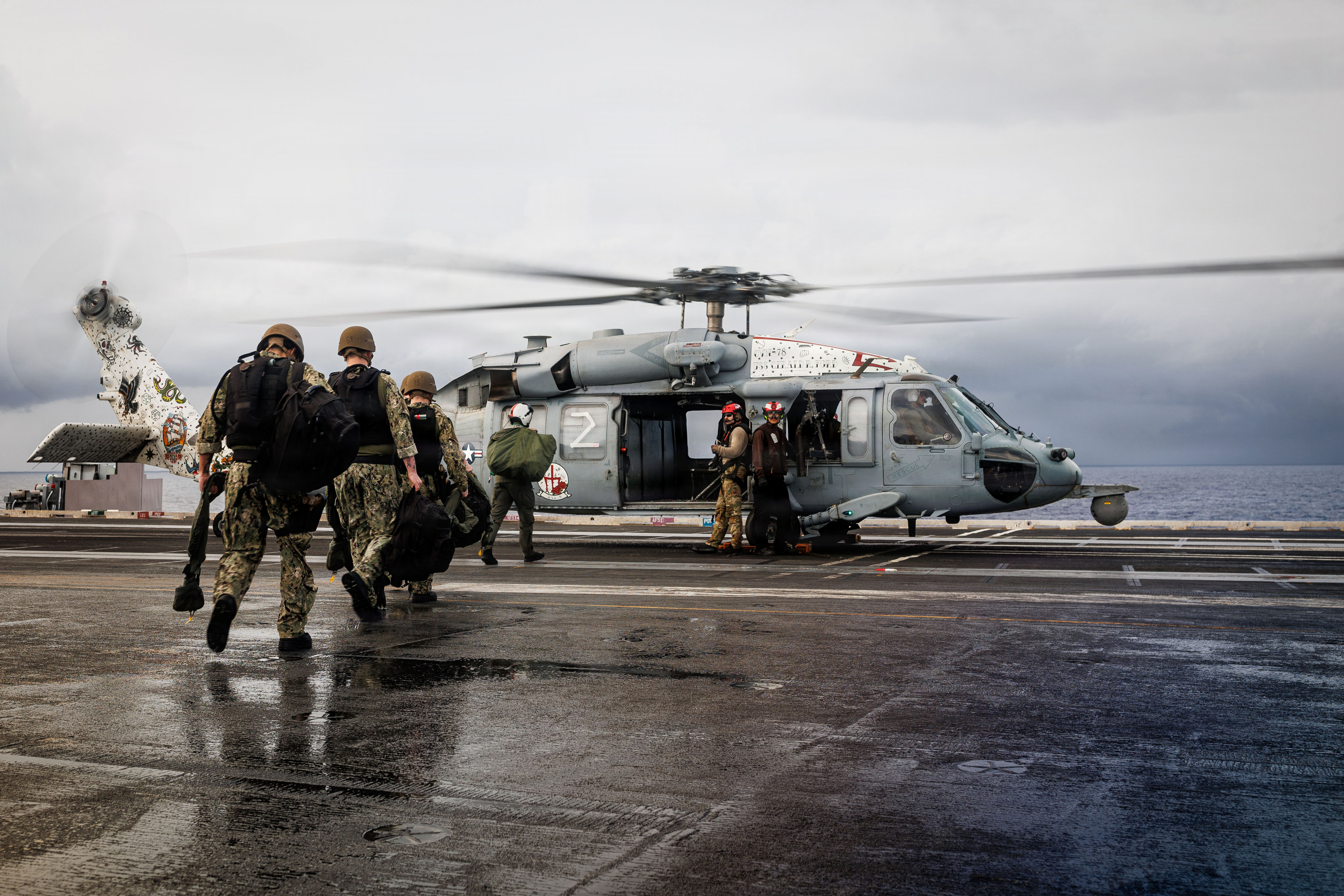
Sailors embark an MH-60S Sea Hawk of HSC-9 aboard USS Gerald R. Ford in 2026

On 16 April 2009, the Tridents returned home to Naval Air Station Jacksonville, Florida, from their final cruise as a Helicopter Anti-Submarine Squadron. During this year, the Tridents received the Jimmy Thach award for excellence in Anti-Submarine Warfare, an end cap to the squadron's legacy as an Anti-Submarine squadron. In May, the squadron started its permanent duty station change from Naval Air Station Jacksonville to Naval Air Station Norfolk, Virginia and airframe change to the MH-60S Seahawk. On 1 June 2009, the Tridents were redesignated Helicopter Sea Combat Squadron NINE (HSC-9).

On 13 January 2010, the Tridents sent two helicopters in support of Operation Unified Response, providing humanitarian aid and disaster relief following the devastating Haiti earthquake. Squadron personnel spent three months deployed aboard USS Carl Vinson and USS Bataan off the coast of Haiti, delivering over 280,000 pounds (130,000 kg) of disaster relief supplies and completing 240 MEDEVAC missions on the beleaguered island. The Tridents also brought ashore over 556,000 pounds (252,000 kg) of sustainment supplies and made 1,300 passenger transfers in support of the Operation.

HSC-9 was reassigned to Carrier Airwing 8 embarked in USS George H.W. Bush, deploying to the Mediterranean Sea and the Persian Gulf in 2011, 2014, and 2017. In 2021, CVW-8 was re-assigned to USS Gerald R. Ford.

In November 2025, HSC-9 within CVW-8 onboard the USS Gerald R Ford were re-tasked from their scheduled deployment in the Mediterranean and sent to the Caribbean to support Operation Southern Spear. After completing their support of Southern Spear in early February 2026, HSC-9 and CVW-8 were again deployed across the Atlantic and into the Mediterranean to support potential combat operations against Iran.

In late Feb 2026, HSC-9 and their MH-60Ss undertook combat sorties within Operation Epic Fury against Iran. Combat sorties off the Ford began from the Eastern Mediterranean and moved to the Red Sea after close to a week of combat.

== Squadron aircraft ==
Piasecki HUP Retriever, 1952-1953
Sikorsky HO4S, 1954-1956
Sikorsky HSS Seabat,

- HSS-1, 1956-1958
- HSS-1N, 1958-1961

Sikorsky H-3 Sea King

- HSS-2/SH-3A, 1961-1967 (designation changed from HSS-2 to SH-3A in Sep 1962)
- SH-3D, 1967-1979
- SH-3H, 1979-1991

Sikorsky SH-60 Seahawk

- SH-60F, 1991–2009
- HH-60H, 1991–2009
- MH-60S, 2009–present

== Squadron awards ==
SAR Excellence Award

"Golden Wrench" Maintenance Award

2012 "Battle E"

== See also ==
- CVW-8
- History of the United States Navy
- Helicopter Squadrons
