= VAW-124 =

Airborne Command & Control Squadron 124
- VAW-124 Insignia
- Active: 1 September 1967 - present
- Country: United States of America
- Branch: United States Navy
- Type: Airborne Early Warning
- Part of: Carrier Air Wing 8
- Garrison/HQ: Naval Station Norfolk
- Nicknames: "Bullseye Hummers" "Bear Aces"
- Aircraft: E-2D Hawkeye
- Engagements: Vietnam War; Operation Desert Shield; Operation Desert Storm; Operation Deny Flight; Operation Deliberate Force; Operation Southern Watch; Operation Iraqi Freedom; Operation Enduring Freedom; Operation New Dawn; Operation Inherent Resolve; Operation Southern Spear; Operation Epic Fury
- Decorations: Battle Efficiency Award (14); Safety "S" Award (10)

Aircraft flown
- Electronic warfare: E-2 Hawkeye

Airborne Command & Control Squadron 124 (VAW-124) "Bear Aces" is a United States Navy airborne early warning and control squadron based at Naval Air Station Norfolk, Norfolk, Virginia (United States). It flies the Northrop Grumman E-2D Hawkeye and is currently attached to Carrier Air Wing 8 (CVW-8).

== Squadron history ==
=== 1960s ===
Carrier Airborne Early Warning Squadron 124 (VAW-124) was commissioned on 1 September 1967 and nicknamed the "Bullseye Hummers". In 1968, the squadron was assigned to Attack Carrier Air Wing 7 (CVW-7) and deployed aboard USS Independence.

=== 1970s ===
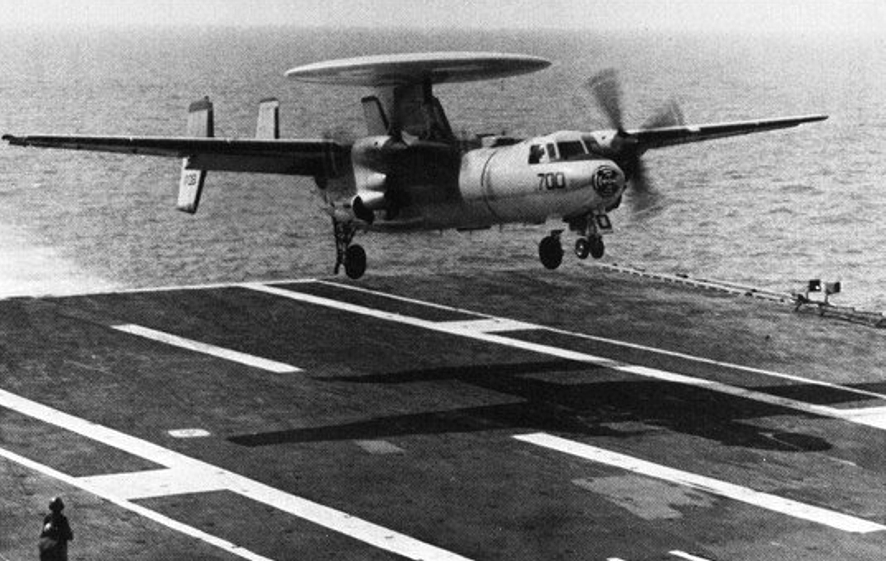
E-2B Hawkeye of VAW-124 landing on USS America in 1971

In April 1970, VAW-124 deployed with CVW-9 aboard USS America to Southeast Asia. In June 1972, VAW-124 embarked again aboard USS America for an extended Western Pacific deployment. Seven line periods and 147 combat days later, VAW-124 was present in the Gulf of Tonkin when the Paris Peace Accords were signed on 28 January 1973.

VAW-124 deployed with CVW-6 aboard USS America in the summer of 1976 and again in October 1977. The squadron was awarded the COMNAVAIRLANT Battle Efficiency Award and the Command Retention Silver Anchor Award in recognition of accomplishments during the year.

=== 1980s ===
In December 1980, the squadron received immediate deployment orders to NAS Keflavik, Iceland. As a result of numerous VAW-124 directed intercepts of Soviet TU-95 "Bear" reconnaissance aircraft, the squadron acquired the new nickname "Bear Aces."

On 19 August 1981, during the Gulf of Sidra incident, F-14 Tomcats under the control of a VAW-124 intercepted and shot down two Libyan SU-22 "Fitter" fighter aircraft. In June 1985, VAW-124 provided tracking of hijacked TWA Flight 847 as it crisscrossed the Mediterranean. The squadron was awarded their second COMNAVAIRLANT Battle Efficiency Award at the conclusion of 1987 and completed over sixteen years and 32,000 hours of mishap-free flying.

=== 1990s ===
On 21 January 1991, CVW-8 launched its first major strike of Operation Desert Storm with the squadron providing AEW, command and control, and search and rescue coordination. When the cease-fire went into effect on 28 February, the squadron had flown a total of 331 combat sorties and over 1150 combat hours in support of 1220 strikes against 531 targets in the Kuwait Theater of Operations, the most combat hours and combat sorties of any E-2C squadron, over 750 of the combat hours were flown in a single thirty-day period. After transiting the Suez Canal on 20 April, USS Theodore Roosevelt assumed station northeast of Cyprus between Turkey and Syria to lead a multi-national Operation Provide Comfort. On 26 June 1991, the squadron returned to its home port. In August, VAW-124 was awarded the 1991 AEW Excellence Award by VADM Anthony Less, Commander, U.S. Naval Air Force Atlantic Fleet. This award is given annually to the finest E-2C squadron in the Navy.

In April 1999, VAW-124 departed Norfolk on a combat deployment aboard USS Theodore Roosevelt. The squadron flew combat missions during Operation Allied Force against targets in Kosovo. Transiting to the Persian Gulf, the squadron completed the deployment enforcing the no-fly zone over Iraq in Operation Southern Watch.

=== 2000s ===
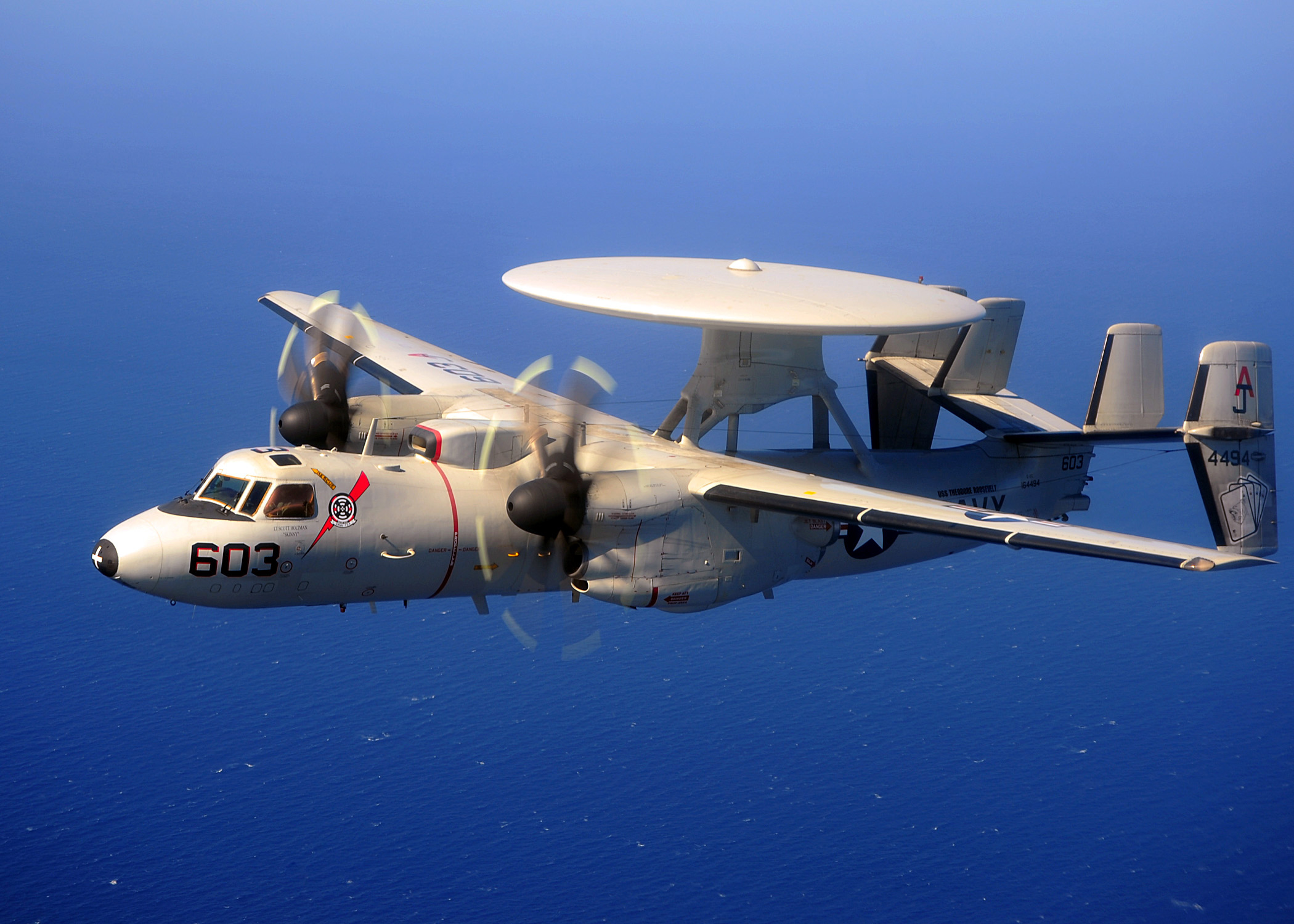
VAW-124 E-2C flies over the Gulf of Oman, 2009.

VAW-124 left home again in April 2001 aboard USS Enterprise. After several months of operations in the North Sea and Mediterranean, the squadron flew missions in support of Operation Southern Watch over Iraq. In September, with their mission complete, USS Enterprise headed south towards Cape Town, a rare African port call. However, due to the September 11 attacks, USS Enterprise would not make it to Cape Town and instead took station in the Northern Arabian Sea as VAW-124 and CVW-8 prepared for what would become Operation Enduring Freedom.

During the normal workup cycle in early January 2003, while preparing for a June 2003 deployment, the squadron deployed to the Mediterranean on board USS Theodore Roosevelt in support of the escalating situation that eventually developed into the Iraq War.

VAW-124 departed Norfolk in September 2005 to support Operation Sea Dragon Three in the Persian Gulf. During their six and a half month deployment, VAW-124 provided Airborne Early Warning and Command and Control for CVW-8 and USS Theodore Roosevelt.

In September 2008 VAW-124 deployed on board USS Theodore Roosevelt. During this deployment, the squadron provided support for CVW-8 in support of Operation Enduring Freedom. Over the course of 7 months, the squadron provided Coalition forces with transit control for the Afghanistan Joint Operation Area as well as providing airborne command and control to conduct missions for Coalition forces on the ground. The squadron's intercept controllers also participated in Exercise Neon Falcon, a joint military training exercise between the U.S. Navy and Royal Bahraini Air Force and in Exercise Eastern Angler, a joint military training exercise between the U.S. Navy and Qatar Air Force. The squadron conducted over 400 sorties flying over 2000 flight hours and over 800 traps on board USS Theodore Roosevelt. The squadron also awarded the CNO Safety "S" on 13 April 2009.

=== 2010s ===
In 2011 the squadron deployed on board USS George H.W. Bush for her maiden deployment. During the deployment, Carrier Strike Group Two provided support of Exercise Saxon Warrior, Joint Task Force Horn of Africa and Operations Enduring Freedom and New Dawn. In addition to combat operations, the squadron supported Exercise Nautical Artist by sending a detachment of their aircrew to Saudi Arabia. The squadron also facilitated the drawdown of coalition forces in Iraq. During this deployment, the squadron completed 552 sorties and 2,643 mishap-free flight hours. In recognition of their performance, they received the 2011 Battle "E", 2011 COMACLOGWING East Coast Top Hook Award and the 2011 Blue "M".

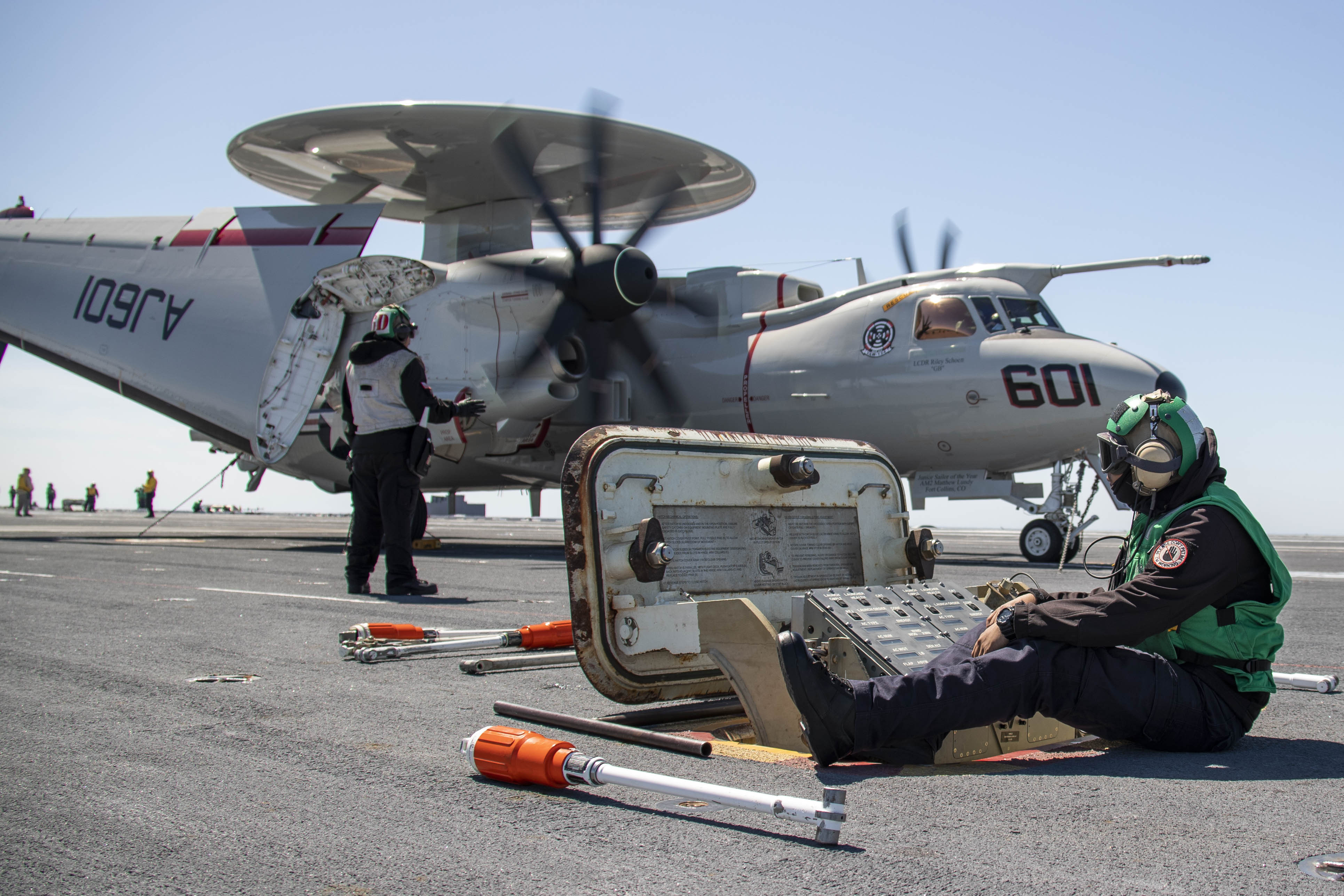
A VAW-124 E-2D on USS Gerald R. Ford, April 2022.

On 15 February 2014, the squadron again deployed on board USS George H.W. Bush. During the deployment, the squadron supported Operation Enduring Freedom until the sudden collapse of the Government of Iraq resulted in USS George H.W. Bush being redeployed within 30 hours to Iraq. VAW-124 provided Tactical Command and Control during the initial response of Operation Inherent Resolve and took part in the initial strikes against ISIS. The squadron returned to Norfolk on 15 November 2014. In 2015, the squadron was awarded the 2014 CNAL Battle "E," 2014 Safety "S," and 2014 Akers Award for AEW Excellence.

The last Group II variant of the E-2C in the US Navy was retired on 19 November 2019 at a ceremony onboard Navy Station Norfolk. The squadron then flew the E-2C Hawkeye 2000 until 1 June 2021. The squadron transitioned to the E-2D Hawkeye in 2021. At the same time CVW-8 was reassigned to USS Gerald R. Ford.

Since 1967, all VAW-squadrons were designated "Carrier Airborne Early Warning Squadron". Sometime in 2021, the designation changed to "Airborne Command & Control Squadron".

=== 2020s ===
In November 2025, VAW-124 within CVW-8 onboard the USS Gerald R Ford were re-tasked from their scheduled deployment in the Mediterranean and sent to the Caribbean to support Operation Southern Spear. After completing their support of Southern Spear in early February 2026, VAW-125 and CVW-8 were again deployed across the Atlantic and into the Mediterranean to support potential combat operations against Iran.

In late Feb 2026, VAW-124 and their E2-Ds undertook combat sorties within Operation Epic Fury against Iran. Combat sorties off the Ford began from the Eastern Mediterranean and moved to the Red Sea after close to a week of combat.

== See also ==
- History of the United States Navy
- List of United States Navy aircraft squadrons
