= Carrier Air Wing Eight =

- CVW-8 insignia
- Active: 9 April 1951 – present
- Country: United States
- Branch: United States Navy
- Type: Carrier air wing
- Part of: United States Fleet Forces Command
- Garrison/HQ: NAS Oceana
- Tail Code: AJ
- Engagements: World War II; Vietnam War; Operation Eagle Claw; Gulf of Sidra incident (1981); Multinational Force in Lebanon; Operation Desert Shield; Operation Desert Storm; Operation Southern Watch; Operation Provide Comfort; Operation Deny Flight; Operation Allied Force; Operation Enduring Freedom; Operation Iraqi Freedom; Operation Inherent Resolve; Operation Southern Spear; Operation Epic Fury
- Decorations: Presidential Unit Citation; Navy Unit Commendation

Carrier Air Wing Eight (CVW-8) is a United States Navy aircraft carrier air wing based at Naval Air Station Oceana, Virginia. The air wing is at present not attached to a carrier

== Mission ==
The mission of Carrier Air Wing Eight is:

"[T]o conduct offensive and defensive air operations against land and sea targets, as directed by higher authority, while also providing Carrier Strike Group defense. Currently assigned to Commander, Carrier Strike Group TWO, CVW-8 employs a mix of sophisticated aircraft to perform strike warfare, amphibious warfare, electronic warfare, airborne early warning, airborne command and control, sea control, air refueling, antisubmarine warfare and combat search and rescue missions."

== Subordinate units ==
CVW-8 consists of six squadrons.

Code	Insignia	Squadron	Nickname	Assigned aircraft
VFA-87		Strike Fighter Squadron 87	Golden Warriors	F/A-18E Super Hornet
VFA-213		Strike Fighter Squadron 213	Black Lions	F/A-18F Super Hornet
VAW-124		Carrier Airborne Early Warning Squadron 124	Bear Aces	E-2D Hawkeye
VAQ-142		Electronic Attack Squadron 142	Gray Wolves	EA-18G Growler
VRC-40		Fleet Logistics Support Squadron 40 Det. 2	Rawhides	C-2A Greyhound
HSC-9		Helicopter Sea Combat Squadron 9	Tridents	MH-60S Seahawk
HSM-70		Helicopter Maritime Strike Squadron 70	Spartans	MH-60R Seahawk

== History ==
=== 1940s ===
The first air group to carry the CVG-8 designation existed from June 1943 to November 1945. Carrier Air Group 8 (CVG-8) moved to the newly commissioned aircraft carrier USS Intrepid (CV-11) in Norfolk, Virginia in November 1943. After exercises in the Caribbean and passing through the Panama Canal, CVG-8 left the carrier in January 1944 in Pearl Harbor. Here the carrier USS Bunker Hill (CV-17) took over the squadron in March 1944. From this carrier the squadron flew attacks on the Palau Islands, Yap, Ulithi Atoll and Woleai on 30 March and 1 April 1944. A month later attacks were flown on Truk, Satawan and Ponape as well as Hollandia Bay in New Guinea. Between 12 June and 10 August CVG-8 was deployed in the conquest of the Marianas and took part in the Battle of the Philippine Sea and the naval and air battle in Leyte Gulf. In September, the squadron operated in the western Carolines, and in October and November it participated in raids on Okinawa, Luzon, and Formosa. For its operations on Bunker Hill, Carrier Air Group 8 (CVG-8) received a Presidential Unit Citation.

=== 1950s ===
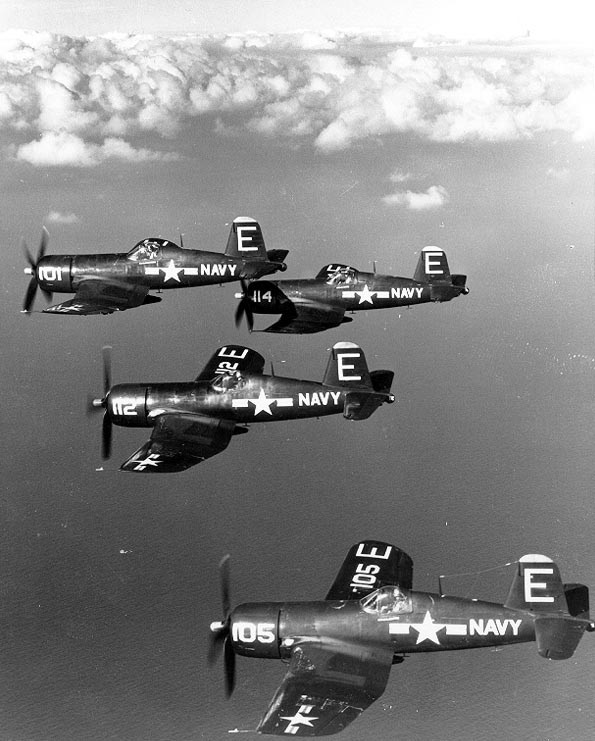
F4U-4 Corsairs fromCVG-8 1951

The second air group to carry the CVG-8 designation was created 9 April 1951 and has been in continuous operation since that date. CVG-8 was established on 9 April 1951 as Carrier Air Group Eight (CVG-8) Most of the wing's squadrons were Naval Reserve squadrons. CVG-8 made its first deployment to the Mediterranean Sea aboard USS Tarawa in 1951–52. Up to 1957, CVG-8 made three deployments aboard the aircraft carriers USS Coral Sea, USS Lake Champlain, and USS Intrepid, followed by the shakedown cruise aboard the newly commissioned USS Ranger in late 1957. The following year, CVG-8 was assigned to USS Forrestal. (it was the second air group to carry the CVG-8 designation; the first CVG-8 existed from June 1943 to November 1945) and has been in continuous operation since that date.

=== 1960s ===
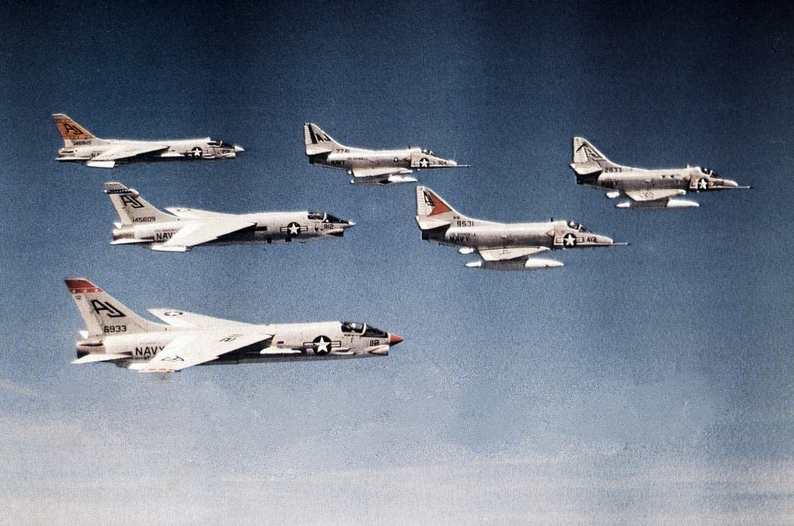
CVW-8 aircraft in flight, while assigned to USS Shangri-La in 1968

Carrier Air Group 8 was assigned to Forrestal until mid-1966, making five deployments to the Mediterranean Sea. On 20 December 1963, CVG-8 was redesignated Carrier Air Wing 8 (CVW-8). The air wing was reassigned to the much smaller Essex-class aircraft carrier USS Shangri-La in 1966, which necessitated the replacement of the F-4B Phantom II fighter with F-8D Crusaders. CVW-8 made three deployments to the Mediterranean Sea aboard Shangri-La.

=== 1970s ===
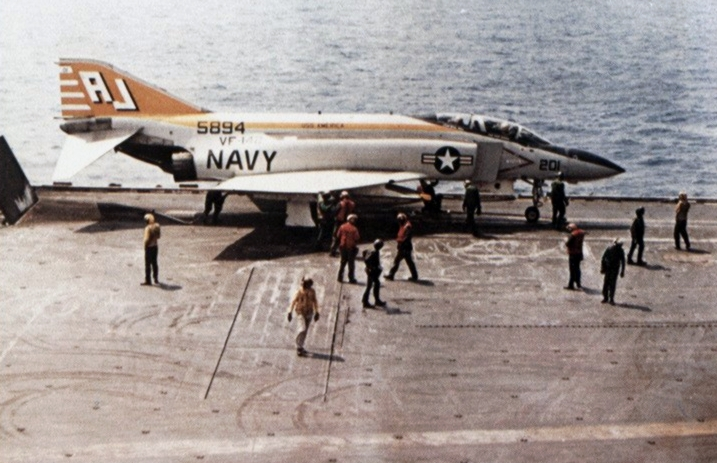
An VF-142 F-4J Phantom on USS America in 1974

From 5 March to 17 December 1970, CVW-8 made its first combat deployment to Vietnam. This was to be the last deployment of Shangri-La which was decommissioned in 1971. The air wing was reassigned to the USS America in 1971. All of its squadrons were replaced and received the latest models of the F-4 Phantom II, A-7 Corsair II and A-6 Intruder. In 1971 America went to the Mediterranean Sea, again, before being deployed to Vietnam from 5 June 1972 to 24 March 1973. The wing returned to the Mediterranean aboard America in 1975, before being reassigned to the nuclear-powered USS Nimitz in 1975.

==== Iran ====
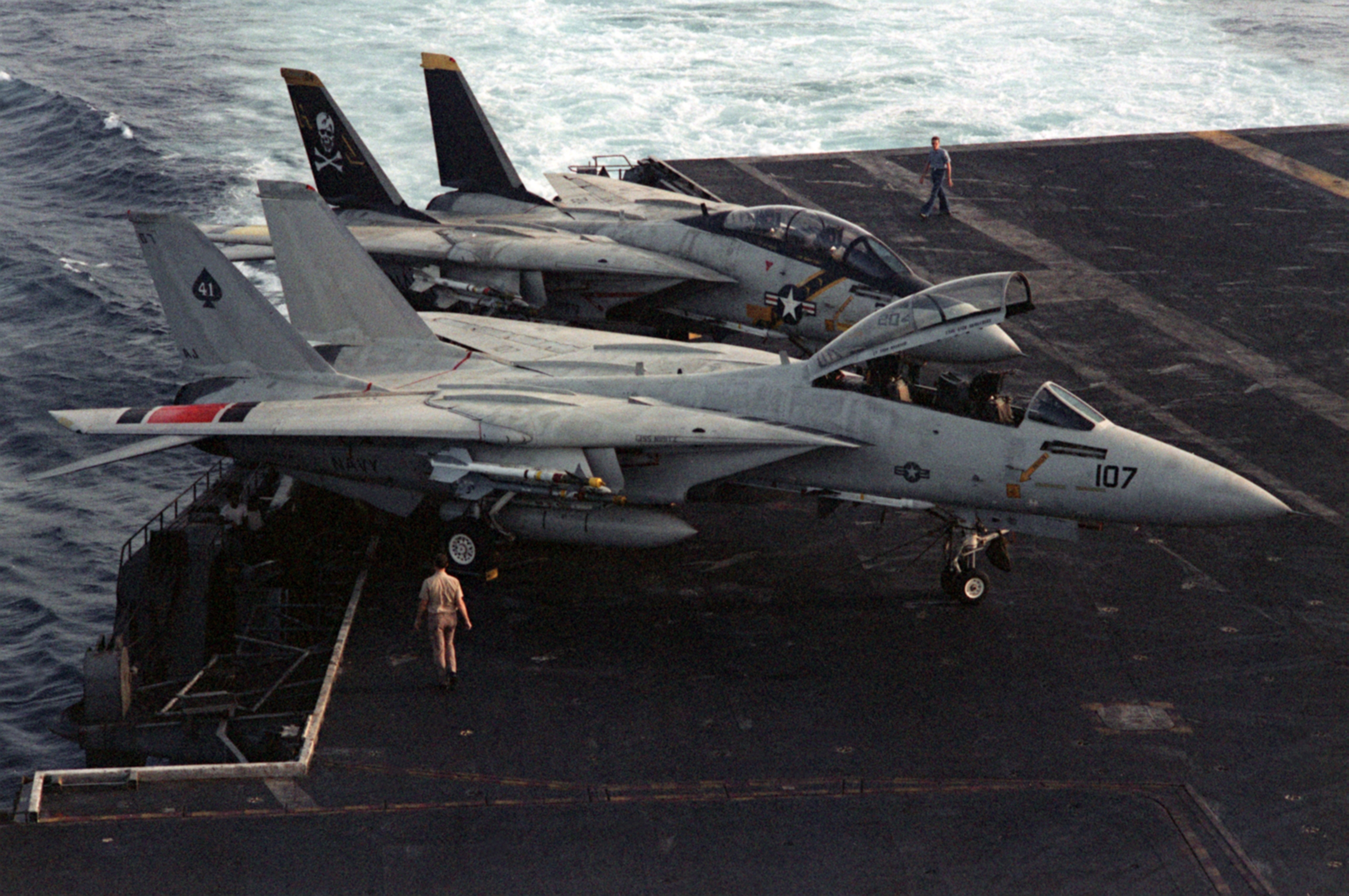
Tomcats of VF-41 and VF-84 during Operation Eagle Claw in 1980

Between June 1976 and May 1980, CVW-8 embarked on board Nimitz for three Mediterranean deployments. CVW-8 made a special appearance in the 1980 movie The Final Countdown. During their third Mediterranean deployment and in response to the Iranian hostage crisis and the Soviet invasion of Afghanistan, Nimitz with CVW-8 embarked left Naples, Italy in January 1980 and sailed around the Cape of Good Hope into the Indian Ocean. Established at "Gonzo Station," the air wing supported the Iranian hostage rescue attempt, Operation Eagle Claw, while remaining at-sea for more than 140 consecutive days. Returning to the United States in May 1980, CVW-8 embarked once again in USS Nimitz for the North Atlantic NATO exercise "Teamwork 80" from August to November 1980.

=== 1980s ===
CVW-8 embarked on Nimitz again in April 1981 for Caribbean operations, followed by another Sixth Fleet Mediterranean deployment. It was during this deployment that two CVW-8 F-14s from Fighter Squadron 41 engaged and destroyed two Libyan Sukhoi Su-22 aircraft following an unprovoked air-to-air missile attack over the international waters of the Gulf of Sidra.

==== Lebanon ====
Returning to Norfolk, Virginia, CVW-8 embarked in the Navy's newest carrier, USS Carl Vinson for her maiden voyage in March 1982. CVW-8 squadrons returned to Nimitz later in 1982 for Carrier Refresher Training followed by Caribbean operations and an extended Mediterranean deployment from November 1982 to May 1983 which included air operations in support of the multi-national force in Beirut, Lebanon.

In March 1985, CVW-8 embarked again on USS Nimitz for a Mediterranean deployment which included participation in several exercises including Distant Hammer, Poop Deck, and Bright Star. During this deployment, USS Nimitz and CVW-8 were stationed off the coast of Beirut, Lebanon for 69 consecutive days during the terrorist hijacking of a TWA airliner. The prompt response and threat of contingency strike operations by USS Nimitz and CVW-8 helped coerce the Iranian-backed terrorists into releasing their hostages.

In December 1986, CVW-8 embarked on USS Nimitz for the last time and deployed to the Mediterranean Sea. At the end of this deployment USS Nimitz team sailed around the tip of South America as the carrier changed its homeport from Norfolk, Virginia to Everett, Washington. In June 1987, CVW-8 aircraft launched for the last time from USS Nimitz while off the coast of San Diego, California to return to their respective homeports.

The air wing embarked in USS Theodore Roosevelt in August 1988 for Teamwork 88, the largest multi-national exercise of the decade and operated in the North Atlantic with a port call in Wilhelmshaven, West Germany. In December 1988, CVW-8 embarked on Theodore Roosevelt for a Mediterranean deployment where they participated in ten NATO exercises. The air wing distinguished itself during this deployment by flying over 22,000 flight hours and 10,000 sorties without a mishap.

=== Gulf War ===
Following the August 1990 invasion of Kuwait by Iraqi armor and infantry forces, CVW-8 rapidly prepared for possible combat operations. In four short months, intense training enabled Theodore Roosevelt and CVW-8 to deploy on 28 December to join five other U.S. Carrier Battle Groups in the largest display of sea power since World War II for Operation Desert Storm.

After participating in combat operations in Iraq in support of Operations Desert Storm and Provide Comfort, CVW-8 returned home on 28 June 1991 for a brief standdown. During the winter of 1992, CVW-8 provided opposition forces from Roosevelt Roads, Puerto Rico in support of Carrier Battle Group training. In July 1992, the air wing was the first Air Wing to receive and incorporate a Marine Corps FA-18C squadron, the "Checkerboards" of Marine Fighter Attack Squadron 312 (VMFA-312). In December 1992, USS Theodore Roosevelt and CVW-8 operated for the very first time in Naval Aviation history as a Special Marine Air / Ground Task Force.

Carrier Air Wing Eight embarked aboard Theodore Roosevelt in March 1993 and participated in Operation Provide Comfort and Deny Flight in support of NATO sanctions in Bosnia-Herzegovina. In June 1993, the team passed through the Suez Canal for Red Sea duty in support of Operation Southern Watch over Iraq. CVW-8 returned to the Adriatic Sea in July 1993 to continue NATO operational tasking until returning to Norfolk, Virginia in September 1993.

=== Bosnia ===
CVW-8 embarked again aboard Theodore Roosevelt in March 1995 and operated in the Mediterranean Sea, North Red Sea, Persian Gulf and Adriatic Sea. CVW-8 responded to threats from Iraq by conducting joint operations with the Royal Jordanian Air Force and also enforced No-Fly Zones over Bosnia-Herzegovina as part of Operation Deny Flight. On 29 August 1995, CVW-8 commenced air-to-ground offensive operations in Bosnia-Herzegovina during Operation Deliberate Force to include the first ever Navy combat use of the GBU-24 2,000-pound (910 kg) laser-guided penetrator bomb and the first combat use of the F-14 "Tomcat" to deliver air-to-ground ordnance. USS Theodore Roosevelt and CVW-8 team returned home on 22 September 1995 and on 1 November 1995, CVW-8 was reassigned under the operational control of the John F. Kennedy Battle Group, forming the team of USS John F. Kennedy and CVW-8.

The air wing embarked in USS John C. Stennis in February 1996, for a Joint Fleet Exercise. This was followed by deployed operations to the North Atlantic while embarked in USS John F. Kennedy with port calls to Dublin, Ireland and Portsmouth, England.

In April 1997, CVW-8 embarked in USS John F. Kennedy for a Mediterranean Sea / Persian Gulf deployment. During this deployment, CVW-8 participated in numerous exercises and detachments including Infinite Acclaim, Beacon Flash and Invitex. During Invitex the Air Wing completed over 350 sorties including 203 sorties in a single day of surge operations. This deployment also included operations over Bosnia-Herzegovina in support of Operation Deliberate Guard and over Iraq in support of Operation Southern Watch.

In January 1999 CVW-8 deployed on Theodore Roosevelt and participated in Operation Allied Force during 55 consecutive days of combat, flying 4,300 sorties, logging 10,000 flight hours and dropped 800 tons of ordnance. The Air Wing came up with new tactics utilizing cooperative targeting between F-14s and F/A-18s. CVW-8 was also the first Air Wing to expend weapons in two theaters as they headed for the Persian Gulf to support Operation Southern Watch after the war in the Balkans had ended. They flew over 2,600 missions over Iraq.

=== Global War on Terror ===
In 2001, CVW-8 embarked aboard the USS Enterprise and completed a six and one half-month deployment culminating in the initial strikes of Operation Enduring Freedom in Afghanistan. The deployment began with detachments in Tunisia, Corsica, and Israel, as well as half-dozen port-visits throughout the Mediterranean. During the second half of the deployment, the Air Wing flew in support of Operation Southern Watch expending over 29,000 lb of ordnance against Iraqi targets. USS Enterprise and CVW-8 were wrapping up operations in the Fifth Fleet area of operations on 11 September 2001, remained on station and eventually flew 16 days of combat operations over Afghanistan to include 680 sorties that delivered over 770,000 lb of precision guided munitions during the initial stages of Operation Enduring Freedom.

On 19 February 2002, the Air Wing was reassigned back to the Theodore Roosevelt Battle Group. CVW-8 made some changes as VF-14 and VF-41 had begun transitioning to the F/A-18 Super Hornet and moved to CVW-11, VF-213 (formerly CVW-11) became part of CVW-8 instead. In July 2002, CVW-8 began accelerated work-up operations leading to a combat deployment in support of Operation Iraqi Freedom. In October 2002 CVW-8 integrated Strike Fighter Squadron Two Zero One (VFA-201), a reserve Navy FA-18A+ squadron, and embarked on USS Theodore Roosevelt in January 2003 for Caribbean training operations. Theodore Roosevelt and CVW-8 deployed to the Mediterranean Sea in January 2003 at the conclusion of Caribbean training operations and participated in combat operations in support of Operation Iraqi Freedom flying over 1,000 sorties and 5,000 hours that delivered over 1,000,000 pounds of precision-guided weapons. USS Theodore Roosevelt and CVW-8 returned from deployment in May 2003 and was chosen as the test platform for the Chief of Naval Operations Fleet Response Plan initiative.

In 2005, CVW-8 became the last carrier air wing to deploy with the F-14 Tomcat when it departed for the Persian Gulf with VF-31 and VF-213. Captain William Sizemore, Commander Carrier Air Wing Eight, landed the last F-14D Super Tomcat to participate in a combat mission when the last OIF line period concluded in February 2006. CVW-8 flew 16,000 sorties, logged 38,980 flight hours with a 97.3% sortie completion rate and dropped 61,000 pounds of ordnance.

CVW-8 and Theodore Roosevelt participated in Joint Task Force Exercise 08-4 Operation Brimstone off the coast of North Carolina between 21 and 31 July 2008. The British carrier HMS Ark Royal, the amphibious assault ship Iwo Jima with associated units and the Brazilian Navy frigate Greenhalgh and the French submarine Améthyste also participated in the event.

On 8 September 2008, CVW-8 deployed on board USS Theodore Roosevelt on a regularly scheduled deployment. On 4 October, the Theodore Roosevelt Carrier Group arrived in Cape Town, South Africa, the first visit by an American aircraft carrier since 1967 and three days later the carrier left Cape Town. CVW-8 and Theodore Roosevelt supported Operation Enduring Freedom and flew more than 3,100 sorties and dropped more than 59,500 pounds of ordnance while providing Close Air Support for ISAF-forces in Afghanistan. On 21 March 2009 Theodore Roosevelt was relieved by USS Dwight D. Eisenhower.

On 29 August 2009 Theodore Roosevelt entered Northrop Grumman Shipbuilding at Newport News, Virginia, to begin a Refueling and Complex Overhaul (RCOH) which is scheduled to last until February 2013. CVW-8 was assigned to USS George H.W. Bush.

On 11 May 2011, the squadrons of CVW-8 embarked on USS George H.W. Bush's maiden deployment, scheduled to conduct operations in the US 5th and 6th Fleet areas of operations. During this deployment, CVW-8 commander Captain Jeff Davis completed his 1,000 flight deck landing ("trap") when he flew on board the carrier George H.W. Bush on 1 August 2011. CVW-8 deputy commander Captain Daniel W. Dwyer made his 1,000 trap on 18 July 2011.

Following the 2012-2013 deployment of Carrier Strike Group Three, the electronic-warfare squadron VAQ-131 was reassigned to Carrier Air Wing Eight based aboard the carrier George H.W. Bush. This reassign was originally slated to occur in January 2014 but changing operational requirements accelerated this reassignment until immediately after the end of the 2012-2013 deployment. Finally, the squadron transitioned from the EA-6B Prowler to the EA-18G Growler electronic-warfare aircraft.

CVW-8 made its next scheduled deployment aboard George H.W. Bush in the U.S. Navy's 5th and 6th Fleet areas of responsibility from 23 January to 21 August 2017. On 18 June 2017, a F/A-18E shot down a Syrian Air Force Su-22 in the Tabqa region.

In 2022, CVW-8 was assigned to the aircraft carrier USS Gerald R. Ford. Ford's Carrier Strike Group 12 left Naval Station Norfolk for her maiden deployment on 4 October 2022 to conduct operations and training exercises alongside NATO allies and partners throughout the Atlantic Ocean.

== Current force ==
=== Fixed-wing aircraft ===
- F/A-18E/F Super Hornet
- EA-18G Growler
- E-2C Hawkeye
- C-2A Greyhound

=== Rotary wing aircraft ===
- MH-60S Knighthawk
- MH-60R Seahawk

== First Carrier Air Group Eight ==
The first Carrier Air Group Eight was established on 1 June 1943 at Naval Air Station Norfolk, Virginia and was initially assigned to the USS Intrepid. During World War II, CVW-8 distinguished itself in combat in the Pacific, winning five Battle Stars and the Presidential Unit Citation for heroic combat action while embarked in USS Bunker Hill. The air group was disestablished on 23 November 1945 following World War II. The United States Navy regards this air group as a distinct unit and therefore it is not considered part of Carrier Air Wing Eight's official lineage.

== See also ==
- History of the United States Navy
- List of United States Navy Carrier air wings
- Carrier Strike Group 12
