= USS George H. W. Bush =

US Navy Nimitz-class aircraft carrier

USS George H. W. Bush (CVN-77)
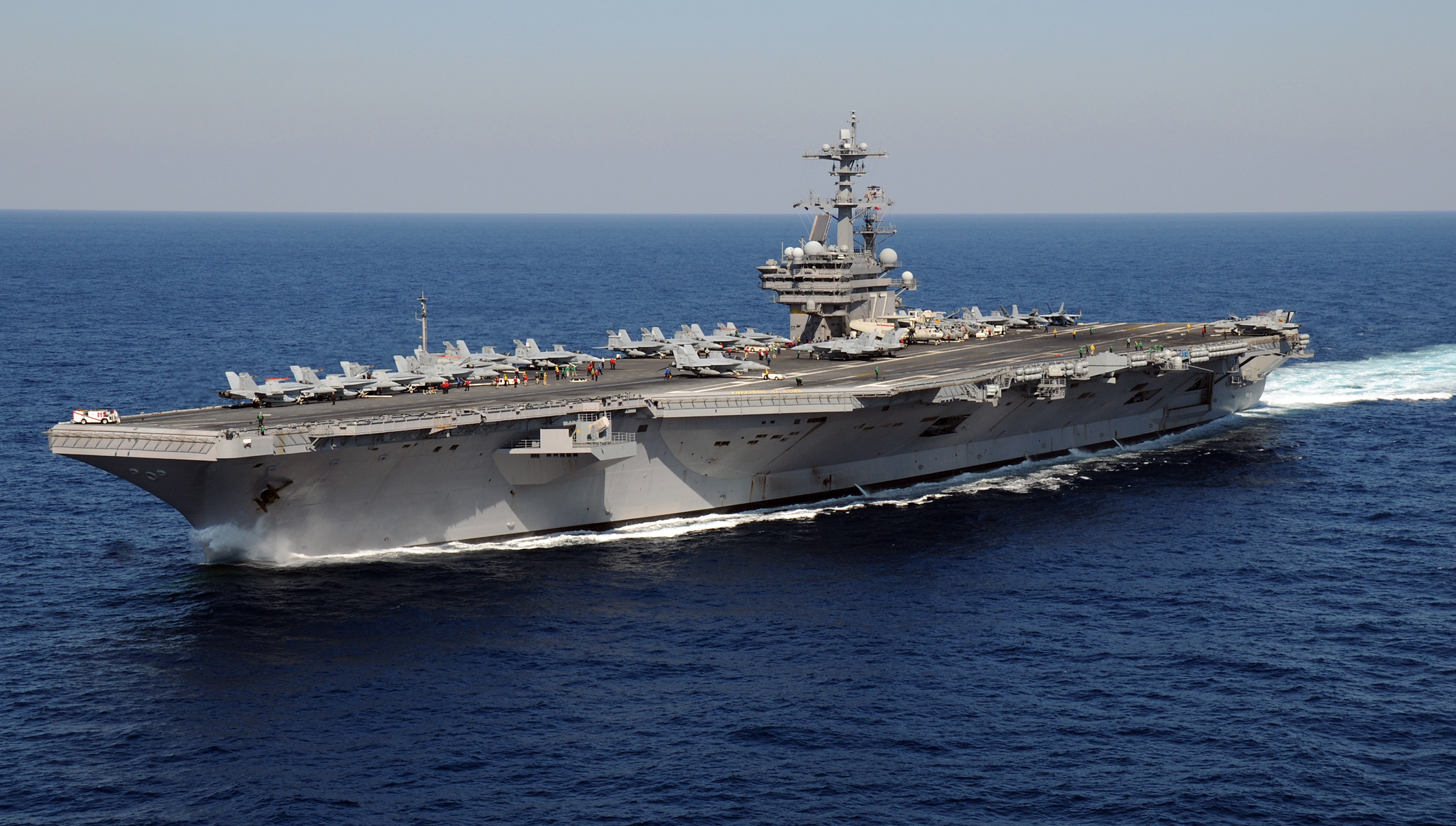
- USS George H. W. Bush in January 2011

History

United States
- Name: George H. W. Bush
- Namesake: George H. W. Bush
- Ordered: 26 January 2001
- Awarded: 26 January 2001
- Builder: Northrop Grumman Newport News
- Cost: $6.2 billion
- Laid down: 6 September 2003
- Launched: 9 October 2006
- Sponsored by: Dorothy Bush Koch
- Christened: 7 October 2006
- Acquired: 11 May 2009
- Commissioned: 10 January 2009
- Home port: Norfolk, Virginia
- Identification: MMSI number: 369970663; Callsign: NGHW; Hull number: CVN-77
- Motto: Freedom at Work
- Nickname(s): Avenger
- Status: in active service
- Badge

General characteristics
- Class & type: Nimitz-class aircraft carrier
- Displacement: 102,000 long tons (104,000 t)
- Length: Overall: 1,092 ft (332.8 m); Waterline: 1,040 ft (317.0 m)
- Beam: Overall: 252 ft (76.8 m); Waterline: 134 ft (40.8 m)
- Draft: Maximum navigational: 37 ft (11.3 m); Limit: 41 ft (12.5 m)
- Propulsion: 2 × Westinghouse A4W nuclear reactors (HEU 93.5%); 4 × steam turbines; 4 × shafts; 260,000 shp (190 MW)
- Speed: 30 knots (56 km/h; 35 mph)+
- Range: Unlimited distance; 20–25 years
- Complement: Ship's company: 3,532; Air wing: 2,480
- Sensors & processing systems: SPS-48E 3-D air search radar; SPS-49A(V)1 2-D air search radar; SPQ-9B fire control radar; 2 × SPN-46 air traffic control radars; SPN-43C air traffic control radar; SPN-41 instrument landing system radar; 3 × Mk 91 NSSM guidance systems; 3 × Mk 95 radars
- Electronic warfare & decoys: AN/SLQ-32A(V)4 countermeasures suite; SLQ-25A Nixie torpedo countermeasures
- Armament: 2 × Mk 29 ESSM launcher; 2 × RIM-116 Rolling Airframe Missile; 3 × Phalanx CIWS
- Armor: 2.5 in (64 mm) Kevlar over vital spaces
- Aircraft carried: 90 fixed wing and helicopters

USS George H. W. Bush (CVN-77) is the tenth and final Nimitz-class supercarrier of the United States Navy. It was named after the 41st president of the United States and 11th director of central intelligence George H. W. Bush, who was a naval aviator during World War II. The vessel's callsign is Avenger, named after the TBF Avenger aircraft flown by then-Lieutenant Bush in World War II. Construction began in 2003 at Northrop Grumman, in Newport News, Virginia, and was completed in 2009 at a cost of $6.2 billion. Its home port is Naval Station Norfolk, Virginia.

== Naming ==
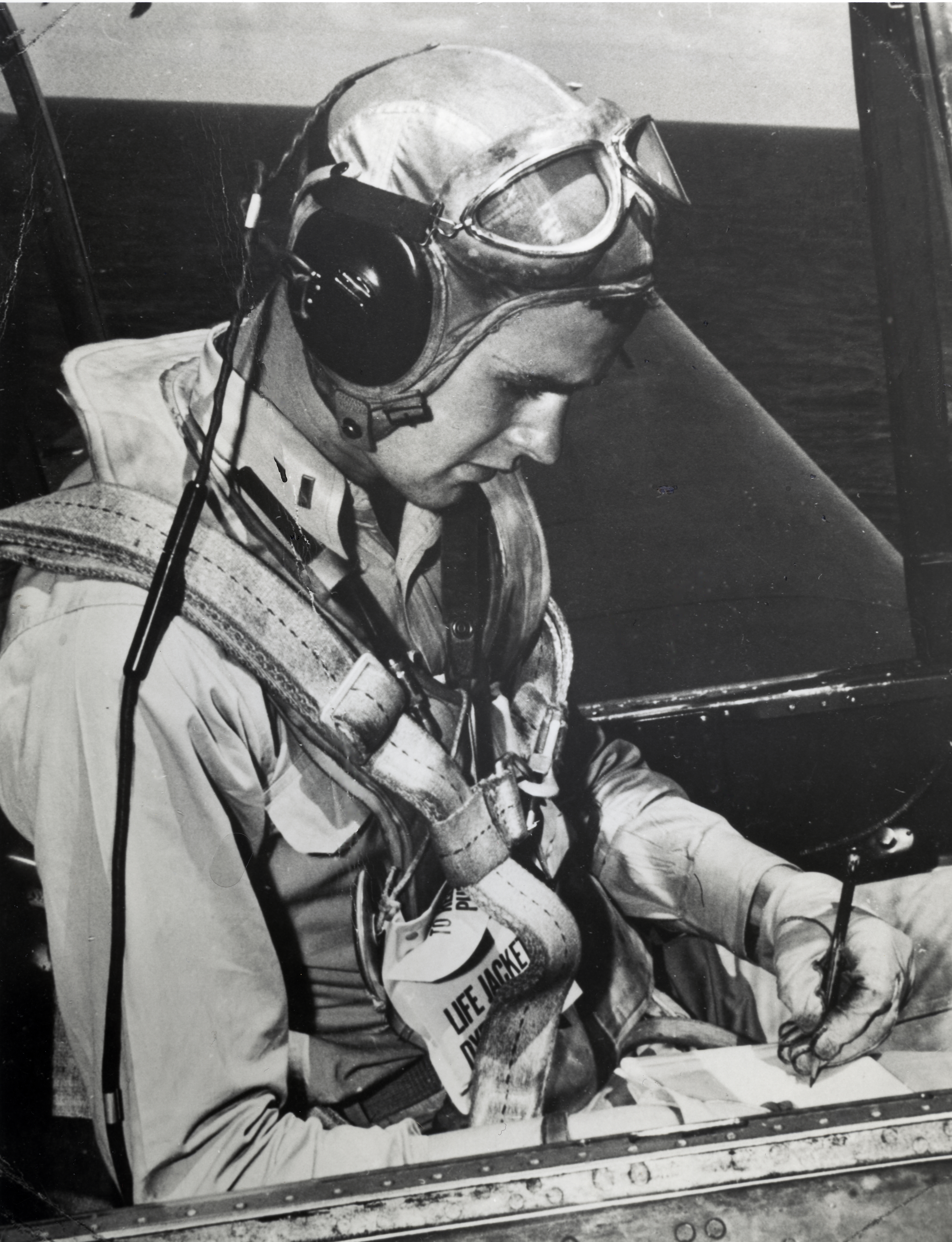
George H. W. Bush in a Grumman TBM Avenger during World War II

George H. W. Bush became one of the U.S. Navy's youngest pilots when he received his Naval Aviator wings and naval commission on 9 June 1943, three days before turning 19. He flew torpedo bombers off USS San Jacinto on active duty from August 1943 to September 1945 during World War II. On 2 September 1944, during a mission over the Pacific, Japanese anti-aircraft fire hit his plane. The Navy submarine USS Finback rescued him. He was awarded the Distinguished Flying Cross and three Air Medals for courageous service in the Pacific Theater.

USS George H. W. Bush is the second United States aircraft carrier to be named after a naval aviator (Forrestal was the first) and the second, following Ronald Reagan, to be named after a then living former president (Ronald Reagan was christened in 2001 while Reagan was still alive).

== Ship's seal ==
Each element of the seal is significant for its relevance to the ship's namesake, naval aviation, naval service, and the nation. There are six prominent features of the seal, beginning with the 41 white stars, symbolizing the ship's namesake (the 41st president). The rays of light that appear on the seal's horizon represent Bush's concept of a "thousand points of light", wherein he urged Americans to find meaning and reward by serving a purpose higher than themselves. The graphic depiction of the aircraft carrier reflects the carrier, as both a symbol and instrument of American strength as a force for freedom. Above the carrier are the overhead profiles of a TBM Avenger torpedo bomber (representing Bush's days as a Navy pilot), an F/A-18 Hornet strike fighter, and an F-35C Lightning II, superimposed one upon the other in reverse chronological order of the individual aircraft's service entry date, and in diminishing scale so each outline is contained within that of the newer aircraft.

Fouled anchors and shields, centered on naval aviators wings, honor the ship's namesake's aviation history. Finally, the motto "Freedom at Work" is adapted from Bush's inaugural speech, during which he said, "We know what works: Freedom works. We know what's right: Freedom is right."

== Description ==
George H. W. Bush measures 1,092 feet (333 m) and displaces over 100,000 tons, making her one of the world's largest warships (though she is slightly shorter than USS Enterprise). Her top speed exceeds 30 knots (56 km/h; 35 mph); powered with two nuclear reactors, she can operate for more than 20 years without refueling.

Several features differentiate CVN-77 from other ships in the Nimitz class.

=== Hull ===
New features include a bulbous bow design that provides more buoyancy to the forward end of the ship and improves hull efficiency, curved flight deck edges to reduce radar signature, a new underwater hull coating system, deck modernized coverings to reduce ship weight by 100 tons, low solar absorptive and anti-stain paint, a less cluttered hangar bay, and a new propeller design.

=== Island ===
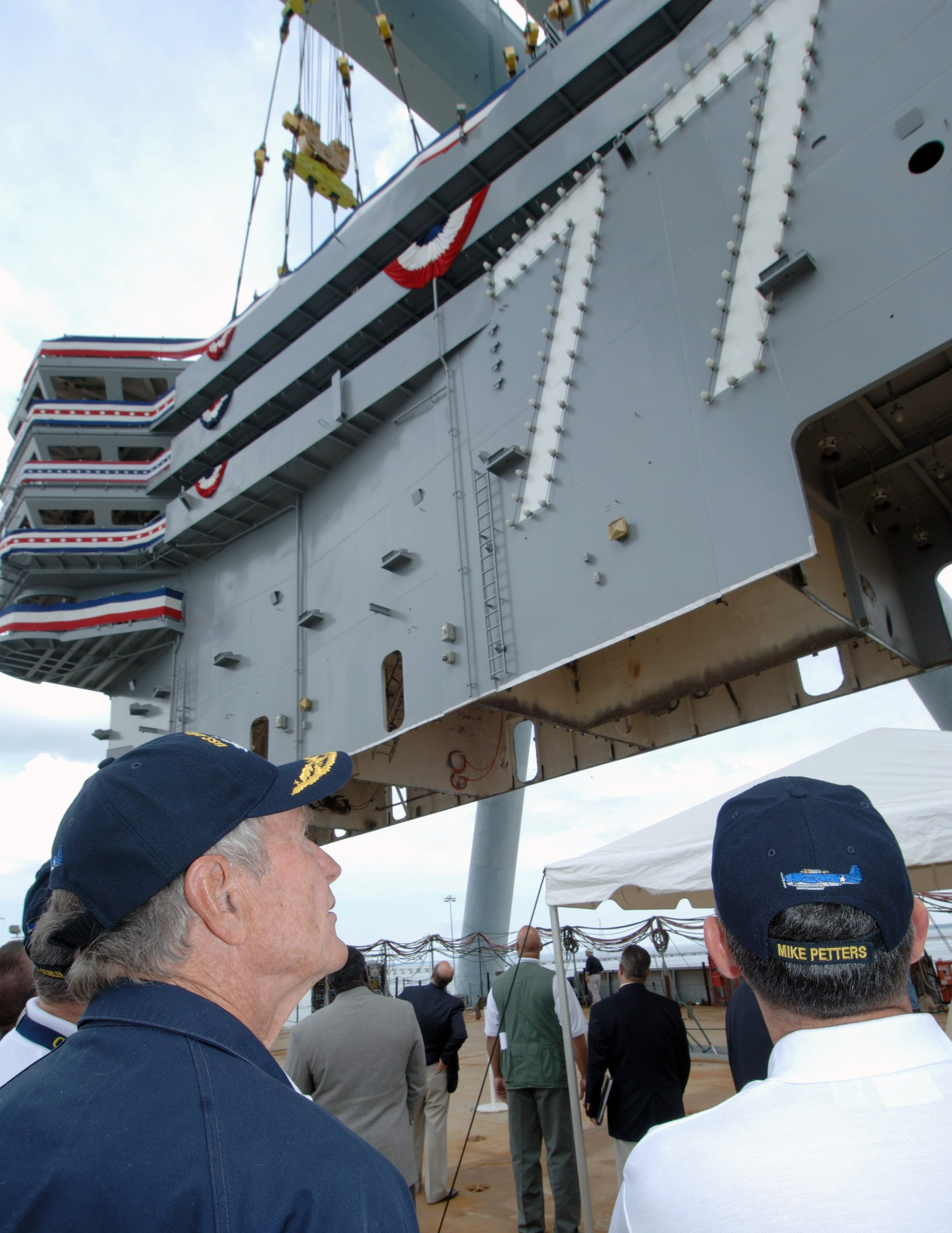
Placement of the 700-ton island onto the ship's flight deck in 2006

George H. W. Bush is the second carrier to have a modernized island, which includes a new radar tower (enclosed to reduce radar signature), navigation system upgrades, communication systems enhancements, and armored windows. The island is smaller and has been repositioned further aft to improve flight deck access and reduce signature and electronic self-interference.

=== Air operations ===
New air operations design features include an updated aviation fuel storage and distribution system, semi-automated refueling and servicing with new deck locations to provide faster, more efficient aircraft pit stops, requiring fewer people, modernized aircraft launch, and recovery equipment, and redesigned jet blast deflectors.

=== Environmental ===
Environmental upgrades have also been designed into the ship, including a vacuum collection/marine sanitation device (VC/MSD), a new marine sewage system that uses sea water in lieu of fresh water for lower maintenance costs. Many older ships in the U.S. Navy utilize a gravity-driven collection holding and transfer (CHT) system to handle sewage waste. Newer U.S. Navy ships, including now CVN-77, collect sewage waste by vacuum, allowing for greater flexibility in piping installation, smaller pipe sizes overall and reducing water consumption. The collection tanks of George H. W. Bush were modified to accommodate both the VCHT (Vacuum CHT) equipment and the elements of a marine sanitization device to treat the waste prior to discharge. George H. W. Bush is the only aircraft carrier in the U.S. Navy to combine the two technologies.

This new VC/MSD driven waste management system has, however, not been without problems. Reports began surfacing immediately after delivery in May 2009 of issues with the ship's toilet system. As of November 2011, the entire system has gone down at least twice, rendering all 423 commodes in the ship's 130 heads inoperable, with many more incidents that have rendered either half of the ship, or sections of the ship, without operating sanitary facilities. In one ship-wide incident, a repair crew spent 35 non-stop hours attempting to return the system to working order. The system is said to suffer breakdowns when inappropriate materials such as feminine hygiene products are flushed down the toilets. During a four-month maintenance period in the dock in 2012, anti-clog measures were installed in the ship's toilet disposal systems.

=== Electronics and communications ===
New electronics and communications technology, space rearrangement, operational procedure changes, advanced sensor technologies and maintenance systems have been incorporated to reduce manning costs. A new zonal electrical distribution system will keep problems from affecting other parts of the ship. Automated material movement devices, semi-autonomous, gravity compensated weapons handling devices, damage control automation systems and components have also been installed. Medical and dental equipment have been upgraded, integrated display screens in Damage Control Central have been modernized to improve data integration and display, and equipment in general shops has been modernized to improve productivity.

== History ==
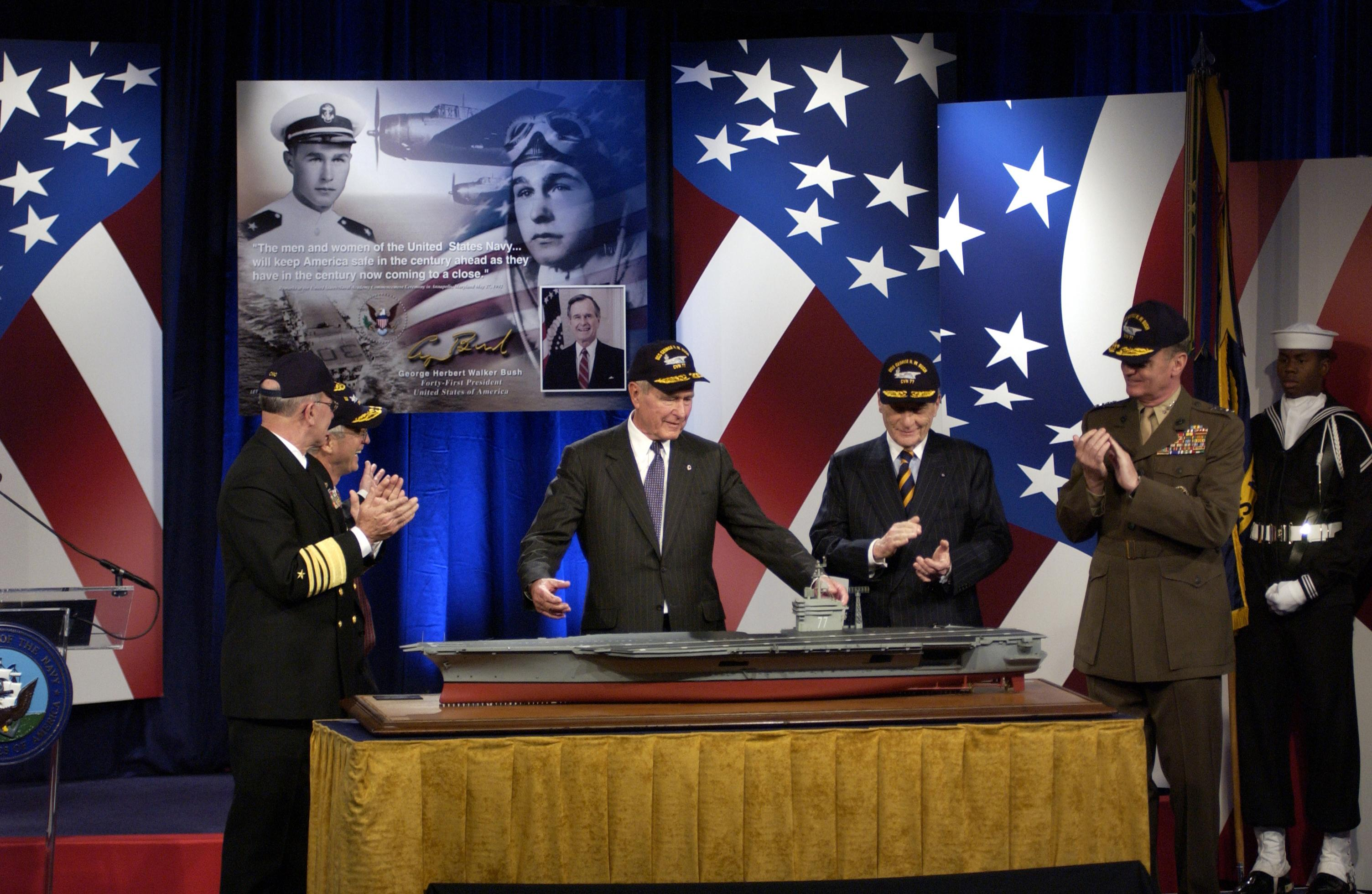
Pentagon naming ceremony in December 2002

The contract to build CVN-77 was awarded to Northrop Grumman Shipbuilding Newport News on 26 January 2001. A naming ceremony was held on 9 December 2002 at Northrop Grumman Newport News, with former president George H. W. Bush attending. Secretary of the Navy Gordon R. England, presided at the ceremony.

=== Construction ===
Construction took place at the Northrop Grumman Newport News shipyard's Dry Dock 12, the largest in the western hemisphere. The keel laying ceremony was held on 6 September 2003, with former president George H. W. Bush serving as the keynote speaker. Former First Lady Barbara Bush also attended with their daughter, Dorothy Bush Koch, the ship's sponsor. The former president authenticated the keel by chalking his initials onto a metal plate. His initials were then welded onto the plate, which was permanently affixed to the ship.

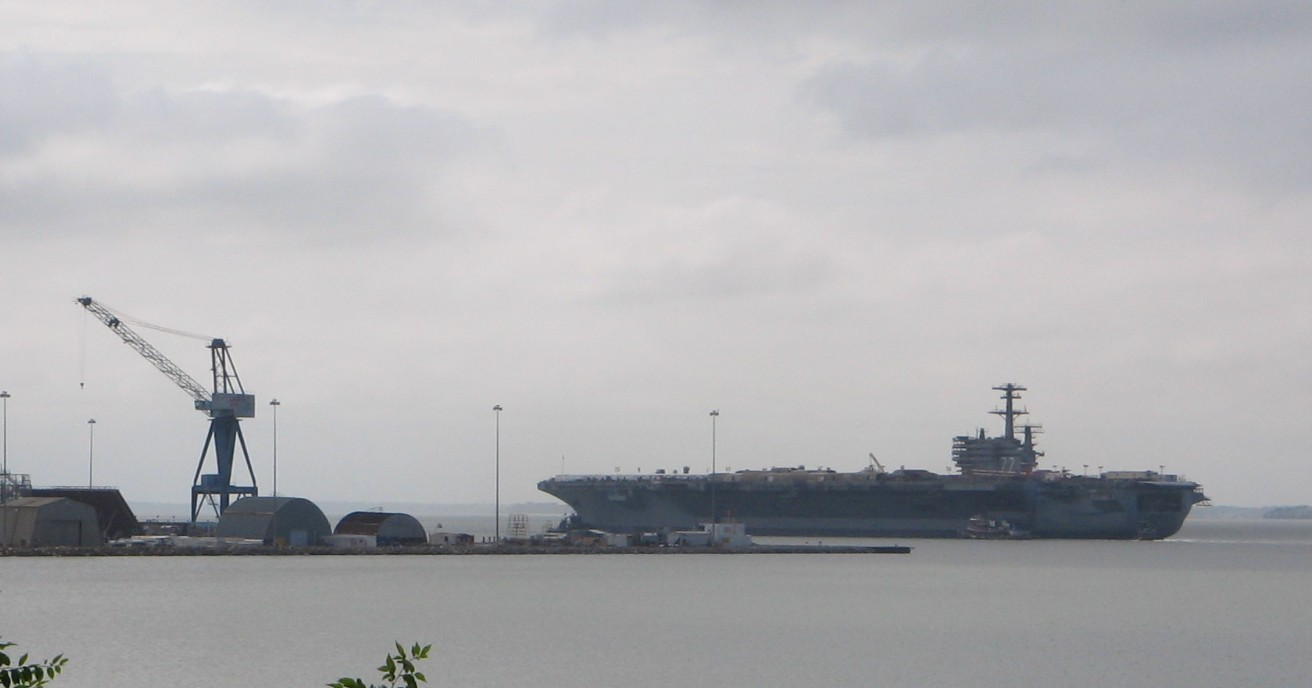
USS George H. W. Bush shortly after being released from dry dock for the first time

The ship was modularly constructed, where large sections are assembled and then lifted into place using a large crane. Major milestones in the construction include the bow placement in March 2005, followed by the island placement on 8 July 2006. The 700-short-ton (640 t; 620-long-ton) island was lifted onto the flight deck in a ceremony called "stepping the mast" which dates from antiquity and consists of placing coins or other items of significance under the step or bottom of a ship's mast during construction. Since at least the construction of USS Constitution in the 1790s, this tradition has been passed on as a symbol of good luck for U.S. Navy ships. George H. W. Bush participated in the event, placing his naval aviator wings underneath the island during the ceremony.

George H. W. Bush was christened on 7 October 2006. Former president George H. W. Bush attended the ceremony and became the first president in history to participate in the christening of his namesake ship. President George W. Bush also attended and honored his father during the ceremony as a special guest speaker. Other officials participating in the ceremony included Secretary of Defense Donald Rumsfeld, Secretary of the Navy Donald Winter; Virginia Senators John Warner and George Allen, Virginia Governor Tim Kaine, and Chief of Naval Operations Admiral Michael Mullen.

Other construction milestones included catapult system testing on the ship's flight deck on 25 January 2008. Former president George H. W. Bush signaled the launch of two "dead loads" off the deck of the carrier. Dead loads are large, wheeled, steel vessels weighing up to 80,000 pounds (36,000 kg) simulating the weight of actual aircraft.

On 11 August 2008, the Pre-Commissioning Unit (PCU) crew moved aboard the ship, the first meals were served in the galley, the U.S. flag was raised on the fantail for the first time, and the first watches were set. George H. W. Bush left Northrop Grumman Ship Building for the first time on 23 December 2008, proceeding a few miles down river to Norfolk Naval Station.

=== Commissioning ===
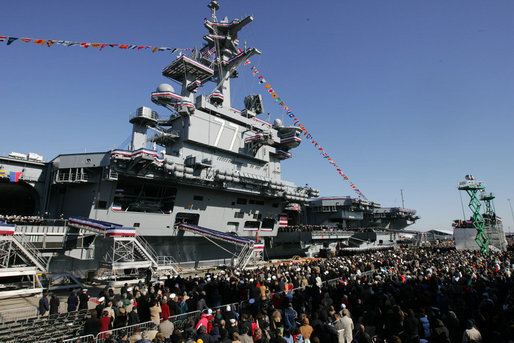
Guests and U.S. Navy personnel at the commissioning ceremony on 10 January 2009

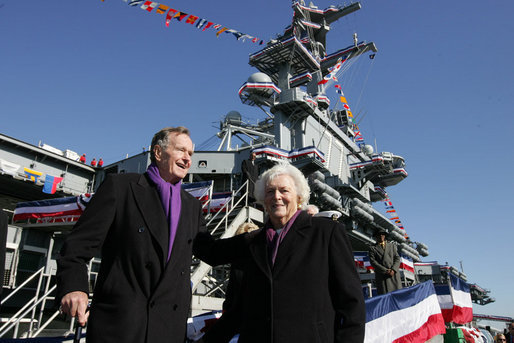
George H. W. and Barbara Bush depart the ship following the commissioning ceremony

George H. W. Bush was commissioned 10 January 2009 at Norfolk Naval Station prior to her official delivery to the Navy, in a ceremony attended by approximately 15,000 people. Veterans of USS San Jacinto, the ship George H. W. Bush served on during World War II, were also present. President George W. Bush delivered the principal address, George H. W. Bush set the first watch, and ship's sponsor Dorothy "Doro" Bush Koch gave the order to "man our ship and bring her to life!" A GM-built Grumman TBM Avenger like the one then-Lieutenant junior grade George Bush flew in World War II performed a fly-over.

Northrop Grumman Corporation Builder's sea trials were completed on 16 February 2009, providing an opportunity to test systems, components and compartments at sea for the first time. The trials included high-speed runs and a demonstration of the carrier's other capabilities. Following builder's trials, the ship underwent acceptance trials on 10 April 2009, conducted by representatives of the U.S. Navy Board of Inspection and Survey, to test and evaluate the ship's systems and performance.

=== Delivery and shakedown ===
George H. W. Bush was officially delivered to the Navy on 11 May 2009.

The first fixed-wing flights were conducted on 19 May 2009 when F/A-18 Super Hornets from Air Test and Evaluation Squadron at Naval Air Station Patuxent River, Maryland began flight deck certification, which tests a carrier's ability to conduct air operations.

On 26 May 2009, former president George H. W. Bush and his daughter, Dorothy Bush Koch, flew aboard the carrier to observe flight operations during the ship's underway period in the Atlantic Ocean. USS George H. W. Bush successfully completed her first flight deck certification on that day.

George H. W. Bush returned to Northrop Grumman Newport News shipyard on 18 June 2009 for post-delivery maintenance work, also known as the ship's post shakedown availability (PSA). A PSA is a typical availability in the early life of a carrier that allows the Navy and builder to resolve any items that came up during trials and delivery and make any last-minute changes and upgrades. Work includes the installation of a Rigid Hull Inflatable Boat (RHIB) handling system and a new fresh water purification system. Other changes include compartment reconfigurations, combat system and radar equipment upgrades, and minor repairs. The work was scheduled to last through early 2010.

=== Maiden 2011 deployment ===
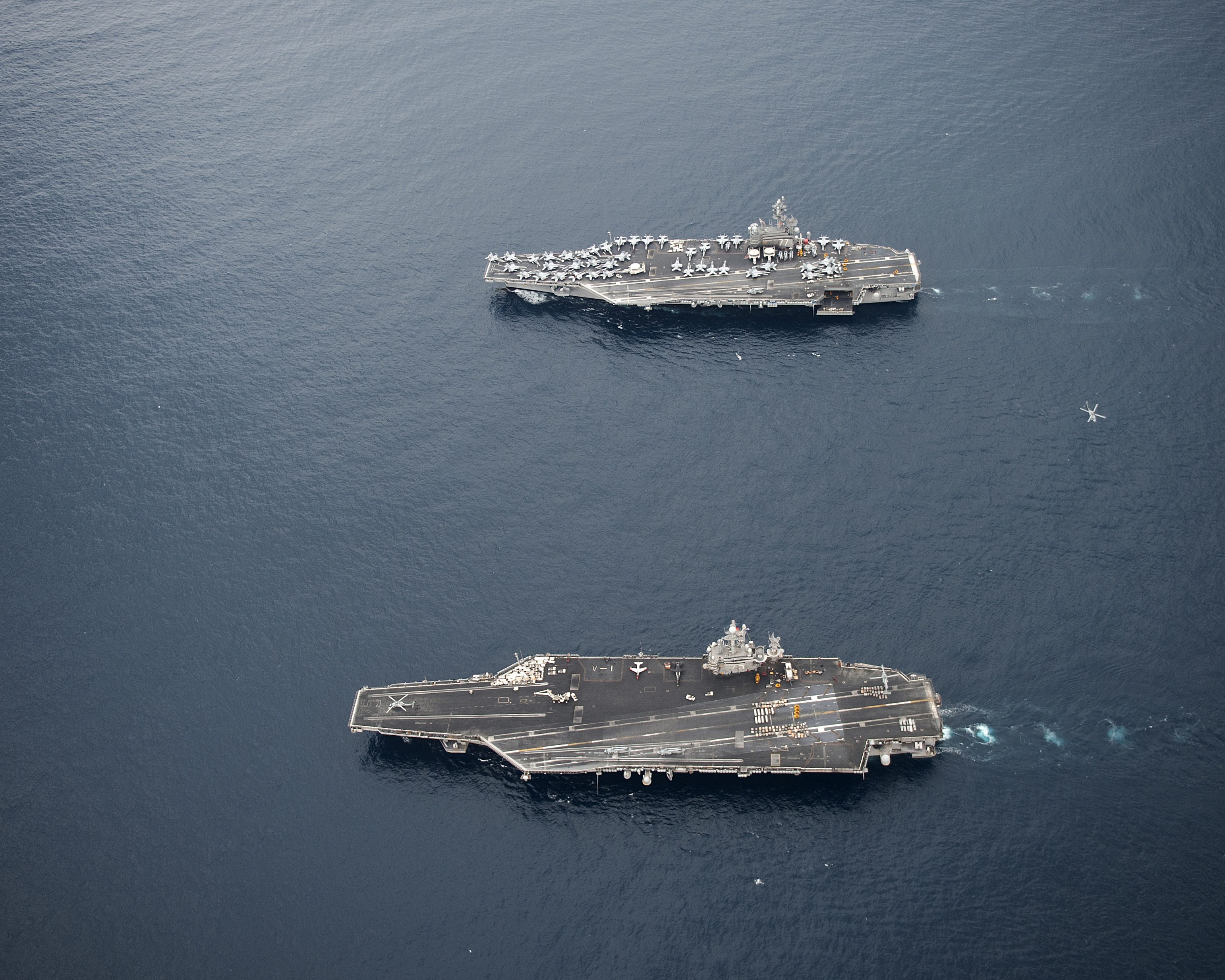
George H. W. Bush (top) conducts an ordnance transfer with Harry S Truman off the East Coast in 2011

The ship was assigned to Carrier Strike Group Two for her first deployment. Under the command of Rear Admiral Nora Tyson, George H. W. Bush, Carrier Air Wing Eight and the four ships of her group departed on her first deployment on 11 May 2011. They sailed across the Atlantic to Britain to participate in Exercise Saxon Warrior, held in the Western Approaches and culminating in a so-called 'Thursday War'. She then moved towards Portsmouth, United Kingdom, on 27 May, anchoring adjacent to Stokes Bay through 31 May, because she was too large to enter the harbor, and the naval base did not have sufficient nuclear berths for the carrier to moor alongside. The carrier arrived at Naples, Italy on 10 June 2011.

The carrier returned to Norfolk on 10 December 2011, following a seven-month deployment supporting operations with the U.S. Navy's 5th and 6th fleets.

=== 2012 ===
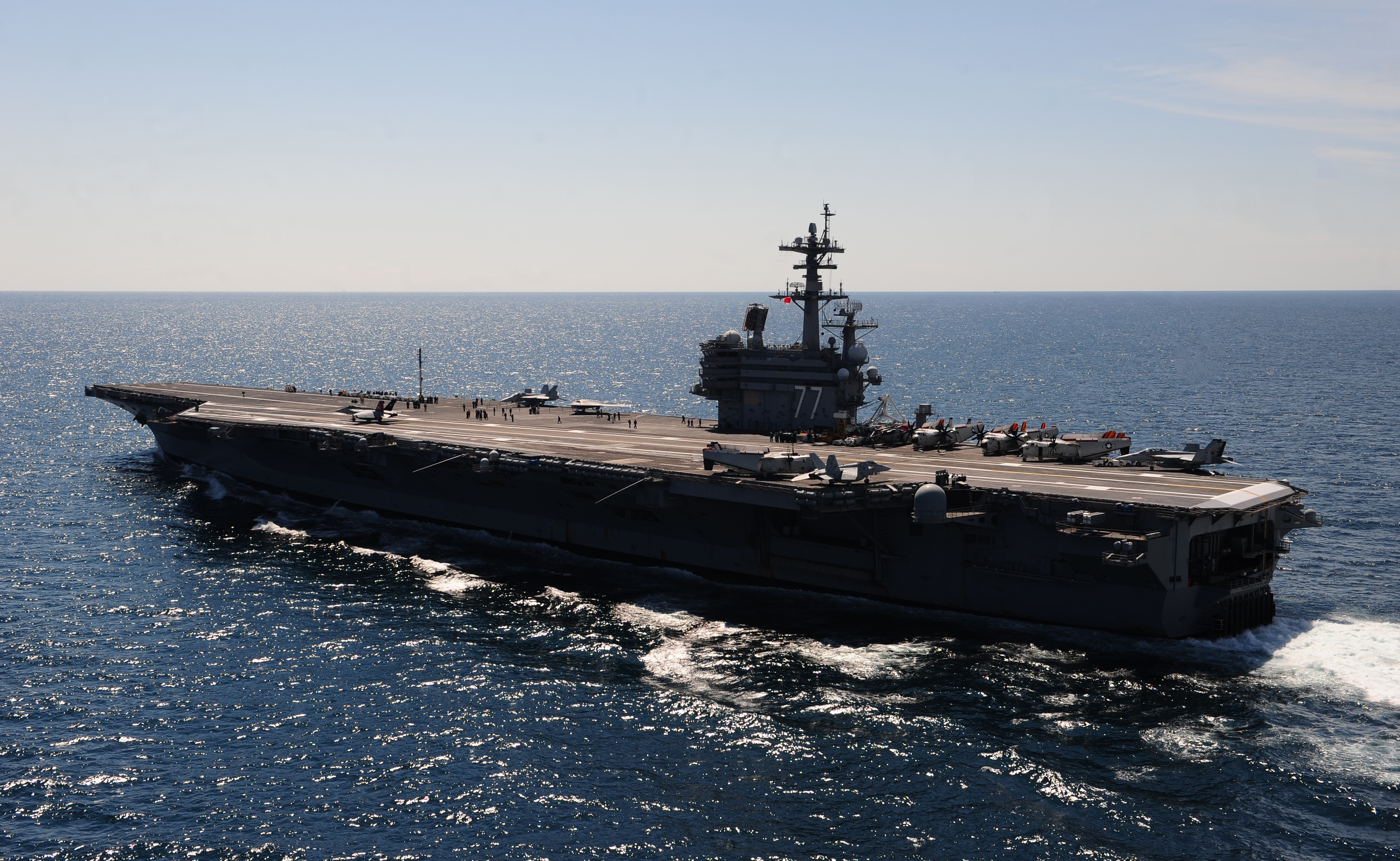
George H. W. Bush undertakes carrier qualifications in the Atlantic in May 2013; an F/A-18F Super Hornet is on the catapult; another F/A-18F and an X-47B are parked forward of the island superstructure; two more F/A-18Fs and four C-2 Greyhounds are parked aft.

On 25 July 2012, George H. W. Bush began her four-month overhaul at Norfolk Naval Shipyard at Portsmouth, Virginia, included scheduled short-term technical upgrades. On 1 December 2012, George H. W. Bush completed her PIA maintenance cycle and began sea trials on 3 December 2012. After completing sea trials on 4 December 2012, the carrier started her training and qualification cycle in preparation for the group's 2013 deployment.

=== 2013 ===
During a two-week underway period beginning 14 January 2013, George H. W. Bush tested the MV-22 tilt-rotor aircraft from squadron VMX-22 as a potential carrier onboard delivery aircraft as well as operating mine-sweeping MH-53E helicopters from squadron HM-14.

An X-47B is catapulted from George H. W. Bush in May 2013, the first time a UCAV had been launched from an aircraft carrier at sea, during carrier qualifications in the Atlantic

During another underway period, George H. W. Bush conducted at-sea tests for X-47B unmanned drone in the Atlantic Ocean, including the first time that an unmanned drone has been catapulted off an aircraft carrier on the morning of 14 May 2013 (pictured). On 17 May 2013, another first was achieved when the X-47B performed touch-and-go landings and take-offs on the flight deck of Bush while underway in the Atlantic Ocean. Also during this two-week underway period, the aircraft carrier tested a new torpedo self-defense system, as well as completed more than 115 launches and landings in assessing a new precision landing system, before returning to Norfolk on 24 May 2013.

On 10 July 2013, an unmanned X-47B drone completed an arrested landing on the flight deck of George H. W. Bush. The landing marks the first time any unmanned aircraft had completed an arrested landing on board an aircraft carrier operating at sea. The drone completed a second successful arrested landing on George H. W. Bush, but it was diverted to the Wallops Flight Facility in Virginia after an issue was detected, requiring that a planned third landing to be aborted. One of the drone's three navigational sub-systems failed, which was identified by the other two sub-systems. The anomaly was indicated to the mission operator, who followed test plan procedures to abort the landing. The Navy stated that the aircraft's detection of a problem demonstrated its reliability and ability to operate autonomously. On 15 July 2013, in a fourth attempt, an X-47B drone failed to make a successful flight deck landing on board the vessel due to "technical issues."

=== 2014 deployment ===
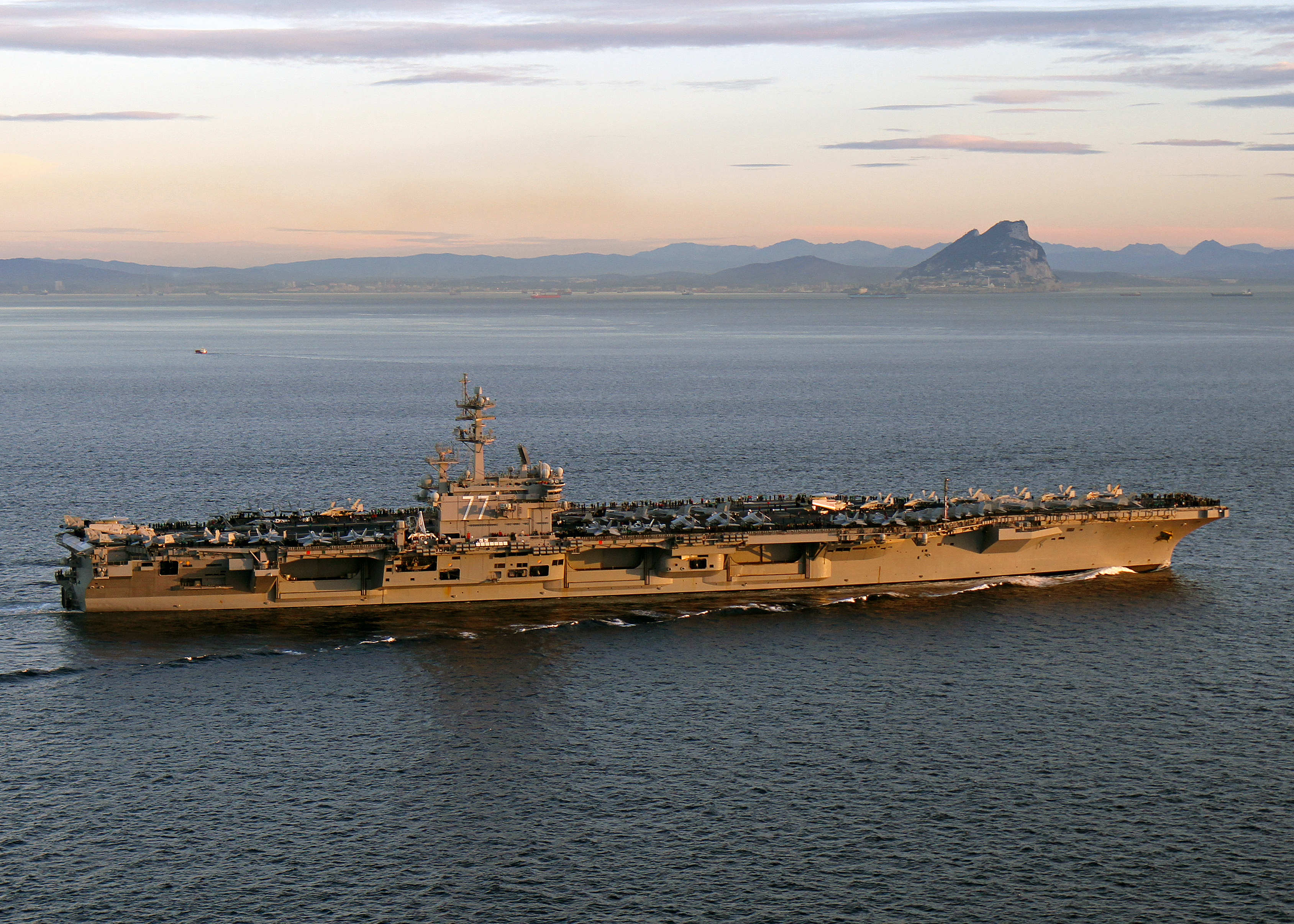
George H.W. Bush transits the Straits of Gibraltar in February 2014

In late February 2014, George H. W. Bush transited the Strait of Gibraltar on the way to a stop in Piraeus, Greece, for a scheduled port visit.

On 5 March 2014, George H. W. Bush arrived off southern Turkey, which is under 500 miles away from Crimea, amid developing tensions over Ukraine with Russia. On 9 March 2014, the carrier entered port in Antalya, in southern Turkey. Some news sources had speculated that the ship's stay in the Mediterranean Sea would be extended as a result of the annexation of Crimea, but this proved to not be the case with Carrier Strike Group 2 proceeding through the Suez Canal.

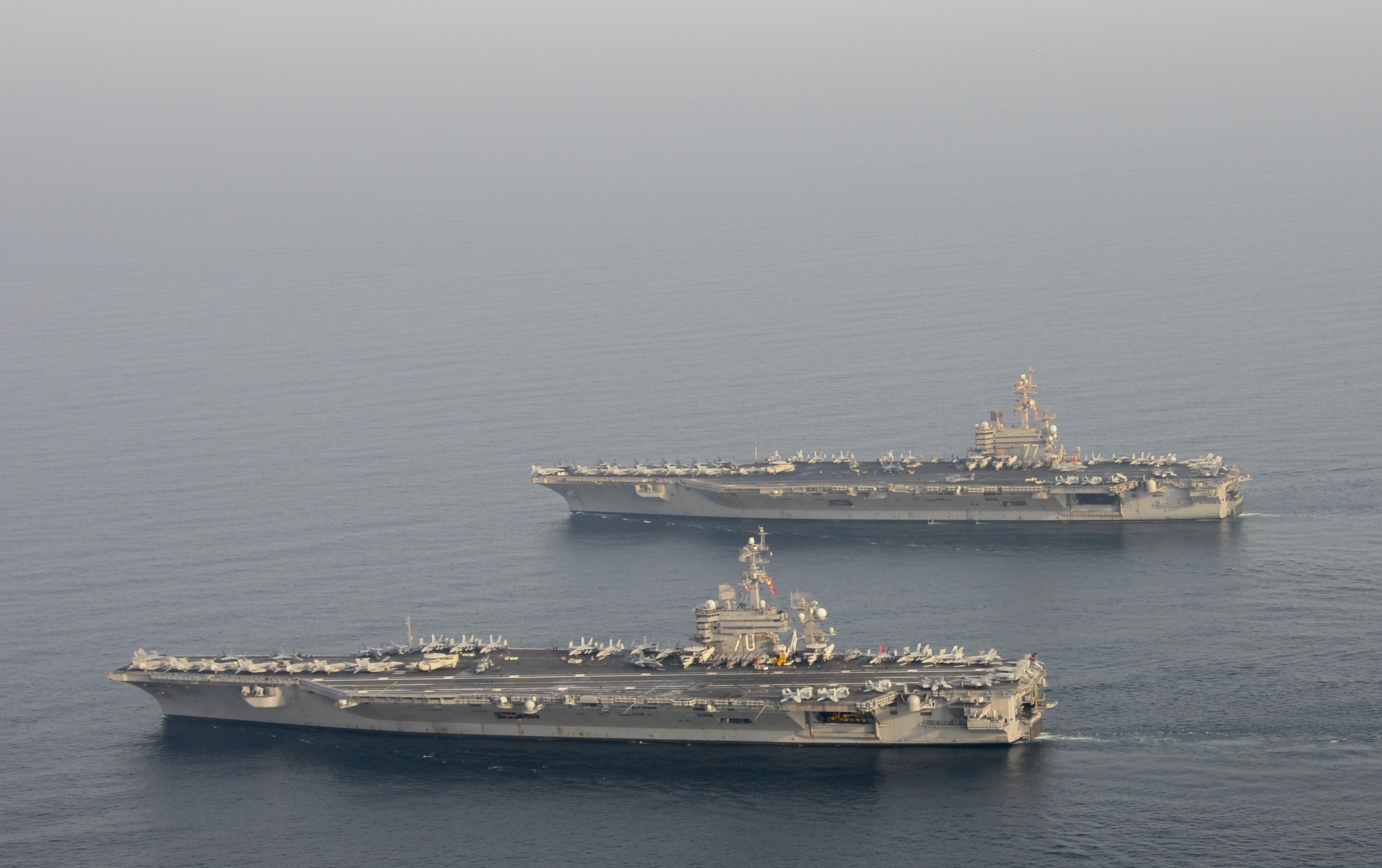
Carl Vinson (foreground) relieves George H. W. Bush as the 5th Fleet on station carrier in October 2014.

The carrier was transiting the Suez Canal on 18 March 2014. On 23 March USS Harry S. Truman officially turned over the watch to George H. W. Bush in the U.S. 5th Fleet area of responsibility conducting maritime security operations and supporting theater security cooperation efforts.

On 14 June 2014, George H. W. Bush was ordered to the Persian Gulf to protect US interests in Iraq in light of the militant group Islamic State of Iraq and the Levant's (ISIL) offensive and takeover of several major cities in that country.

On 8 August 2014, two F/A-18F Super Hornets launched from the ship and dropped 500-pound (230 kg) laser-guided bombs on an ISIL mobile artillery cannon shelling Kurdish forces outside their capital city, Erbil. The mission was launched in accordance with President Obama's announcement on the evening of 7 August that the US would begin airstrikes to protect US personnel and the Yazidis in the region from ISIL attacks.

On 23 September 2014 F/A-18 Hornets and Super Hornets from Carrier Air Wing Eight launched from George H. W. Bush in the Persian Gulf to strike at specific targets in Syria such as command-and-control centers, training camps, and weapons depots.

On 15 November 2014, George H. W. Bush returned to her homeport in Norfolk, Virginia after a nine-month deployment.

=== 2017 deployment ===
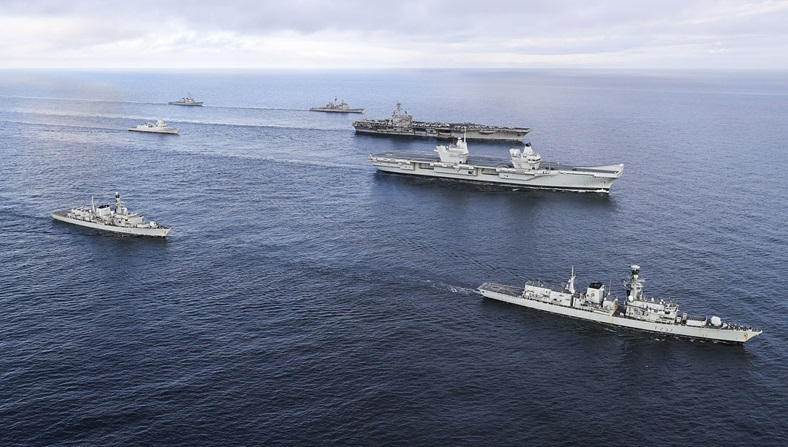
George H. W. Bush in company with HMS Queen Elizabeth and escorts

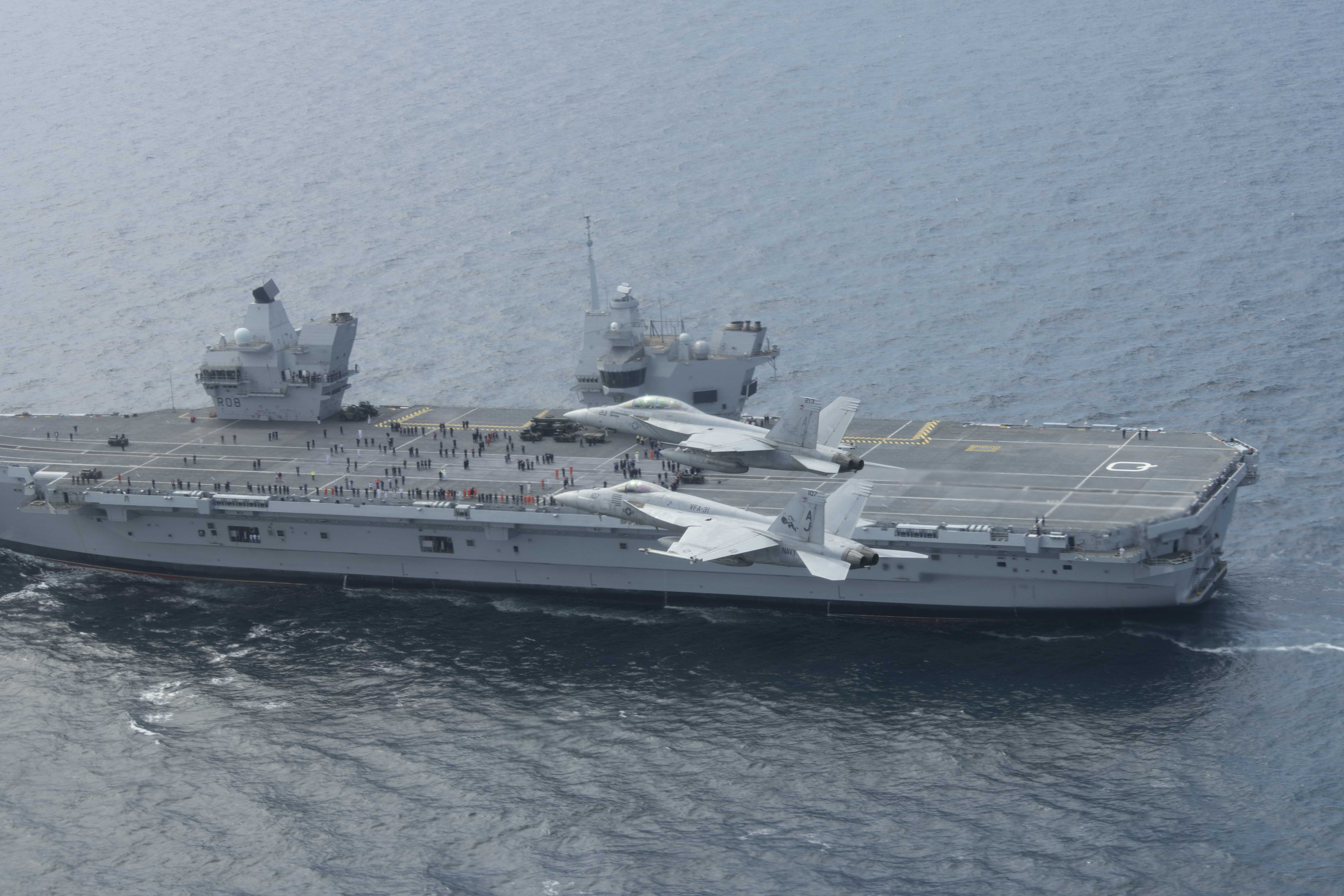
A pair of Super Hornets from USS George H. W. Bush overfly HMS Queen Elizabeth during Exercise Saxon Warrior in 2017

Following a 14-month shipyard availability at Norfolk Naval Shipyard and a compressed training cycle, George H. W. Bush and Carrier Air Wing Eight departed Norfolk on 21 January for her third deployment. She transited the Strait of Gibraltar on 2 February and after a port visit to Souda Bay, Crete, she again participated in strikes against ISIL in support of Operation Inherent Resolve.

In July 2017, George H. W. Bush arrived in the UK to take part in Exercise Saxon Warrior, a joint exercise involving Carrier Strike Group 2 plus elements of the Royal Navy, German Navy, Royal Norwegian Navy and Swedish Navy. This included the staff of the Royal Navy's Carrier Strike Group embarking Bush as part of their preparation for the entry into service of HMS Queen Elizabeth, the first of Britain's new aircraft carriers.

=== 2018 ===
In May 2018, George H. W. Bush took part in the Franco-American exercise Chesapeake Mission, with twelve Dassault Aviation Rafale M and a Grumman E-2C Hawkeye from the French Navy embarked on board.

=== 2019 ===
In February 2019, George H. W. Bush arrived at Norfolk Naval Shipyard for a planned 28-month docking planned incremental availability (DPIA). This was the ship's first DPIA.

The United States Navy announced on 24 September that there had been three suicides among the crew serving aboard George H. W. Bush in one week. Two previous ship suicides had taken place in November 2017 and July 2019.

=== 2020 ===
On 30 July 2020, Navy Times reported that a spokesperson for Naval Air Force Atlantic confirmed that a "small number" of sailors assigned to George H. W. Bush had tested positive for COVID-19 during the summer. The spokesperson declined to provide an exact number of sailors or a more precise date regarding when the virus was detected, citing US Defense Department policy, but added that the carrier was not deployed at the time, and that those infected "remain[ed] in isolation at their private residences in Virginia and receive[d] daily medical supportive care".

In August 2020, George H. W. Bush left dry dock at Norfolk Naval Shipyard, after 18 months of the planned two-year overhaul. It was the vessel's most extensive maintenance period and marked the first time out of water since she was built. The overhaul was the most complex undertaken at the shipyard to date, according to the Navy.

=== 2022–2023 deployment ===
On 10 August 2022, George H. W. Bush, with Carrier Air Wing 7 (CVW-7) embarked, began a deployment as part of Carrier Strike Group 10 (CSG-10). This marks the carrier's first deployment since her 2017 deployment, after which she underwent major maintenance. CSG-10 was reportedly set to relieve Carrier Strike Group 8 (CSG-8) and its flagship, USS Harry S. Truman, in the Mediterranean Sea. On 25 August 2022, George H. W. Bush and CSG-10 transited the Strait of Gibraltar and entered the Mediterranean Sea. George H. W. Bush returned to Norfolk on 23 April 2023.

=== 2025 ===
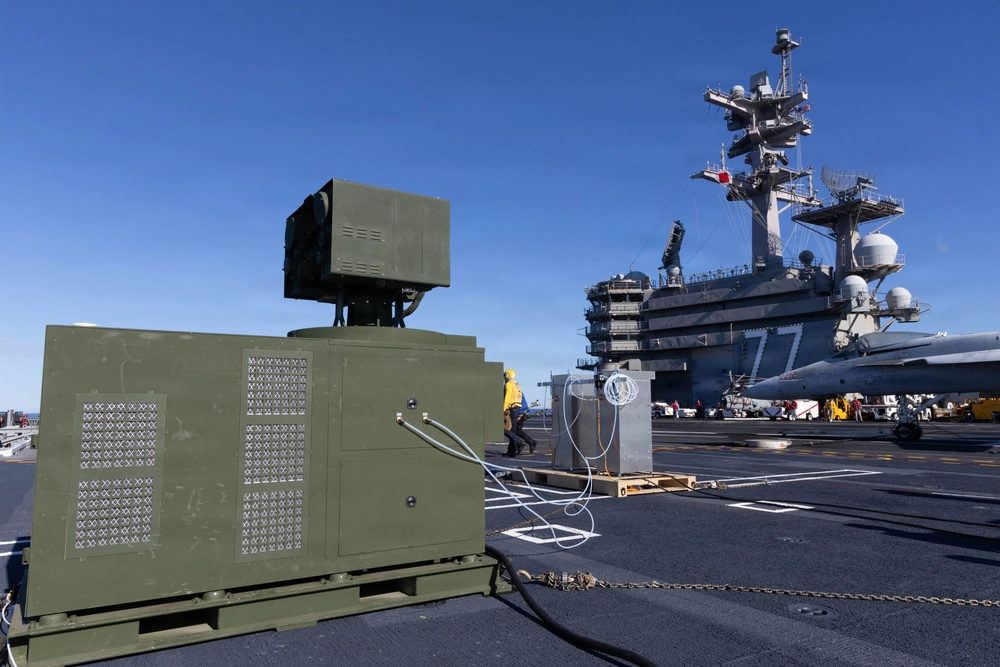
LOCUST high-energy laser system onboard the USS George H. W. Bush

During 2025, the George H. W. Bush had tested the Locust Laser Weapon System (LWS) onboard as part of a live-fire test. During the live-fire, the LWS had successfully managed to detect, engaged, and destroyed multiple unmanned aerial vehicles.

=== 2026 ===
According to reports in January, after tensions between Iran and the US over Iran's nuclear program began to grew in January 2026 amid Iran's massacres of Iranian civilians during their crackdown of the 2025–2026 anti-government protests, the George H. W. Bush was expected to be deployed as part of the US military buildup in the Middle East, but the Abraham Lincoln and Gerald R. Ford carriers were sent instead. On March 7th, during the second week of the 2026 Iran war, Fox News reported that the US also expected to deploy the George H. W. Bush to the Middle East. On March 31st, during the fifth week of the 2026 Iran war, the George H. W. Bush was deployed to the Middle East.

On April 23, 2026, the George H. W. Bush and her carrier strike group had successfully sailed in the Indian Ocean entering the CENTCOM area of responsibility, following the transit through Cape Agulhas then Mozambique Channel. The arrival of the George H. W. Bush brings the number of aircraft carriers deployed in the region to 3 carriers. With the George H. W. Bush in the region, this is the first time in decades where there are three aircraft carriers operating the Middle East since 2003.
