= Carrier Strike Group 12 =

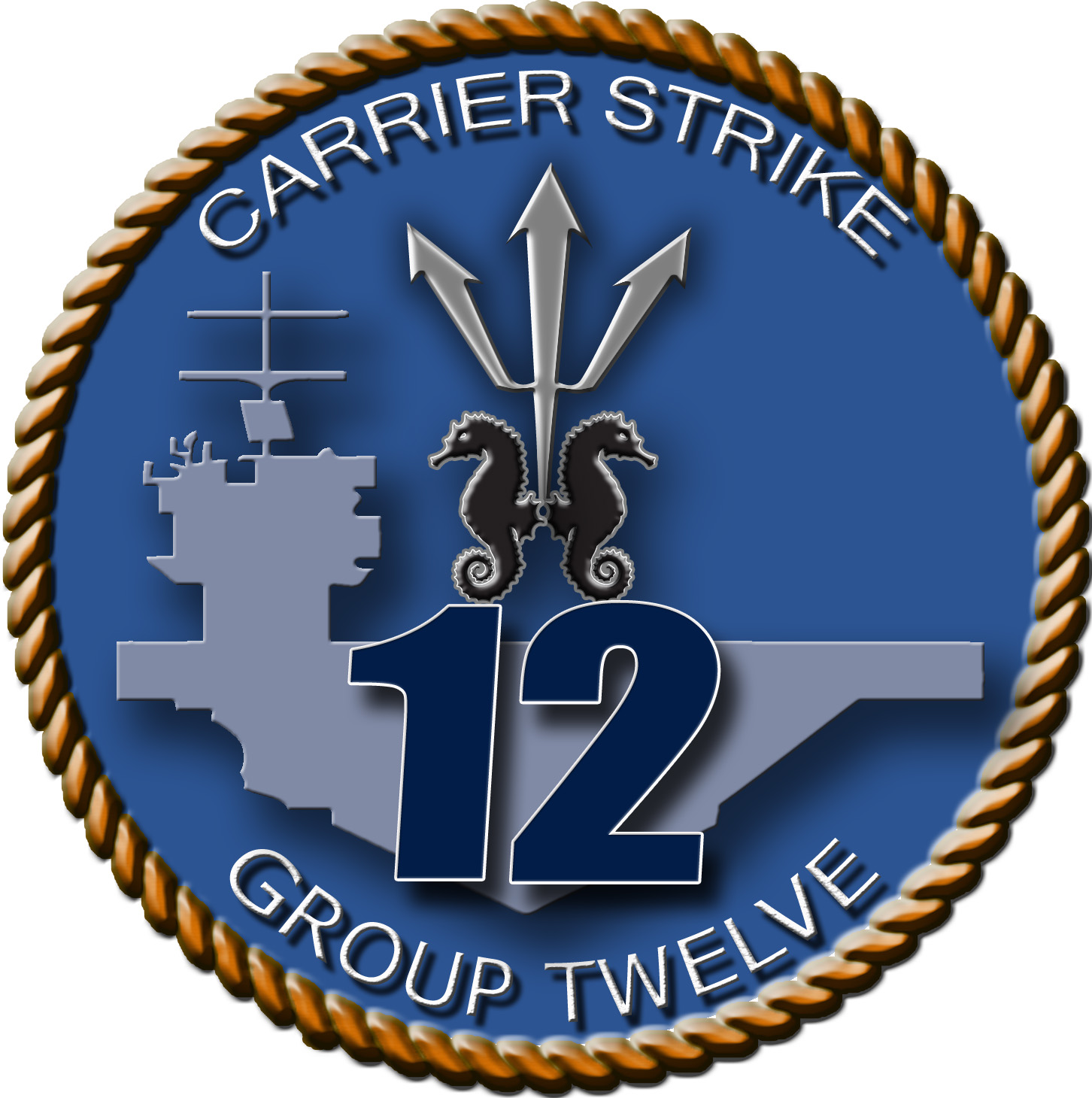
- Carrier Strike Group Twelve emblem
- Founded: 1 October 2004; 22 years ago
- Country: United States
- Branch: United States Navy
- Type: Carrier Strike Group
- Role: Naval air/surface warfare
- Part of: United States Fleet Forces Command
- Garrison/HQ: Naval Station Norfolk, Virginia, U.S.
- Nickname: USS Gerald R. Ford (CVN-78) Carrier Strike Group
- Engagements: Operation Iraqi Freedom; War in Afghanistan; Operation Medusa; Operation Mountain Fury; Operation New Dawn; Operation Inherent Resolve

Commanders
- Commander: Rear Admiral Gavin Duff, USN
- Command Master Chief: CMDCM(SW) Steven Garrow, USN

Aircraft flown
- Electronic warfare: EA-18G Growler
- Fighter: F/A-18E/F Super Hornet
- Helicopter: MH-60R Seahawk; MH-60S Seahawk
- Reconnaissance: E-2D Hawkeye
- Transport: CMV-22B Osprey

Carrier Strike Group Twelve (CSG-12 or CARSTRKGRU 12) is one of four U.S. Navy carrier strike groups currently assigned to the United States Fleet Forces Command. USS Gerald R. Ford is the aircraft carrier assigned as the strike group's flagship. Units currently assigned to Carrier Strike Group Twelve include Carrier Air Wing Eight, the Arleigh Burke-class USS Winston S. Churchill (DDG-81) and Destroyer Squadron 2.

Between 2006 and 2011, with USS Enterprise as its flagship, the group made four deployments to the U.S. Fifth Fleet in the Middle East. Strike group aircraft flew over 13,000 air combat missions in support of coalition ground forces in Iraq and Afghanistan, including 2006's Operation Medusa and Operation Mountain Fury in Afghanistan. The group's surface warships were also involved in several high-profile anti-piracy operations. The group participated in the multilateral exercises Anatolian Sun 2006, Reliant Mermaid 2007, BALTOPS 2008, and Malabar 2015; the bilateral exercise Inspired Union 2006; and the joint exercise Exercise Bold Alligator 2012.

The 2015 deployment was led by its new flagship, USS Theodore Roosevelt, which has since left the group and shifted homeport to Naval Base San Diego, California. Carrier Strike Group Twelve was the first U.S. Navy carrier strike group to deploy with a Naval Integrated Fire Control-Counter Air (NIFC-CA) capability that integrates all units via a data link to gain a more comprehensive overview of its operational battlespace. To augment this NIFC-CA capability, the strike group embarked the new E-2D airborne early warning (AEW) aircraft, making its first overseas deployment.

== Predecessor history 1966–2004 ==
After 8 December 1966, USS Columbus (flag) and USS Belknap of Cruiser-Destroyer Flotilla 8 were involved in the response to the sinking of SS Heraklion off Greece. Commanding CRUDESFLOT 8 at the time was Rear Admiral John D. Bulkeley.

On 30 June 1973, Commander Cruiser Destroyer Flotilla 8 was re-designated as Commander Cruiser-Destroyer Group 8 (CCDG-8). Commander, Cruiser-Destroyer Group 8 subsequently served as the Immediate Superior-in-Command (ISIC) for the Saratoga, Dwight D. Eisenhower, and Theodore Roosevelt carrier battle groups. The group took part in Operation Southern Watch and Operation Deny Flight.

In 1986, while commanding Cruiser-Destroyer Group 8, Rear Admiral David E. Jeremiah commanded the Saratoga group and Task Group 60.2 of the U.S. Sixth Fleet during a series of operations code-named Attain Document. They were intended to assert freedom of navigation in the Gulf of Sidra as well as to challenge Libya's maritime territorial claims. The Saratoga battle group and the rest of Task Force 60 later carried out Operation El Dorado Canyon, a series of punitive air strikes against Libya in retaliations to the 1986 Berlin discotheque bombing. During both operations, Admiral Jeremiah commanded Task Force 60, the three-carrier task force of the Sixth Fleet, code-named Battle Force Zulu.

In the middle of 1992, there was a Navy reorganization. Each of the Navy's 12 existing carrier battle groups was planned to consist of an aircraft carrier; an embarked carrier air wing; cruiser, destroyer, and frigate units; and two nuclear-powered attack submarines. The group's composition after the reorganization can be seen below.

Cruiser-Destroyer Group Eight, late 1992

Cruisers/Submarines	Destroyer Squadron 24		Carrier Air Wing 17 squadrons embarked aboard USS Saratoga (CV-60)	
USS Philippine Sea (CG-58)	USS Hayler (DD-997)	USS John L. Hall (FFG-32)	Fighter Squadron 103: F-14B	Airborne Early Warning Sqd. 125: E-2C
USS Thomas S. Gates (CG-51)	USS Moosbrugger (DD-980)	USS Stephen W. Groves (FFG-29)	Fighter Squadron 74: F-14B	Sea Control Squadron 30: S-3B
USS Biddle (CG-34)	USS Comte de Grasse (DD-974)	USS Gallery (FFG-26)	Strike Fighter Squadron 83: F/A-18C	Helicopter Anti-Submarine Sqd. 9: SH-3H
USS Dale (CG-19)	USS Arthur W. Radford (DD-968)	USS Jack Williams (FFG-24)	Strike Fighter Squadron 81: F/A-18C	——
USS City of Corpus Christi (SSN-705)	——	——	Attack Squadron 35: A-7E	——
USS Billfish (SSN-676)	——	——	Airborne Early Warning Sqd. 132: EA-6B	——

On 30 September 1992, when Saratoga accidentally fired two Sea Sparrow missiles at the Turkish destroyer minelayer TCG Muavenet, during Exercise 'Display Determination '92,' Commander Cruiser-Destroyer Group Eight was embarked.

During the early period of the 2003 invasion of Iraq, Commander Cruiser-Destroyer Group Eight was embarked aboard Theodore Roosevelt as a part of Task Force 60, striking Iraqi targets from the Mediterranean Sea.

On 1 September 2004, Rear Admiral James W. Stevenson Jr., Commander Cruiser-Destroyer Group Eight, took command of the Enterprise group. Admiral Stevenson had been in command of Cruiser-Destroyer Group Eight since May 2004. Formerly, the Enterprise Carrier Strike Group had been under the command of Commander Cruiser-Destroyer Group 12 based in Naval Station Mayport, Florida. On 1 October 2004, Cruiser-Destroyer Group 8 was re-designated as Carrier Strike Group Twelve.

== History 2004 onwards ==
On 3 September 2004, the group's flagship Enterprise entered the Newport News shipyard for an extended selected restricted availability overhaul. On 13 October 2005, the Enterprise pulled away from Norfolk Naval Station's Pier 12 for sea trials. Enterprise's post-overhaul sea trials ended on 15 October 2005.

=== 2006 deployment ===
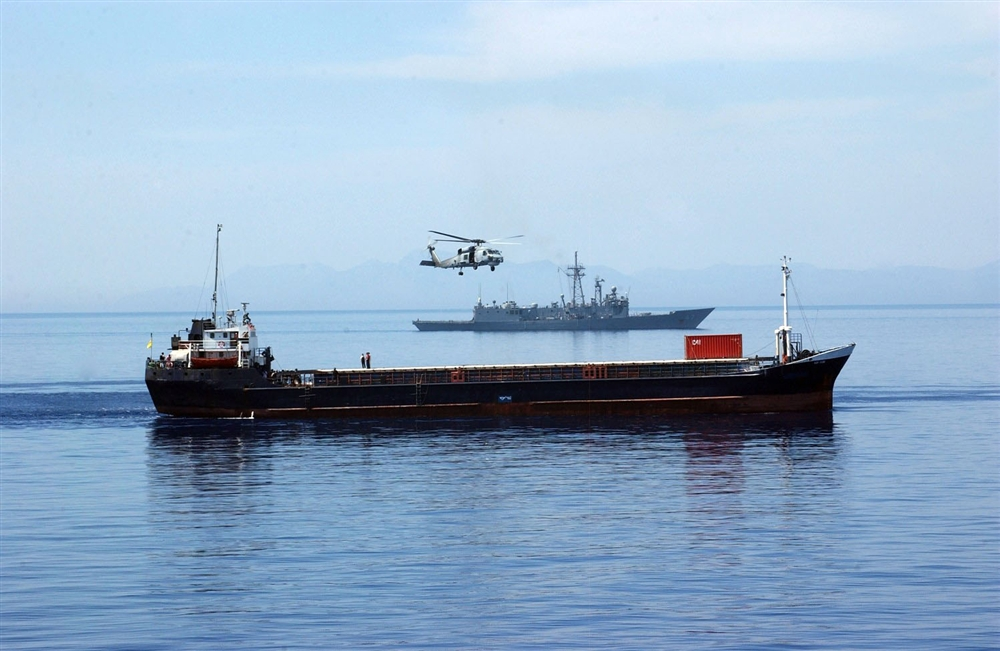
Anatolian Sun 2006

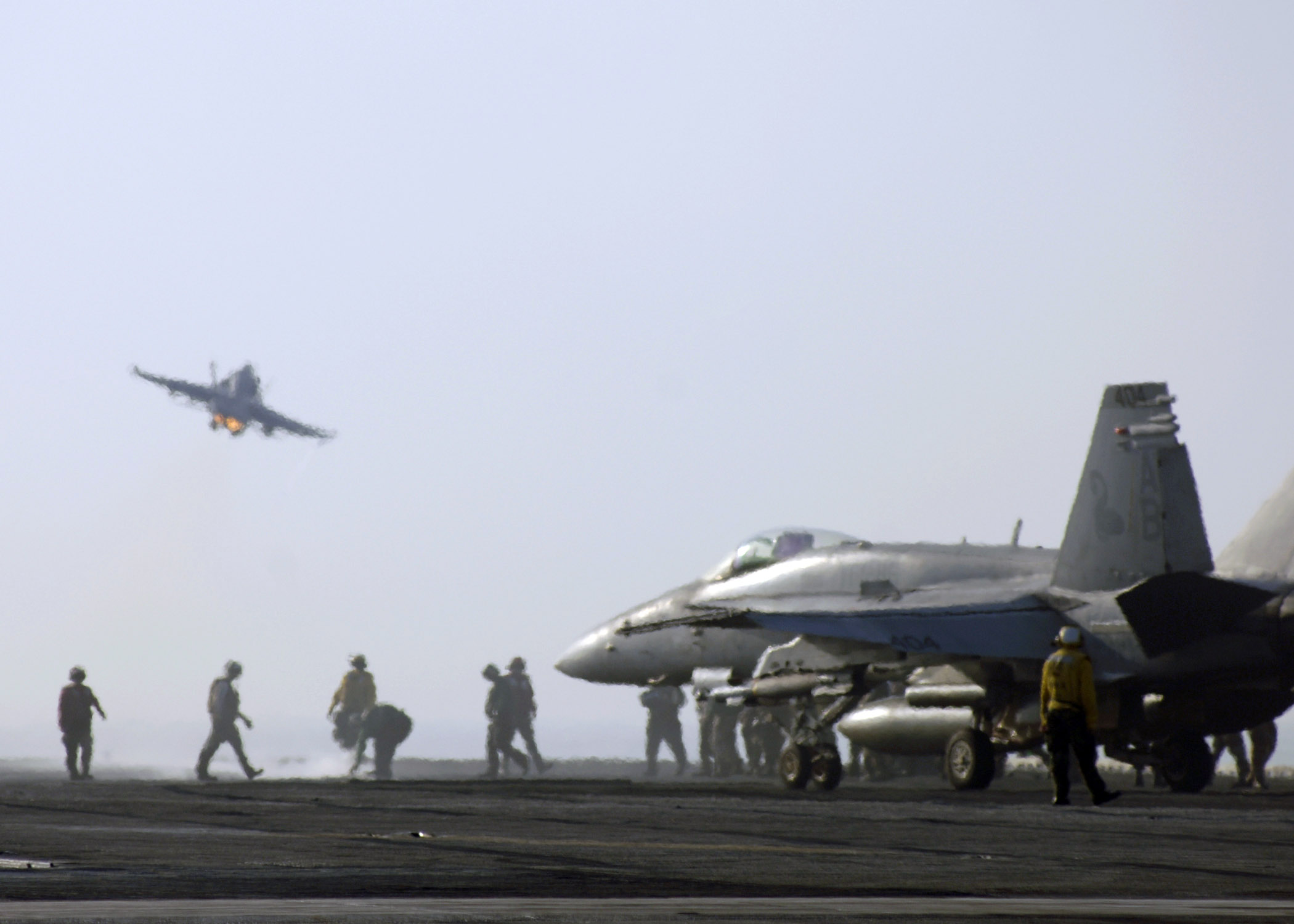
Operation Medusa (26 September 2006)

On 2 May 2006, the strike group departed Naval Station Norfolk, Virginia, for its 2006 deployment under the command of Rear Admiral Ray Spicer. The group trained with naval forces from Bulgaria, Germany, Croatia, and Greece during its transit through the Mediterranean. The frigate Nichols participated in Anatolian Sun, a Proliferation Security Initiative exercise, held between 24 and 26 May 2006 hosted for the first time by Turkey.

The group spent two periods with the U.S. Fifth Fleet during its 2006 deployment. During the deployment, Carrier Air Wing One delivered 65,000 pounds (29,483.50 kilograms) of ordnance, including 137 precision weapons, to provide air support of Operation Enduring Freedom – Afghanistan and Operation Iraqi Freedom. Its aircraft completed more than 8,300 sorties, of which 2,186 were combat missions while flying more than 22,500 hours and making 6,916-day and night arrested landings. Carrier Air Wing One provided the first combat air support to Operation Enduring Freedom from an aircraft carrier in more than three years.

The first Fifth Fleet rotation began when the strike group entered the Persian Gulf on 6 June 2006. During this initial rotation, Carrier Air Wing One flew 781 sorties in support of Coalition ground forces in Afghanistan for a total of 3,832 flight hours. The air wing also flew an additional 237 sorties in support of ground forces in Iraq for a total of 455 flight hours. Carrier Strike Group Twelve ended this first operational phase and departed the Persian Gulf on 6 July 2006. The strike group subsequently conducted a two-month deployment with the U.S. Seventh Fleet in the Western Pacific which included training exercises with Carrier Strike Group Five. This was the first time that an East Coast-based carrier air wing had operated in the western Pacific in 18 years, and the first time that the carrier Enterprise had operated in the Pacific since its transfer to the U.S. Atlantic Fleet.

On 28 August 2006, the group rejoined the Fifth Fleet and began its second rotation in the Persian Gulf on 8 September 2006. Beginning on 2 September 2006, the strike group provided combat air support (pictured) for two major ground operations, with coalition forces engaging Taliban insurgents in the Kandahar Province as part of Operation Medusa while Operation Mountain Fury targeted Taliban forces in the Paktika, Khost, Ghazni, Paktia, Logar provinces adjacent to the Pakistani border. All four strike fighter squadrons from Carrier Air Wing One flew more than 450 sorties and delivered over 100 precision weapons during this second rotation to the Persian Gulf which ended on 1 November 2006. Carrier Strike Group Twelve returned to Norfolk on 18 November 2006.

2006 deployment force composition

Warships	Carrier Air Wing One squadrons embarked aboard USS Enterprise (CVN-65)	
USS Leyte Gulf (CG-55)	Marine Fighter Attack Squadron 251 (VMFA-251): F/A-18C(N)	Carrier Airborne Early Warning Squadron 123 (VAW-123): E-2C NP
USS McFaul (DDG-74)	Strike Fighter Squadron 211 (VFA-211): F/A-18F	Sea Control Squadron 32 (VS-32): S-3B
USS Nicholas (FFG-47)	Strike Fighter Squadron 136 (VFA-136): F/A-18C	Helicopter Antisubmarine Squadron 11 (HS-11): SH-60F/HH-60H
USS Alexandria (SSN-757)	Strike Fighter Squadron 86 (VFA-86): F/A-18C(N)	Fleet Logistics Support Squadron 40 (VRC-40), Det. 4: C-2A
USNS Supply (T-AOE-6)	Electronic Attack Squadron 137 (VAQ-137): EA-6B	——

2006 deployment combat operations, exercises, and port visits

Number	Regional Exercises				Port Visits		Notes
Number	Duration	U.S. Force	Bilateral/Multilateral Partner(s)	Operating Area	Location	Dates	Notes
1st:	——	Carrier Strike Group 12	——	——	Split, Croatia	17–21 May 2006	
2nd:	various	Carrier Strike Group 12	Theater Security: Bulgaria, Germany, Croatia, and Greece	Mediterranean Sea	Souda Bay, Crete	23 May 2006	
3rd:	24–26 May 2006	Nichols	Anatolian Sun 06: France, Portugal, Turkey	Mediterranean Sea	Anatalya, Turkey	25 May 2006	
5th:	6 Jun to 6 July 2006	Carrier Strike Group 12	Operation Enduring Freedom: ISAF (Note: Over 1011 combat sorties were flown by Carrier Air Wing One from 19 March to 9 April 2011.)	Persian Gulf	——	——	
5th:	16 July 2006	Carrier Strike Group 12	Carrier Strike Group 5	Philippine Sea	Pusan, Korea	18 July 2006	
6th:	——	Carrier Strike Group 12	——	——	Hong Kong	27–30 Sep 2006	
7th:	——	Carrier Strike Group 12	——	——	Kuala Lumpur, Malaysia	1 August 2006	
8th:	——	Carrier Strike Group 12	——	——	Singapore	3–6 Aug 2006	
9th:	3–21 Sep 2006	Carrier Strike Group 12	Inspired Union 06: Pakistan Navy	Northern Arabian Sea	Kuala Lumpur, Malaysia	15–19 Aug 2006	
10th:	2 Sep to 1 November 2006	Carrier Strike Group 12	Operation Enduring Freedom: ISAF (Note: Includes Operation Medusa and Operation Mountain Fury.)	Persian Gulf	Jebel Ali, United Arab Emirates	18–23 Oct 2006	

=== 2007 deployment ===
On 7 July 2007, the group departed Naval Station Norfolk, Virginia, for its 2007 deployment under the command of Rear Admiral Daniel P. Holloway. The group entered the U.S. Sixth Fleet area of responsibility on 16 July 2007. Seven days later, on 23 July 2007, two French Rafale M jet fighters landed on board the Enterprise and were subsequently launched, a first for an American aircraft carrier. The group then visited Cannes, France.

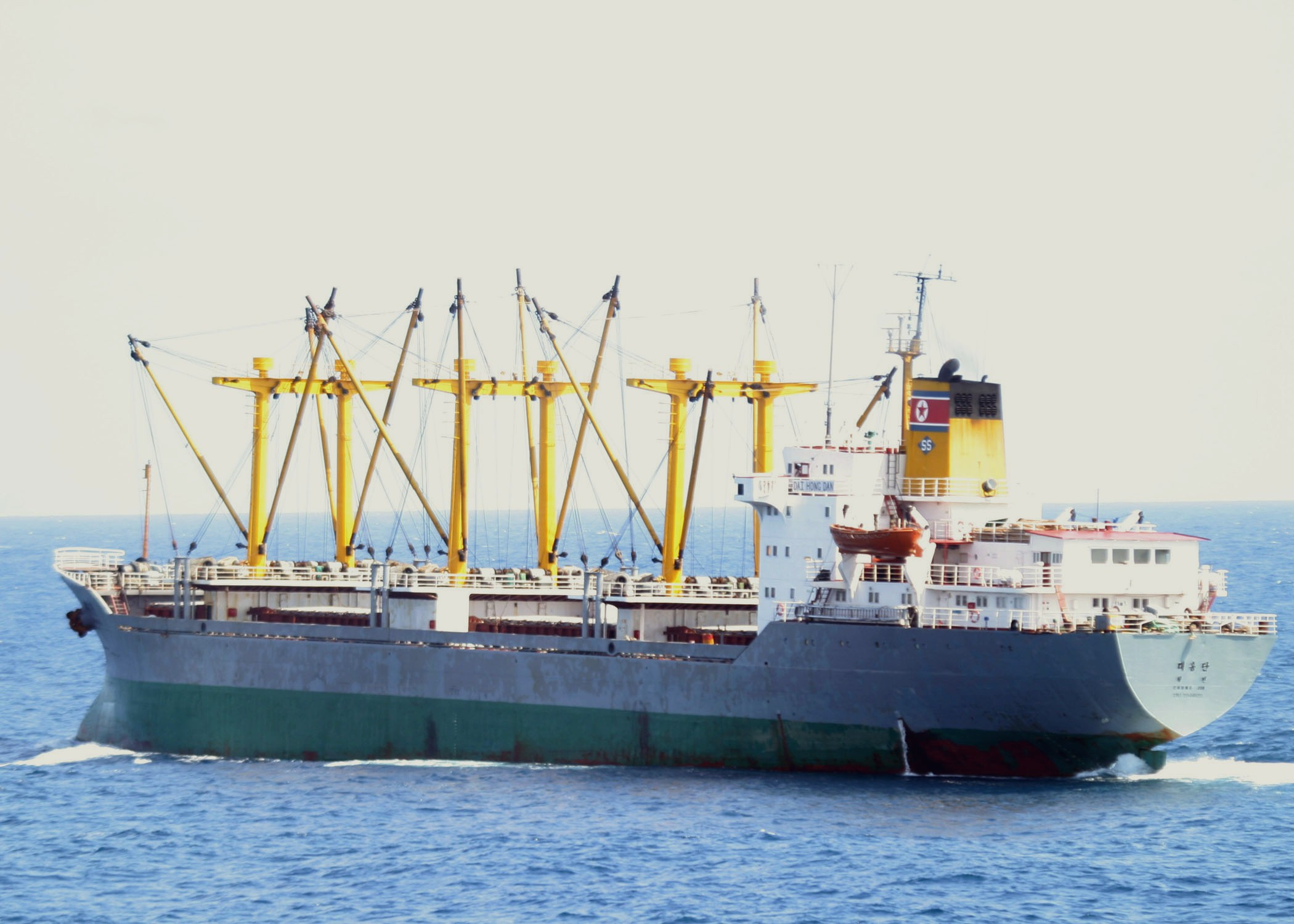
Dai Hong Dan (30 October 2007)

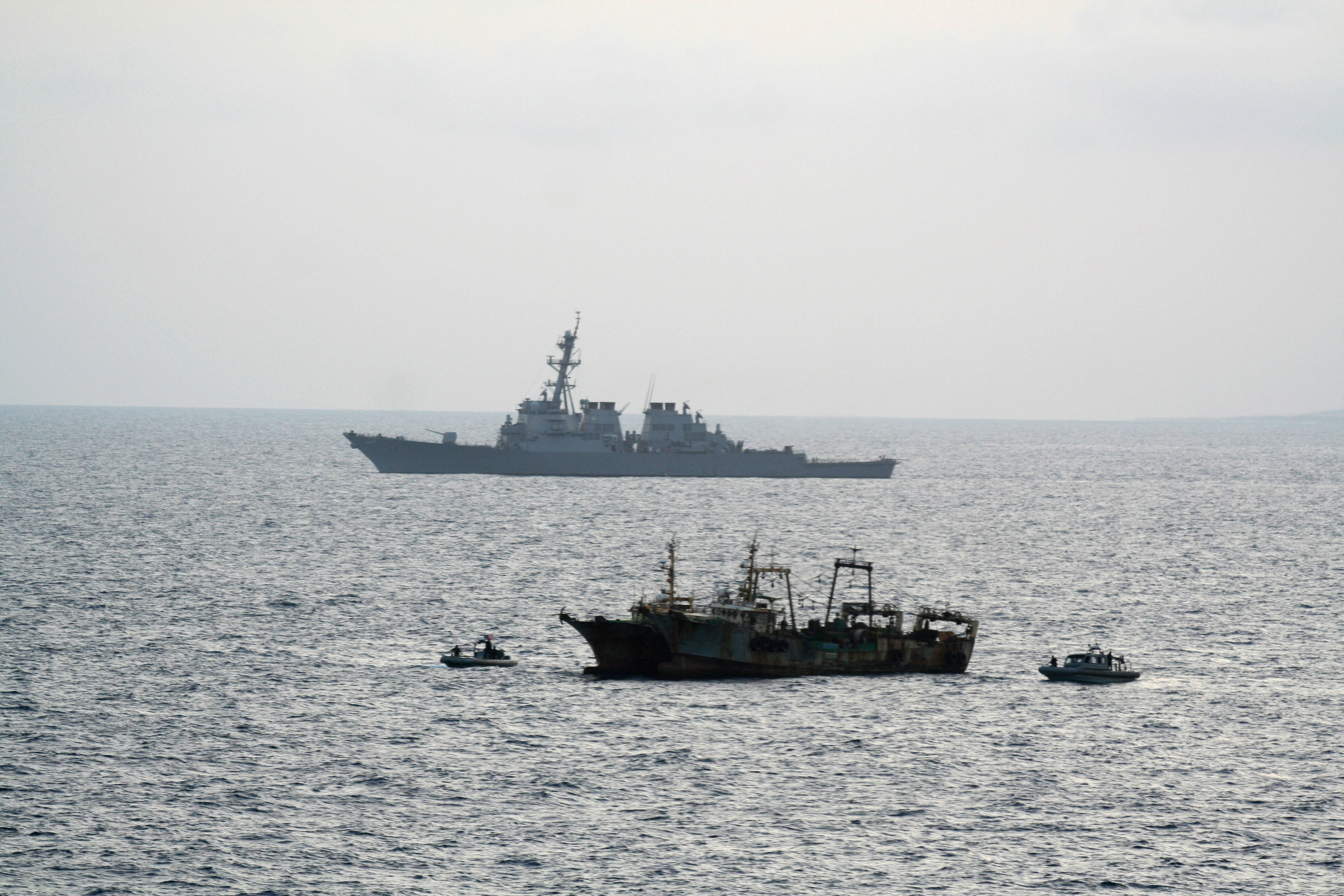
Ching Fong Hwa (5 November 2007)

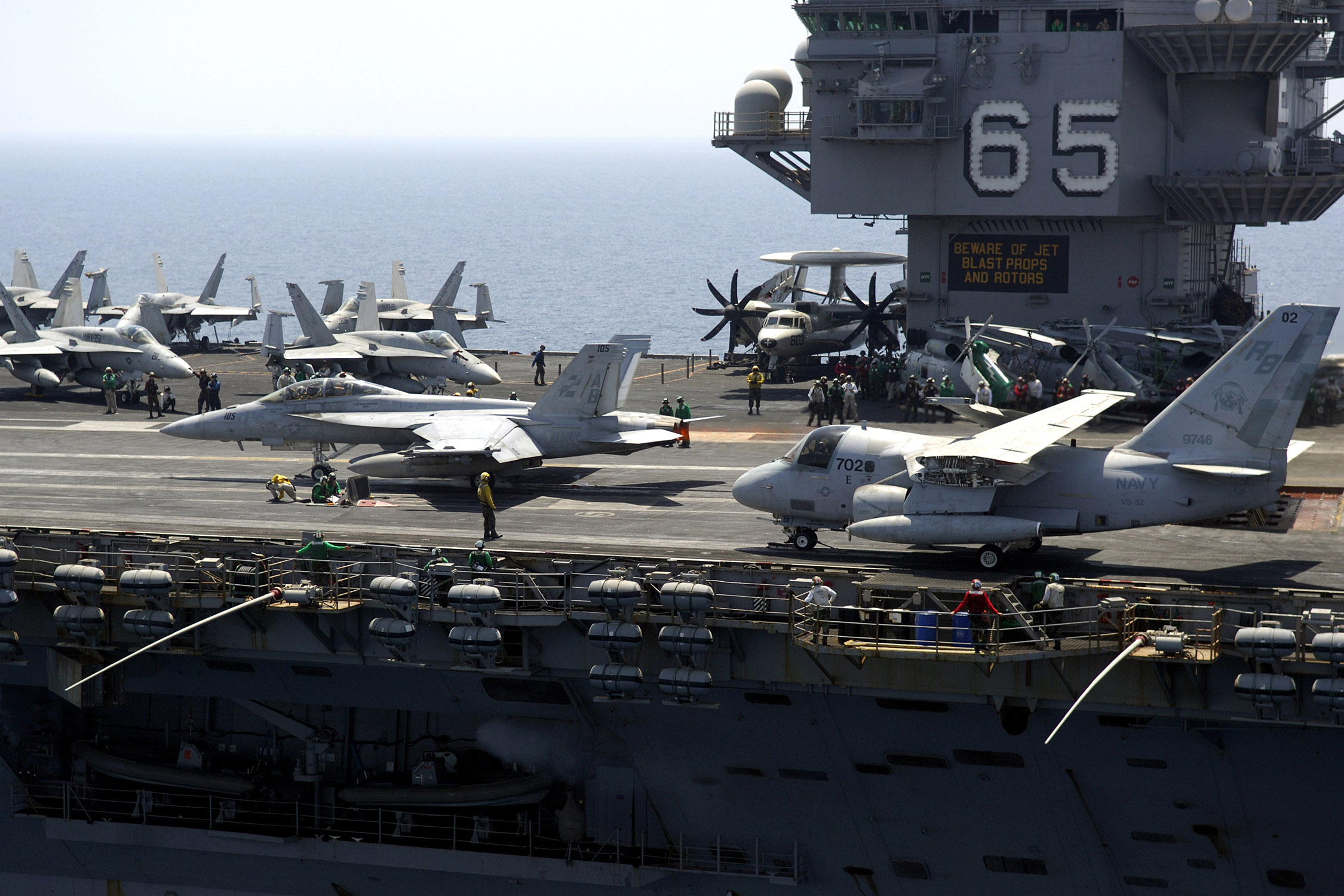
S-3B Viking from VS-32 (17 August 2007)

The group entered the U.S. Fifth Fleet area on 1 August 2007 and began air operations over the Persian Gulf on 12 August 2007. During its 2007 deployment to the U.S. Fifth Fleet, aircraft from Carrier Air Wing One flew more than 7,500 missions, which included 1,676 combat missions, and made more than 6,500 arrested landings for a total of 20,300 hours. Aircraft dropped 73 air-to-ground weapons and fired 4,149 rounds of 20-mm ammunition in support of ground forces in Iraq and Afghanistan. Strike group units also protected the Iraqi oil terminals at Al Başrah and Khor Al Amaya.

On 25 September 2007, the Tanzanian-flagged passenger ferry Spice Islander I was off the coast of Somalia when she experienced engine problems due to contaminated fuel. After the alarm had been raised via Kenya, the destroyer Stout, operating with Combined Task Force 150, was dispatched to her aid. Spice Islander had been on a voyage from Oman to Tanzania, and it was not carrying any passengers. The destroyer James E. Williams also responded. Stout provided the ship with 7,800 US gallons (30,000 L; 6,500 imp gal) of fuel and supplied the ten-man crew with food and water. After her engines were restarted, she resumed her voyage to Tanzania.

On the morning of 30 October 2007, Combined Maritime Forces received a call from the International Maritime Bureau in Malaysia, regarding the North Korean cargo vessel Dai Hong Dan (pictured), which had been taken over the previous day by Somali pirates. The ship was approximately 60 nautical miles (110 km) northeast of Mogadishu, Somalia. The guided-missile destroyer James E. Williams was about 50 nautical miles (93 km) from the vessel, and sent a helicopter to investigate the situation. Williams arrived in the vicinity of the Korean ship at midday, local time, and contacted the pirates, ordering them to give up their weapons. The Korean crew then confronted the Somali pirates and regained control of the ship. The crew said the pirates had been in control of the bridge, but the crew had retained control of the steering and engineering spaces. The James E. Williams crew provided care and assistance for approximately 12 hours to crew members and Somali pirates aboard Dai Hong Dan. Six pirates were captured, and one was killed. The pirates remained aboard Dai Hong Dan.

On 5 November 2007, James E. Williams and Arleigh Burke provided aid to the crew of MV Ching Fong Hwa 168 (pictured), a Taiwanese-flagged fishing trawler that had been seized by pirates off the coast of Somalia in May. After the Somali pirates returned to shore, the destroyer escorted the Taiwanese ship out of Somali waters and provided needed supplies and medical assistance. Finally, the guided-missile destroyer Forrest Sherman executed a circumnavigation of the African continent while performing theater security operations with local military forces as the flagship of Task Group 60.5, the U.S. Navy's Southeast Africa task force.

Carrier Strike Group Twelve transited the Suez Canal on 1 December 2007, and the group returned to Norfolk on 13 December 2007.

For this deployment, Enterprise received the Battle "E" award, the Battenberg Cup, and the Admiral Flatley Memorial Award for the year 2007. Also during this deployment, the strike group was the second U.S. Navy carrier strike group to deploy with the new ASQ-228 Advanced Targeting Forward Looking Infrared (ATFLIR) targeting system for its F/A-18 strike fighters. This new system allowed its pilots to use their weapon systems at higher altitude with greater accuracy and safety. Finally, the 2007 deployment marked the final cruise for squadron VS-32 and its S-3 Viking aircraft (pictured). During this deployment, VS-32 aircraft flew 960 sorties, which totaled more than 2,200 flight hours, and included more than 950 carrier landings. Squadron VS-32 operated at sea for 180 days with only 13 days spent in port.

2007 deployment force composition

Warships	Carrier Air Wing One squadrons embarked aboard USS Enterprise (CVN-65)	
USS Gettysburg (CG-64)	Strike Fighter Squadron 211 (VFA-211): 14 F/A-18F	Carrier Airborne Early Warning Squadron 123 (VAW-123): 4 E-2C NP
USS Forrest Sherman (DDG-98)	Marine Fighter Attack Squadron 251 (VMFA-251): 10 F/A-18C(N)	Sea Control Squadron 32 (VS-32): S-3B
USS James E. Williams (DDG-95)	Strike Fighter Squadron 136 (VFA-136): 12 F/A-18C	Helicopter Antisubmarine Squadron 11 (HS-11): 7 SH-60F/HH-60H
USS Stout (DDG-55)	Strike Fighter Squadron 86 (VFA-86): 13 F/A-18C(N)	Fleet Logistics Support Squadron 40 (VRC-40), Det. 4: 2 C-2A
USS Arleigh Burke (DDG-51)	Electronic Attack Squadron 137 (VAQ-137): 4 EA-6B	——
USS Philadelphia (SSN-690)	——	——
USNS Supply (T-AOE-6)	——	——

2007–2008 deployment exercises and port visits

Number	Regional Exercises				Port Visits		Notes
Number	Duration	U.S. Force	Bilateral/Multilateral Partner(s)	Operating Area	Location	Dates	Notes
1st:	—	Carrier Strike Group 12	——	——	Cannes, France	24–27 Jul 2007	
2nd:	——	Forrest Sherman, Arleigh Burke	——	——	Souda Bay, Crete	26 July 2007	
3rd:	August 2007	Forrest Sherman	Reliant Mermaid 2007: Israeli Navy, Turkish Navy	Mediterranean Sea	Sevastopol, Ukraine	8 August 2007	
4th:	——	Forrest Sherman	——	——	Dar es Salaam, Tanzania	5 September 2007	
5th:	——	Forrest Sherman	——	——	Moroni, Comoros	12 September 2007	
6th:	——	Forrest Sherman	——	——	Maputo, Mazambique	17 September 2007	
7th:	——	Forrest Sherman	——	——	Durban, South Africa	16 September 2007	
8th:	——	Forrest Sherman	——	——	Cape Town, South Africa	5 October 2007	
9th:	——	Forrest Sherman	——	——	Pointe Noire, Republic of the Congo	26 October 2007	
10th:	10–13 Nov 2007	Carrier Strike Group 12	Anti-submarine warfare: USS Miami (SSN-755)	North Arabian Sea	Jebel Ali, United Arab Emirates	21 October 2007	
11th:	——	Enterprise	——	——	Naval Station Mayport	16 December 2007	

=== 2008–2010 operations ===
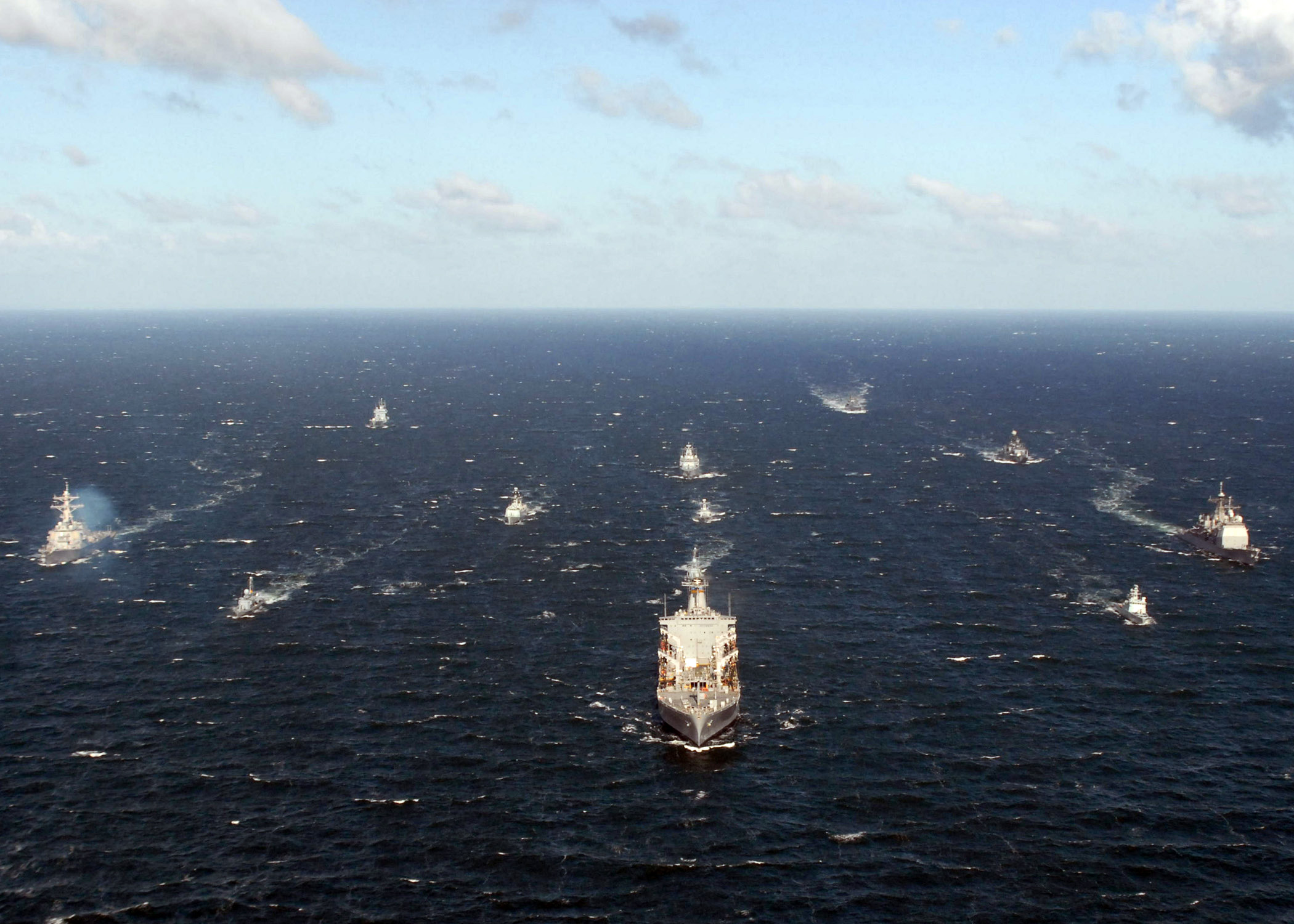
BALTOPS 2008 (11 June 2008)

On 11 April 2008, Enterprise began a two-year, US$661.7 million Extended Drydocking Selected Restricted Availability (EDSRA) overhaul at the Northrop Grumman Newport News shipyard in Virginia.

While his flagship was going into refit, Rear Admiral Daniel P. Holloway was given the task of supervising Exercise BALTOPS 2008, that took place from 8 to 18 June 2008 (pictured). BALTOPS began in 1971 as a NATO freedom of navigation exercise directed against the Soviet Union in the Baltic, and it is now a Partnership for Peace interoperability exercise involving former Warsaw Pact adversaries, including Russia. Holloway used the guided-missile cruiser Gettysburg as his temporary flagship which was joined by two other U.S. naval vessels, the guided-missile destroyer Cole from Destroyer Squadron 22 and the fleet oiler Patuxent from the Military Sealift Command, to form Task Group 369.4. Gettysburg returned to Naval Station Mayport, Florida, on 14 July 2008.

Enterprise returned to Naval Station Norfolk on 19 April 2010 after completing its post-overhaul sea trials, signalling the start of the pre-deployment training cycle for Carrier Strike Group Twelve.

=== 2011 deployment ===
On 13 January 2011, Carrier Strike Group Twelve departed its home base of Naval Station Norfolk, Virginia, under the command of Rear Admiral Terry B. Kraft. The strike group entered the U.S. Sixth Fleet's area of responsibility on 20 January 2011 and following its transit of the Suez Canal on 15 February 2011, joined the U.S. Fifth Fleet.

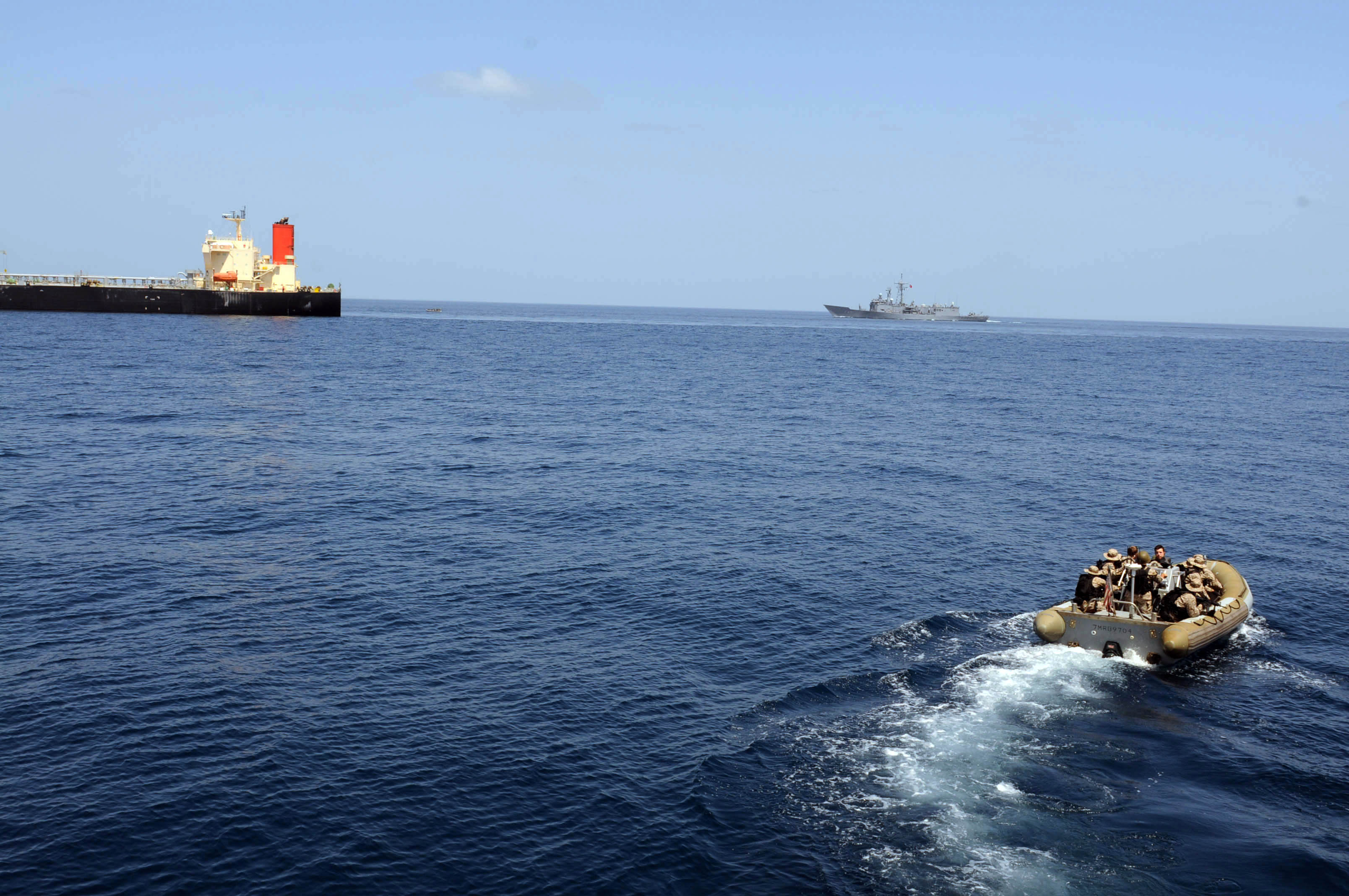
MV Guanabara (6 March 2011)

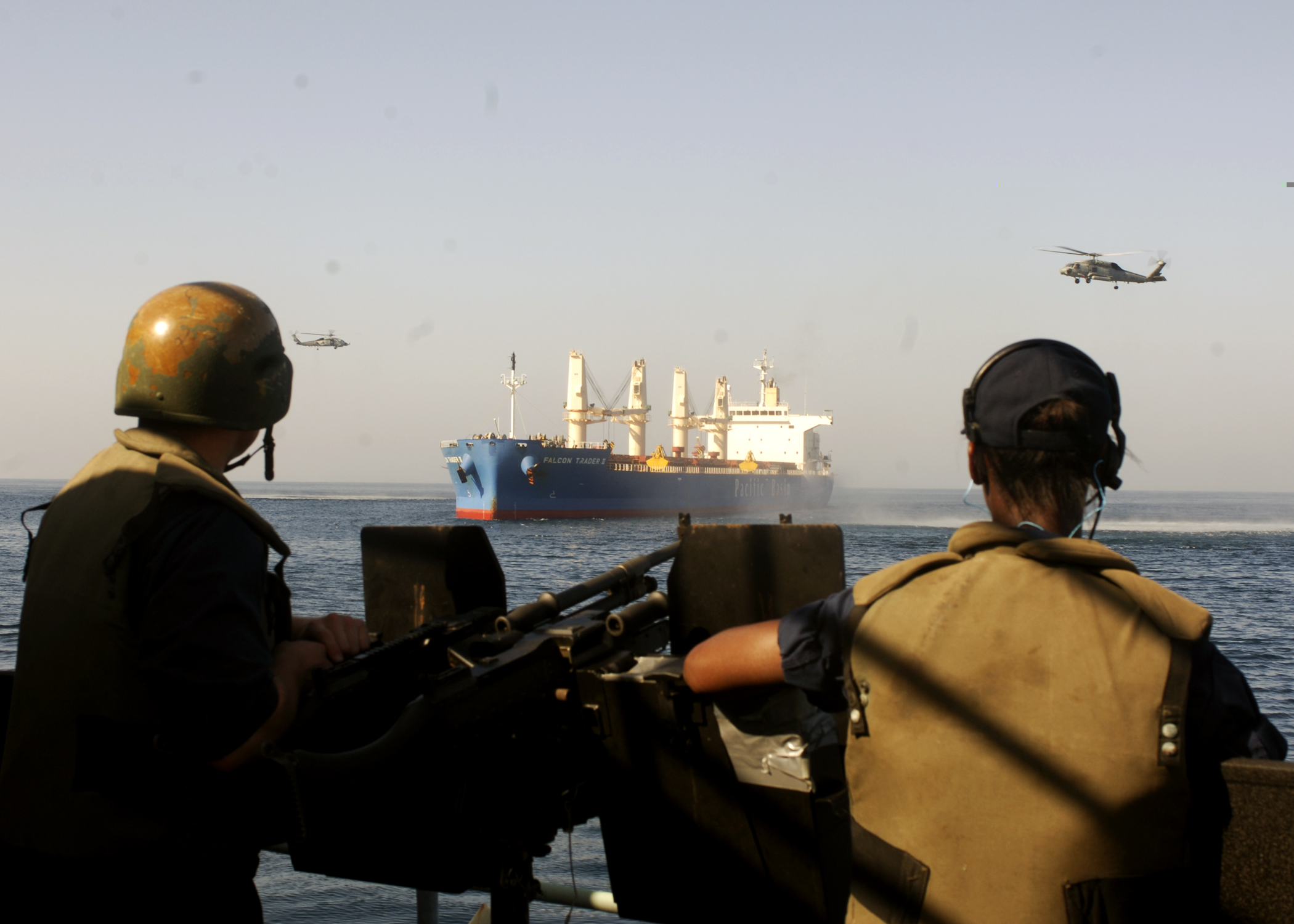
MV Falcon Trader II (24 March 2011)

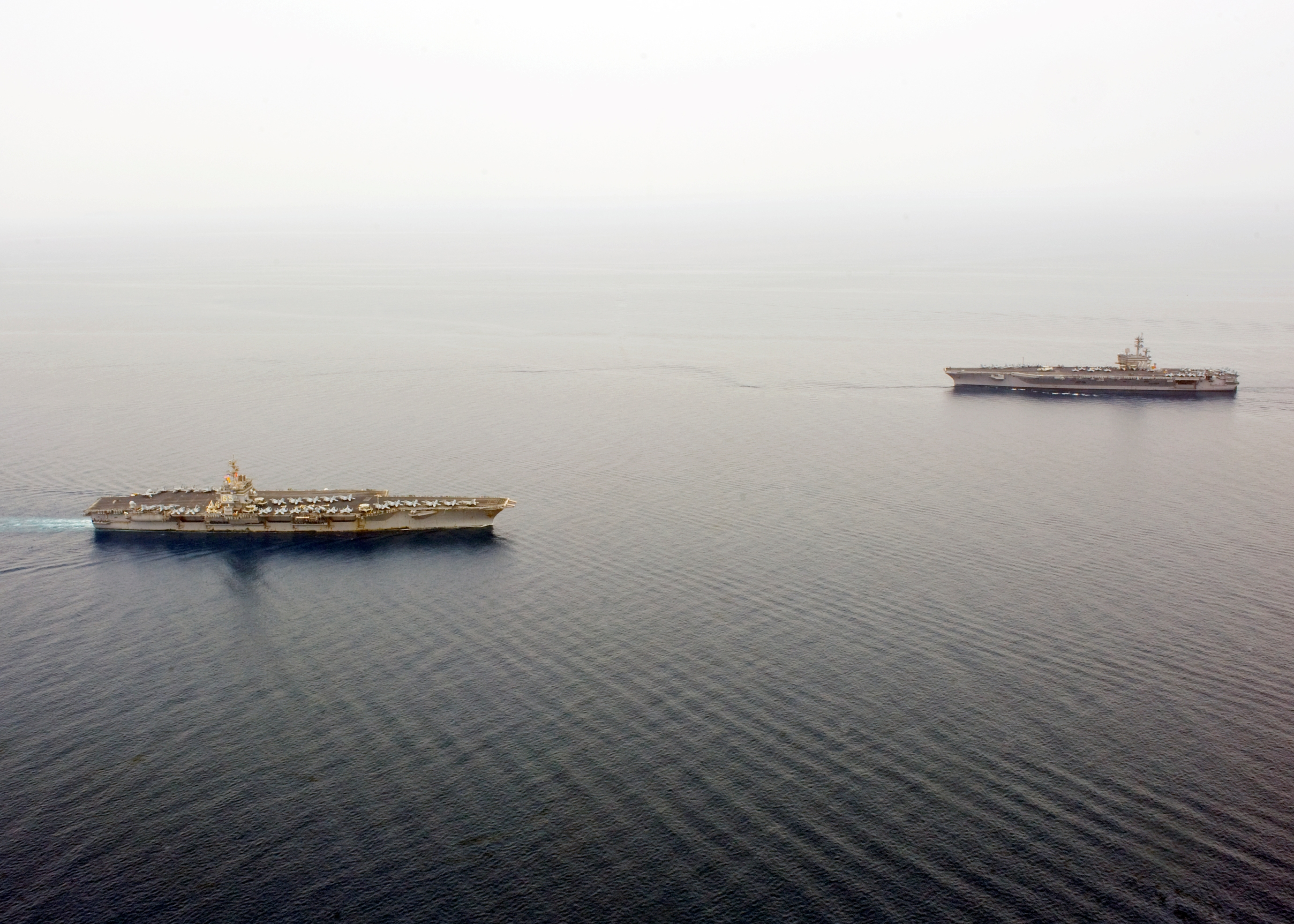
Enterprise (left) and George H.W. Bush at the Strait of Bab el Mandeb (21 June 2011)

During the 2011 deployment, aircraft from Carrier Air Wing One flew 7764 sorties, with more than 7120 combat sorties in support of Operation Enduring Freedom in Afghanistan. Units of Carrier Strike Group Twelve also disrupted nine piracy attacks, resulting in the capture of 75 suspected pirates and the detention of an additional 18 suspected pirates. Also during this deployment, the guided-missile destroyer Barry was detached from Carrier Strike Group Twelve in order to participate in Operation Odyssey Dawn. During that operation, on 19 March 2011, Barry was credited with launching the 2000th Tomahawk land-attack cruise missile.

In February 2011, Enterprise, Leyte Gulf, Sterrett. and Buckley, as well as the guided-missile destroyer Sterett, responded to the seizure of the American yacht Quest by Somali pirates off the coast of Oman. During this event four pirates were killed, and 15 were taken into custody. Enterprise is the first U.S. aircraft carrier to directly support a counter-piracy incident. Enterprise and Leyte Gulf also supported the recapture of the 37,000 DWT Liberian-flagged bulk carrier MV Arrilah-1 from Somali pirates by United Arab Emirates special operation forces on 2 April 2011.

On 6 March 2011, while operating with Combined Task Force 151, the destroyer Buckley responded to a distress call from the Bahamian-flagged, Japanese-operated oil tanker MV Guanabara which had reported on the previous day of being under attack from Somali pirates while operating 328 nautical miles (607 km; 377 mi) southeast of Duqm, Oman. Joining Buckley was the Turkish frigate Giresun from NATO's Operation Ocean Shield. After determining that Guanabara's crew was safely in the ship's citadel, Bulkeley's boarding team, supported overhead by its embarked SH-60 helicopter, secured the Bahamian-flagged vessel and detained four suspected pirates (pictured). Three of the pirates were subsequently indicted in Japan, and the fourth was turned over to juvenile authorities, as it was determined that he was a minor.

On 24 March 2011, units from Carrier Strike Group Twelve disrupted a pirate attack on the Philippine-flagged merchant vessel MV Falcon Trader II. While operating in the Arabian Sea in support of Operation Enduring Freedom, at 10:00 A.M. local time, the carrier Enterprise and cruiser Leyte Gulf responded to a distress call from Falcon Trader II reporting that suspected pirates in a small skiff were attempting to board the ship. A follow-up message reported that the pirates had boarded Falcon Trader II, but confirmed that her crew was safely in the ship's citadel. A SH-60F helicopter from squadron HS-11 embarked on Enterprise and a SH-60B helicopter from squadron HSL-48 on board Leyte Gulf were dispatched to investigate the situation. Once on the scene, the HS-11 helicopter fired warning shots at the suspected pirates in the skiff, prompting them to flee the scene. The helicopter pursued the skiff which was observed trying to rendezvous with a suspected pirate mother ship. The helicopter came under small arms fire, but the flight crew were not harmed while the helicopter maintained surveillance of the situation. On 25 March 2011, after determining there were no pirates aboard, Leyte Gulf sent a boarding party to Falcon Trader II to free its crew (pictured).

On 16 May 2011, Bulkeley responded to a mayday call from the Panamanian-flagged, German-owned, 306,500 DWT very large crude carrier Artemis Glory. Bulkeley dispatched a SH-60B helicopter to the last reported position of the ship. Observing that a skiff carrying four men was firing upon Artemis Glory, the HSL-48 helicopter opened fire, killing four suspected pirates. Without any Navy or Artemis Glory casualties, the ship was able to continue to its next port-of-call.

On 21 June 2011, the Navy's oldest aircraft carrier – Enterprise – passed the Navy's newest carrier, George H.W. Bush, in the Bab el-Mandeb Strait (pictured) as Carrier Strike Group Two relieved Carrier Strike Group Twelve as the Fifth Fleet's in-theater carrier strike group. Carrier Strike Group Twelve transited the Suez Canal on 24 June 2011 and the Strait of Gibraltar on 3 July 2011. On 15 July 2011, the group returned to Naval Station Norfolk, Virginia, completing its 2011 deployment.

2011 deployment force composition

Warships	Carrier Air Wing One squadrons embarked aboard USS Enterprise (CVN-65)	
USS Leyte Gulf (CG-55)	Marine Fighter Attack Squadron 251 (VMFA-251): 12 F/A-18C(N)	Electronic Attack Squadron 137 (VAQ-137): 4 EA-6B
USS Mason (DDG-87)	Strike Fighter Squadron 211 (VFA-211): 11 F/A-18F	Carrier Airborne Early Warning Squadron 123 (VAW-123): 4 E-2C NP
USS Bulkeley (DDG-84)	Strike Fighter Squadron 136 (VFA-136): 12 F/A-18E	Helicopter Antisubmarine Squadron 11 (HS-11): 7 SH-60F/HH-60H
USS Barry (DDG-52)	Strike Fighter Squadron 11 (VFA-11): 13 F/A-18F	Fleet Logistics Support Squadron 40 (VRC-40), Det. 3: 2 C-2A
USNS Arctic (T-AOE-8)	——	——

2011 deployment exercises and port visits

Number	Regional Exercises/Operations				Port Visits		Notes
Number	Duration	U.S. Force	Bilateral/Multilateral Partner(s)	Operating Area	Location	Dates	Notes
1st:	——	Carrier Strike Group 12	——	——	Lisbon, Portugal	26–29 Jan 2011	
2nd:	——	Barry	——	——	Valletta, Malta	29 Jan to 1 February 2011	
3rd:	——	Mason	——	——	Palma de Mallorca, Spain	30 Jan to 1 February 2011	
4th:	——	Enterprise, Leyte Gulf	——	——	Marmaris, Turkey	7–11 Feb 2011	
5th:	——	Barry	——	——	Djibouti	10 February 2011	
6th:	——	Mason	——	——	Haifa, Israel	15 March 2011	
7th:	——	Barry	——	——	Augusta Bay, Italy	31 March 2011	
8th:	19 Mar to 9 April 2011	Enterprise, Leyte Gulf	Operation Enduring Freedom: ISAF (Note: Over 1450 combat sorties were flown by Carrier Air Wing One from 19 March to 9 April 2011.)	North Arabian Sea	Manama, Bahrain	12–16 Apr 2011	
9th:	——	Barry	——	——	Rhodes, Greece	5–11 May 2011	
10th:	17–28 Apr 2011	Enterprise	Operation New Dawn: Multi-National Force – Iraq	Persian Gulf	Jebel Ali, United Arab Emirates	9 May 2011	
11th:	——	Barry	——	——	Gaeta, Italy	12–17 Jun 2011	
12th:	——	Bulkeley	——	——	Raphael, France	22–24 Jun 2011	
13th:	——	Enterprise	——	——	Souda Bay, Greece	25 June 2011	
14th:	——	Bulkeley	——	——	Menorca, Spain	25–27 Jun 2011	
16th:	——	Barry	——	——	Rota, Spain	26 June 2011	
17th:	2 May to 2 June 2011	Enterprise	Operation Enduring Freedom: ISAF (Note: 2970 combat sorties were flown by Carrier Air Wing One from 2 May to 2 June 2011.)	North Arabian Sea	Palma de Mallorca, Spain	28 Jun to 2 July 2011	
19th:	1 July 2011	Bulkeley	Disaster training exercise: Portuguese Navy	In-port	Lisbon, Portugal	1–4 Jul 2011	
20th:	——	Mason	——	——	Bodrum, Turkey	9 July 2011	
21st:	——	Enterprise	——	——	Naval Station Mayport	13 July 2011	

=== 2012 deployment ===
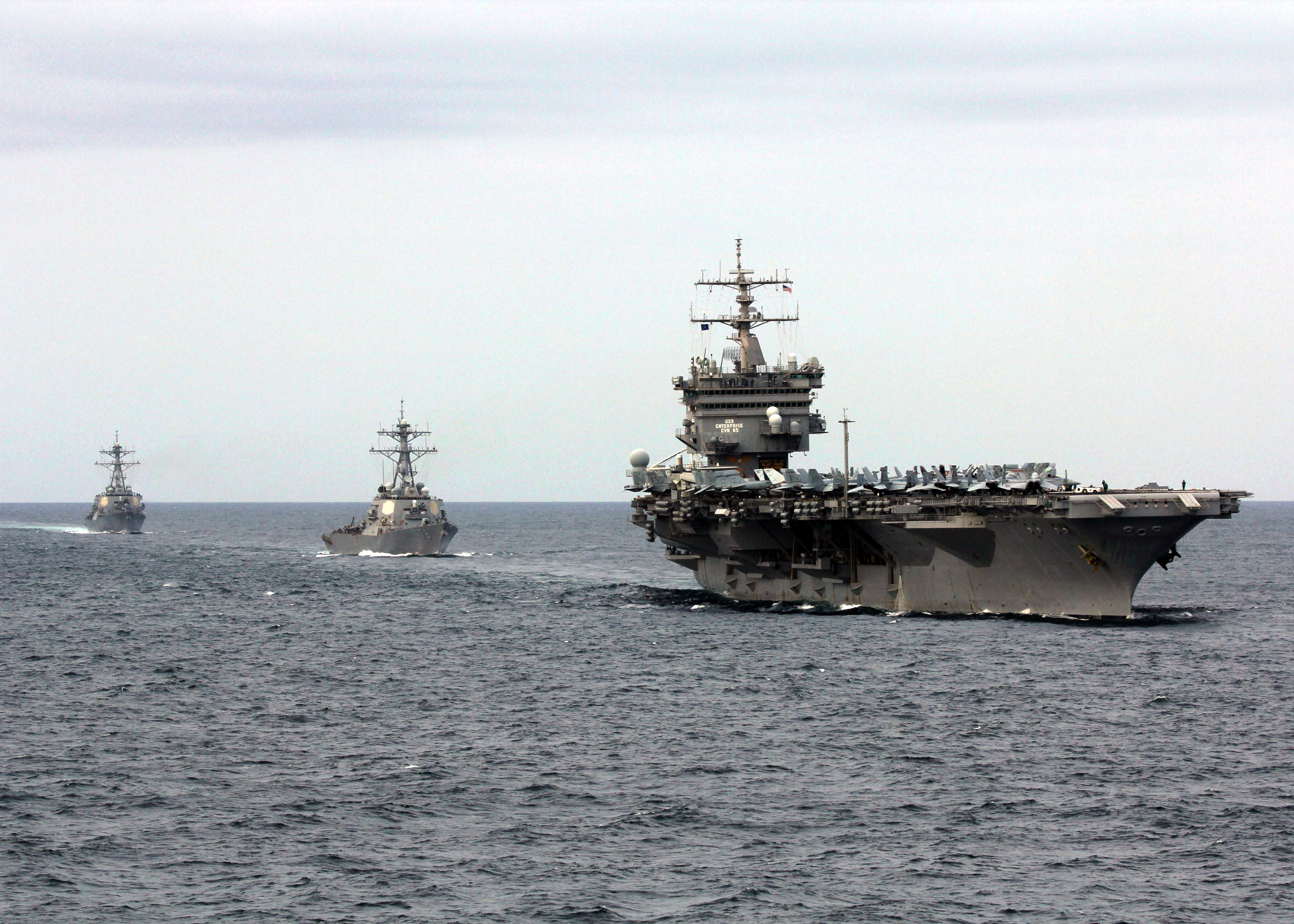
Bold Alligator 2013 (4 February 2012)

On 11 January 2012, the strike group proceeded to sea for pre-deployment training and its Composite Training Unit Exercise. From 30 January to 12 February 2012, the group took part in Bold Alligator 2012, the largest amphibious assault exercise held on the east coast of the United States since 2002. Bold Alligator 2012 also served as the group Joint Task Force Exercise, the final pre-deployment training exercise needed to receive its combat-readiness certification. During the exercise, the air wing completed 3,830 flight hours, made 2,052 arrested landings, and received a 96 percent sortie completion rate. This included a single-day total of 107 sorties flown on 6 February 2012 during the exercise amphibious assault phase. U.S. Secretary of Defense Leon Panetta visited Enterprise on 21 January 2012, observing flight operations and meeting members of the crew. The strike group completed its pre-deployment training and returned to Naval Station Norfolk, Virginia, on 10 February 2012.

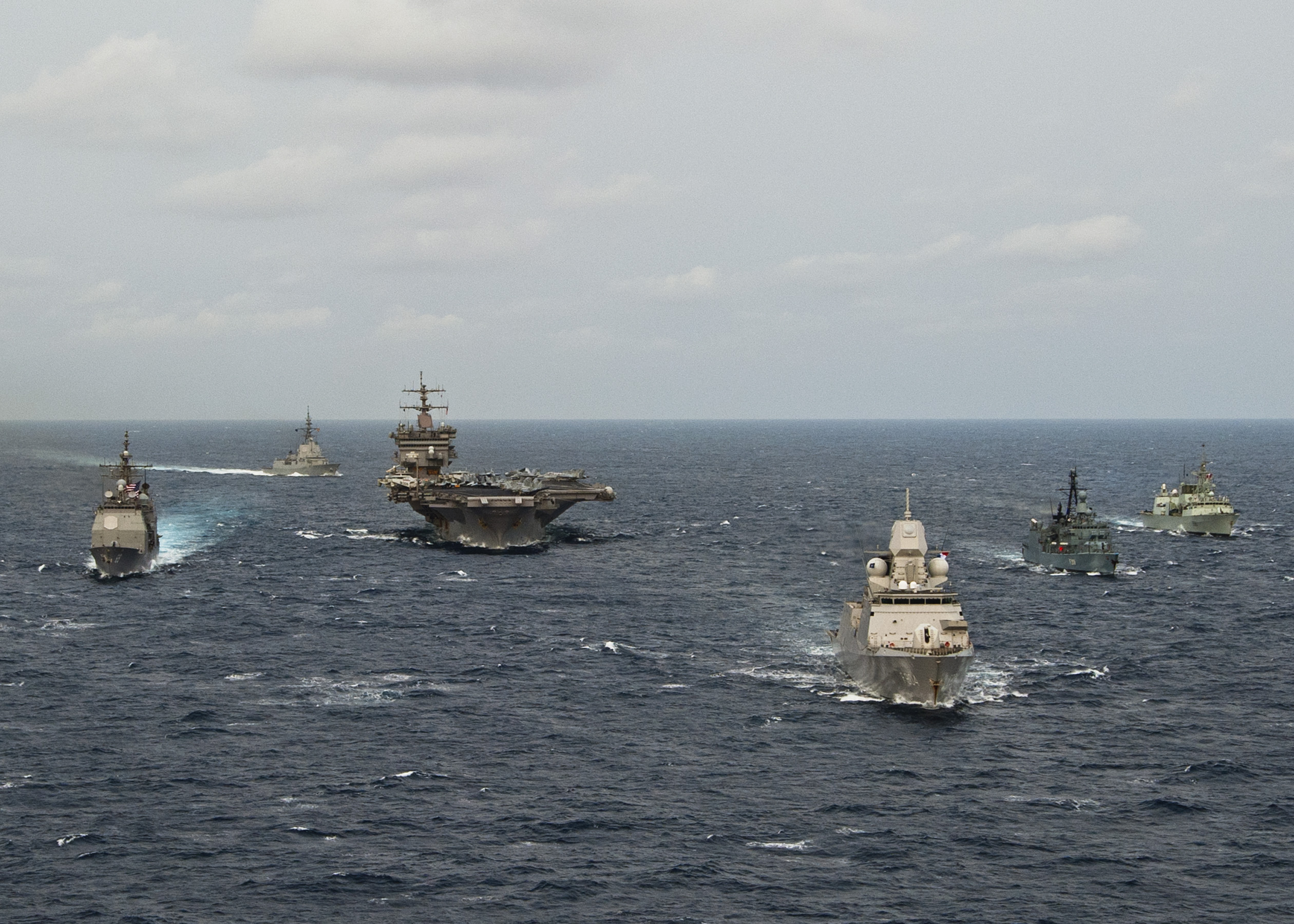
PASSEX with Standing NATO Maritime Group 1 (24 March 2012)

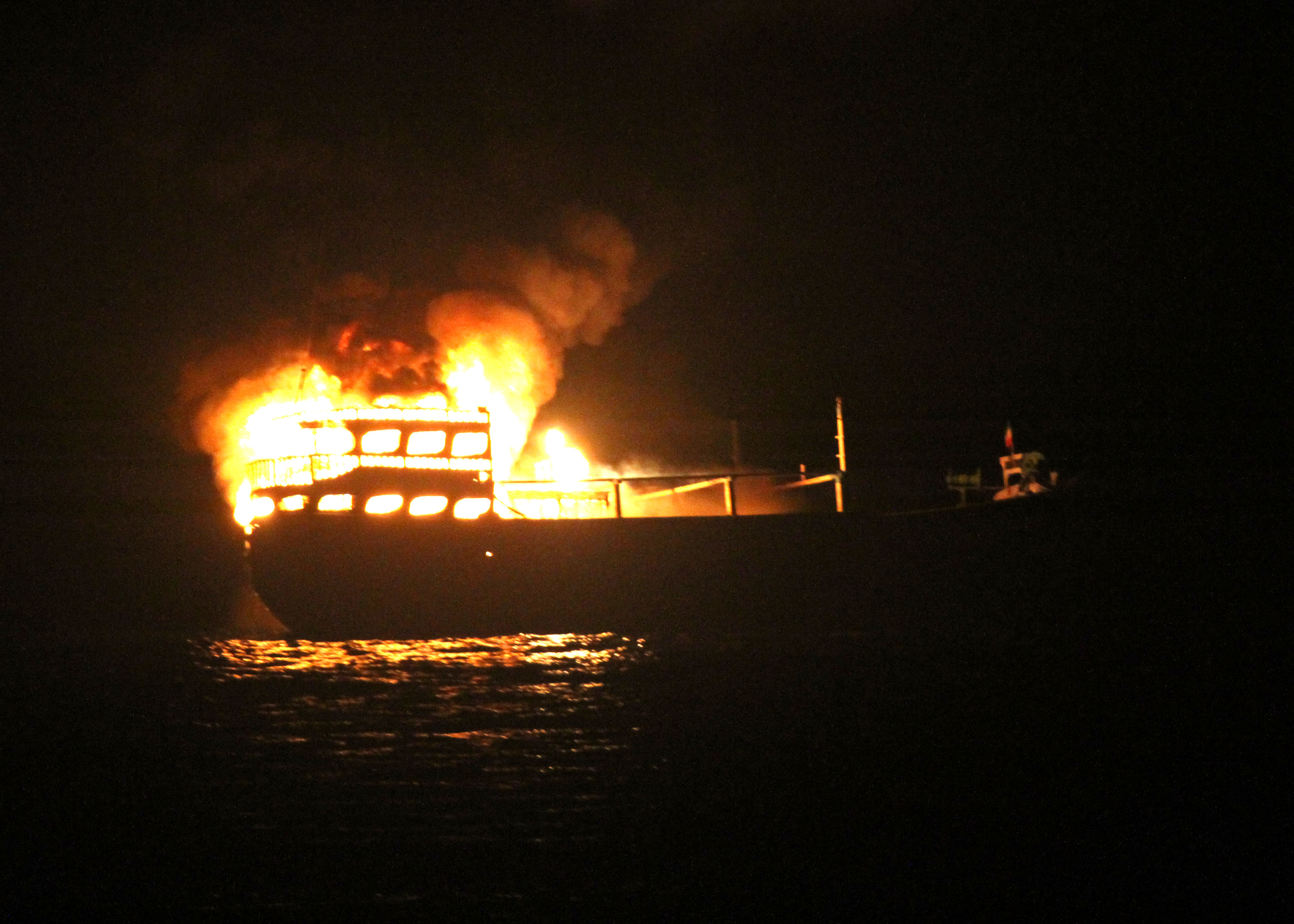
Dhow on fire in the Gulf of Oman on 8 August 2012.

On 11 March 2012, the group departed Naval Station Norfolk, Virginia, for its 2012 deployment under the command of Rear Admiral Walter E. Carter Jr. The strike group transited the Strait of Gibraltar on 23 March 2012, and it subsequently conducted a passing exercise with Standing NATO Maritime Group 1 between 24 and 25 March 2012 (pictured).

The strike group transited the Suez Canal to join the U.S. Fifth Fleet on 3 April. On 8 April 2012, the guided-missile destroyer Porter was detached in order to join Combined Task Force 151 for counter-piracy operations in the Gulf of Aden.

On 1 May 2012, Carrier Strike Group Twelve began combat air support to the International Security Assistance Force in Afghanistan, with Carrier Air Wing One flying 29 sorties that first day. The strike group operated with Carrier Strike Group Nine until CSG-9 was relieved by Carrier Strike Group Eight on 16–17 July 2012. In total, aircraft from Carrier Air Wing One flew 9,875 sorties, of which 2,241 were combat missions, while the Enterprise made ten transits through the Strait of Hormuz. The average flight time per sortie was almost six hours per flight. During this deployment, the strike group's longest at-sea period was 52 days.

On the evening of 8 August 2013, the guided-missile destroyer James E. Williams rescued ten mariners from a burning Iranian-flagged dhow (pictured) while operating in the Gulf of Oman. Of the ten mariners, eight were identified as Iranians and two were Pakistanis. The rescued mariners received medical treatment and transport to the carrier Enterprise before being repatriated back to Iran on 10 August. James E. Williams reentered the Mediterranean Sea on 25 August.

On 12 August 2012, at 1:00 a.m. local time, the guided-missile destroyer Porter collided with the Panamanian-flagged, Japanese-owned oil tanker MV Otowasan near the Strait of Hormuz. The collision ripped a large hole in Porter's starboard side above the waterline, forcing her to put into Jebel Ali, Dubai, for inspection and repairs. No one on either ship was injured from the collision. Otowasan had been en route from Fujairah, United Arab Emirates, to Mesaieed, Qatar, at the time of the collision.

On 12 October 2012, the strike group transited the Suez Canal, with Porter rejoining following extensive repairs. From 24–26 October, Enterprise offloaded munitions to USNS Sacagawea and USNS Matthew Perry, at sea in the Atlantic. On 4 November, Enterprise returned to Naval Base Norfolk, Virginia, after steaming 80,968 nautical miles (149,953 km; 93,176 mi) during its seven-and-a-half-month deployment.

2012 deployment force composition

Warships	Carrier Air Wing One squadrons embarked aboard USS Enterprise (CVN-65)	
USS Vicksburg (CG-69)	Marine Fighter Attack Squadron 251 (VMFA-251): 9 F/A-18C(N)	Electronic Attack Squadron 137 (VAQ-137): 4 EA-6B
USS James E. Williams (DDG-95)	Strike Fighter Squadron 211 (VFA-211): 11 F/A-18F	Carrier Airborne Early Warning Squadron 123 (VAW-123): 4 E-2C NP
USS Nitze (DDG-94)	Strike Fighter Squadron 136 (VFA-136): 12 F/A-18E	Helicopter Antisubmarine Squadron 11 (HS-11): 7 SH-60F/HH-60H
USS Porter (DDG-78)	Strike Fighter Squadron 11 (VFA-11): 11 F/A-18F	Fleet Logistics Support Squadron 40 (VRC-40), Det. 3: 2 C-2A

2012 deployment combat operations, exercises, and port visits

Number	Regional Exercises				Port Visits		Notes
Number	Duration	U.S. Force	Bilateral/Multilateral Partner(s)	Operating Area	Location	Dates	Notes
1st:	24–25 March 2012	Carrier Strike Group 12	PASSEX: Standing NATO Maritime Group 1	Mediterranean Sea	——	——	
2nd:	——	Nitze	——	——	Villefranche, France	26–29 Mar 2012	
3rd:	——	Porter	——	——	Palma de Mallorca, Spain	26–30 Mar 2012	
4th:	——	James E. Williams	——	——	Civitavecchia, Italy	26–29 Mar 2012	
5th:	——	Enterprise, Vicksburg	——	——	Piraeus, Greece	28–31 Mar 2012	
6th:	6 April 2012	Nitze	PASSEX: Egyptian corvette El Suez (F941)	Red Sea	Manama, Bahrain	17 May 2012	
7th:	——	James E. Williams	——	——	Manama, Bahrain	18 April 2012	
8th:	16–21 Apr 2012	Carrier Strike Group 12	FS Cassard (D 614), HMS Daring (D32)	Arabian Sea	Jebel Ali, United Arab Emirates	24–28 Apr 2012	
9th:	1 May to 16 July 2012	Enterprise, Vicksburg	Operation Enduring Freedom: ISAF (Note: Over 2241 combat sorties were flown by Carrier Air Wing One from 1 May to 16 July 2012.)	North Arabian Sea	Manama, Bahrain	20–28 May 2012	
10th:	——	Porter	——	——	Hidd, Bahrain	22–25 Jun 2012	
11th:	27 July 2012	Nitze	PASSEX: HMCS Charlottetown (FFH 339)	Arabian Sea	Victoria, Seychelles	24 June 2012	
12th:	——	Enterprise, Vicksburg	——	——	Jebel Ali, United Arab Emirates	1–6 Jul 2012	
13th:	8 August 2012	Carrier Strike Group 12	PASSEX: HMS Diamond (D34)	Arabian Sea	Khalifa Bin Salman Port, Bahrain	11–12 Aug 2012	
14th:	——	Vicksburg	——	——	Manama, Bahrain	10–24 Aug 2012	
15th:	——	Enterprise	——	——	Jebel Ali, United Arab Emirates	25 August 2012	
15th:	——	Enterprise, Vicksburg	——	——	Jebel Ali, United Arab Emirates	28 September 2012	
16th:	——	Enterprise, Nitze	——	——	Naples, Italy	16–21 Oct 2012	
17th:	——	Vicksburg, Porter	——	——	Lisbon, Portugal	17 October 2012	
18th:	——	Enterprise	——	——	Naval Station Mayport, Florida	31 Oct to 2 November 2012	

=== Enterprise inactivates, cruiser changes ===
Enterprise was inactivated on 1 December 2012 at Norfolk Naval Station, Virginia. USS Theodore Roosevelt (CVN-71) was reassigned as the group's new flagship. Carrier Air Wing One was reassigned from Enterprise to Roosevelt.

Initially, the U.S. Navy had planned to retire Vicksburg along with three other Ticonderoga-class cruisers in fiscal year 2013. However, after much discussion, Vicksburg and two other Ticonderoga-class cruisers were retained under the National Defense Authorization Act for Fiscal Year 2013, with Vicksburg joining USS Normandy as units of Carrier Strike Group Twelve.

On 14 January 2014, the Navy announced that Theodore Roosevelt was to shift its homeport to Naval Base San Diego, California and the U.S. Pacific Fleet. With Theodore Roosevelt's homeport change, USS Ronald Reagan relocated to Japan in 2015 as part of the U.S. Navy's preparation for the planned refueling and overhaul of USS George Washington.

=== 2013–2014 operations ===
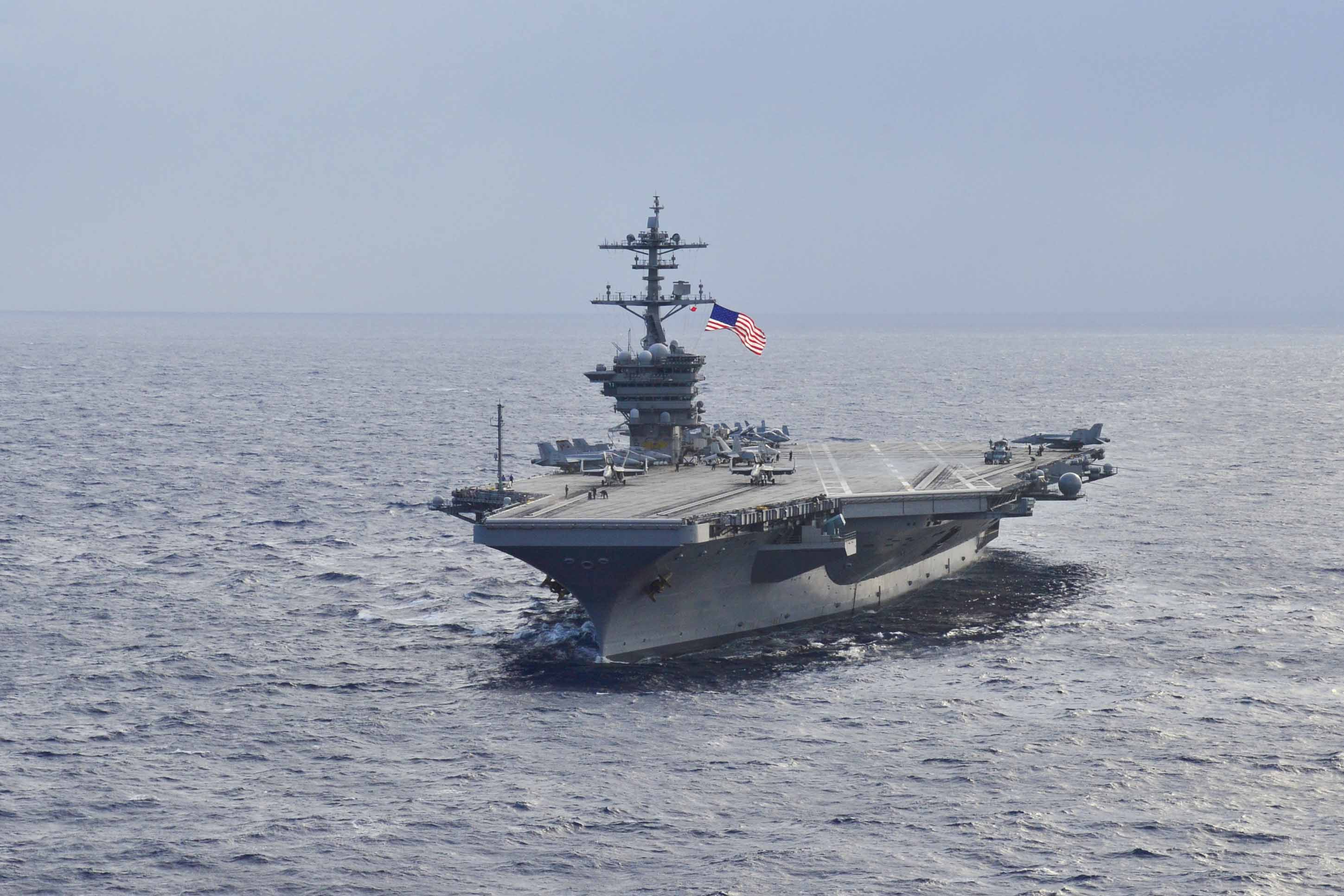
Atlantic Ocean (18 September 2014)

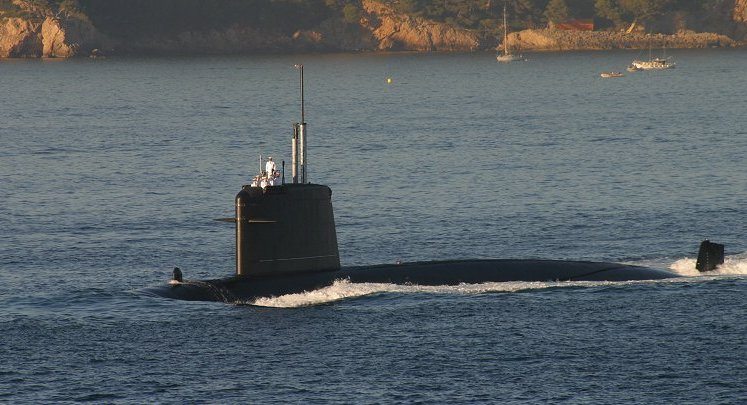
French submarine Saphir

On 22 October 2012, the Department of Defense announced that Rear Admiral Kevin Kovacich was selected to take command of Carrier Strike Group Twelve. A naval aviator, Admiral Kovacich took command of the strike group on 15 April 2013.

Theodore Roosevelt returned to Norfolk Naval Station, Virginia, on 29 August 2013, completing its post-overhaul sea trials that concluded its four-year mid-life Refueling and Complex Overhaul. On 14 September 2013, Theodore Roosevelt successfully completed flight deck certification which entailed completing a total of 160 carrier landings during daytime and night-time operations. Other certification drills included rigging the emergency barricade, flight deck firefighting evolutions, and crash and salvage operations. On 17 September 2013, Theodore Roosevelt completed its first underway replenishment in over four years.

At the start of 2014, Theodore Roosevelt and the rest of Carrier Strike Group Twelve were in port and not underway. On 15 January 2014, Theodore Roosevelt departed Naval Station Norfolk, Virginia, for carrier qualifications prior to undertaking the group pre-deployment exercise. On 20 March 2014, the U.S. Defense Department announced Admiral Kovacich's next assignment was as the director for plans and programs of the U.S. African Command, and his relief was Rear Admiral Andrew L. Lewis, a naval aviator.

On 17 July 2014, Carrier Strike Group 12 carried out-at-sea maneuvers, and the carrier Harry S. Truman off-loaded its munitions to Theodore Roosevelt on 17 July 2014 in preparation for future deployments by Carrier Strike Group 12. Between 4 and 8 August 2014, Theodore Roosevelt completed the in-port phase of its Tailored Ship's Training Availability (TSTA) exercises. On 16 September 2014, Carrier Strike Group 12 began the at-sea phase of its TSTA exercises, as well as its Final Evaluation Problem (FEP) exercises, completing these exercises on 8 October 2014. On 8 January 2015, Carrier Strike Group 12 began its Composite Training Unit Exercise (COMPTUEX). This three-week-long series of exercises test the strike group's ability to perform as an integrated formation within real-world scenarios prior to departing for its upcoming 2015 overseas deployment. Also, between 9 and 10 January 2015, Theodore Roosevelt on-loaded munitions during underway replenishment with from the dry cargo ship Robert E. Peary.

On 4 March 2015, it was reported in a blogspot of the French Navy and French Ministry of Defense that during a recent training exercise off Florida the French nuclear submarine Saphir (pictured) as part of the "enemy" attack group had successfully "sunk" the aircraft carrier Theodore Roosevelt and its escorts.

=== 2015 world cruise ===
On 9 March 2015, Carrier Strike Group Twelve departed Naval Station Norfolk, Virginia, to begin its 2015 around-the-world deployment. The group's flagship, Theodore Roosevelt, was delayed by a faulty seawater intake valve and did not get underway until 11 March 2015. The 2015 deployment was scheduled to conclude with Theodore Roosevelt's arrival at its new homeport of San Diego Naval Base, California. The group was the first U.S. Navy carrier strike group to deploy with the new Naval Integrated Fire Control-Counter Air (NIFC-CA) capability. NIFC-CA integrates all units via data links to gain a more comprehensive overview of its operational battlespace.

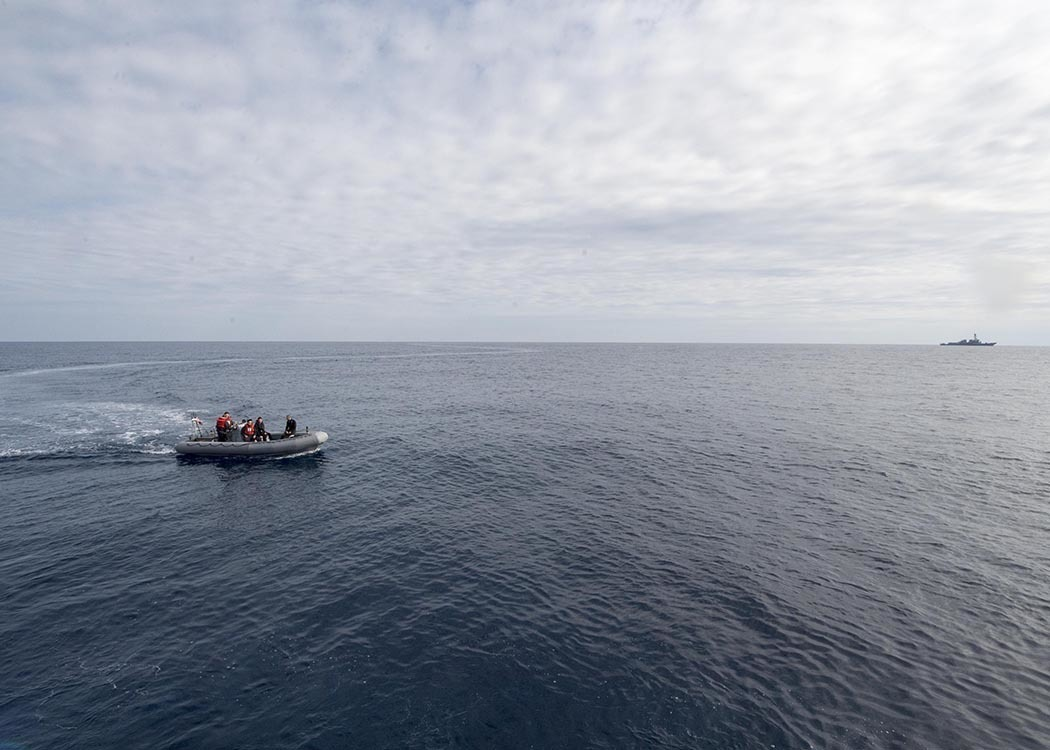
Narcotics retrieval (21 March 2015)

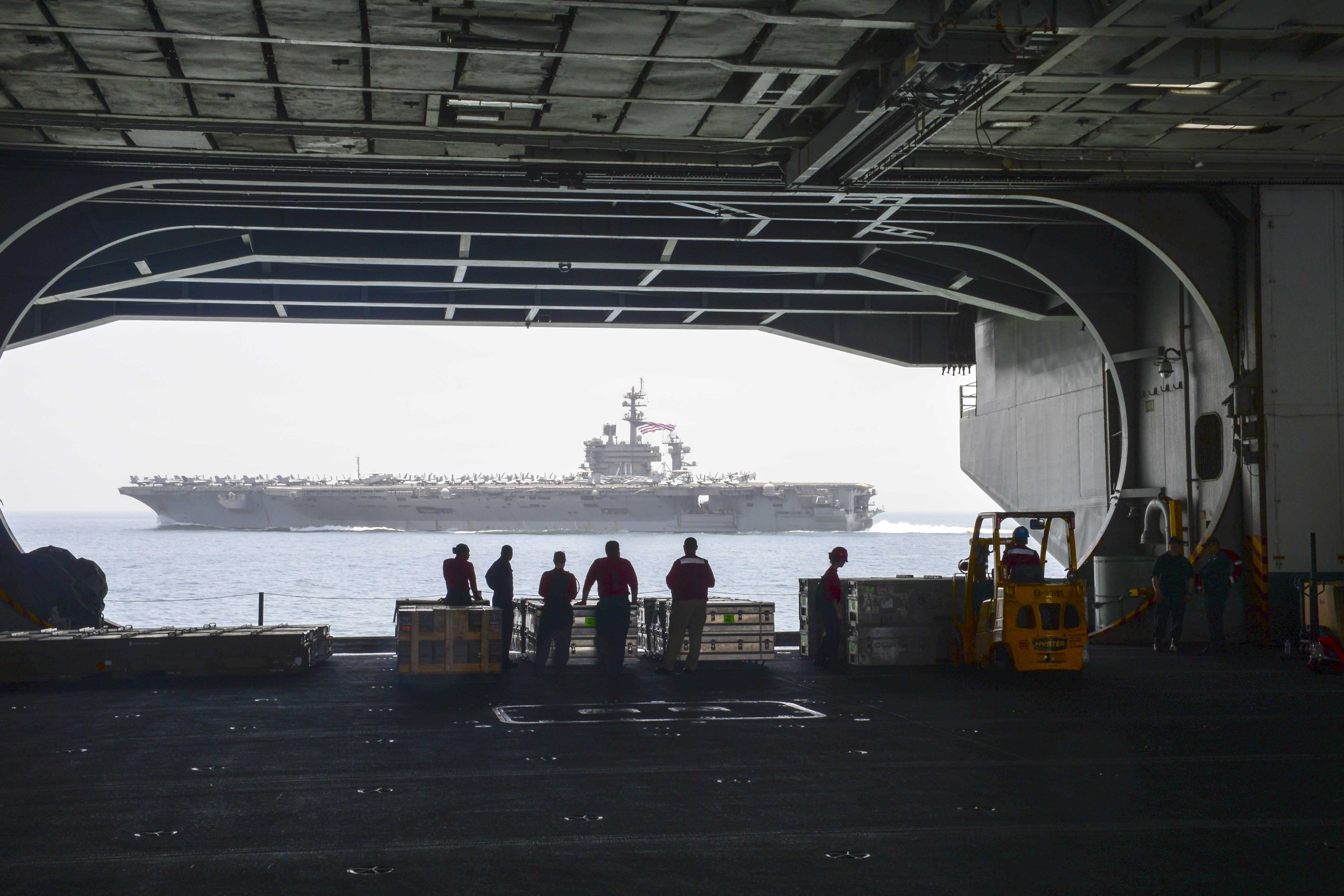
Gulf of Oman (13 April 2015)

The group came under the operational control of the U.S. Sixth Fleet on 16 March 2015. While en route, on 21 March 2015, the cruiser Normandy recovered more than 1,000 pounds of illegal narcotics after an MH-60 Seahawk from its squadron HSM-46 detachment spotted a small craft dumping large packages into the water (pictured). The strike group transited the Strait of Gibraltar and entered the Mediterranean Sea on 31 March 2015.

Carrier Strike Group Twelve shifted its operational control to the U.S. Fifth Fleet after transiting the Suez Canal on 6 April 2015. Carrier Strike Group Twelve entered the Persian Gulf on 14 April 2015 and, on 16 April 2015, began combat operations in support of Operation Inherent Resolve, the U.S.-led air campaign against ISIL in Iraq and Syria.

Both the destroyers Forrest Sherman and Winston Churchill conducted Maritime Interdiction Operations (MIO) in the Gulf of Aden and Bab-el-Mandeb Strait, with the Forrest Sherman rejoining the U.S. mine-hunting ships Sentry and Dextrous on 20 April 2015 after escorting the U.S. nuclear submarine Helena northbound through the Suez Canal. These warships were monitoring the deteriorating situation in war-torn Yemen. On 8 September 2015, Farragut rescued three mariners from their disabled fishing vessel in the Red Sea.

On 19 April 2015 Theodore Roosevelt and Normandy transited the Strait of Hormuz to join the ten other U.S. naval units operating in the Gulf of Aden. Theodore Roosevelt and Normandy were moved to monitor an Iranian naval convoy escorted by two Iranian warships suspected of carrying arms to the Houthi rebel forces in Yemen. The Roosevelt was operating within 200 nautical miles (370 km; 230 mi) of the Iranian convoy. The convoy later reversed course and returned home without incident. Theodore Roosevelt and Normandy returned to the Persian Gulf on 24 April 2015.

On 28 April 2015, Iranian Revolutionary Guard patrol craft intercepted and seized the Marshall Islands container cargo ship MV Maersk Tigris while it was transiting the Strait of Hormuz. It made a distress call. Since Maersk Tigris was a Marshalls' vessel, and the United States is responsible for the defense of the Marshalls, Farragut was dispatched. On 30 April 2015, U.S. warship began escorting U.S.-flagged merchant marine vessels through the Strait of Hormuz. On 7 May 2015, Maersk Tigris was released and the U.S. Navy ended its escort operations.

On 12 May 2015, an F/A-18F Super Hornet from squadron VFA-211 crashed in the Persian Gulf shortly after being launched from the carrier Theodore Roosevelt. Both crew members were returned to Theodore Roosevelt after ejecting safely from the aircraft.

On 9 October 2015, Carrier Strike Group 12 transited the Strait of Hormuz, completing its deployment with Operation Inherent Resolve. During this deployment, the strike group launched 1,812 combat air sorties and expended 1,085 precision-guided munitions. On 23 November 2015, the strike group's flagship, USS Theodore Roosevelt, arrived at its new homeport, NAS North Island in San Diego, California, completing its eight-and-a-half-month long world cruise.

2015 deployment force composition

Warships	Carrier Air Wing One squadrons embarked aboard USS Theodore Roosevelt (CVN-71)	
USS Normandy (CG-60)	Marine Fighter Attack Squadron 251 (VMFA-251): 10 F/A-18C(N)	Carrier Airborne Early Warning Squadron 123 (VAW-123): 4 E-2D
USS Farragut (DDG-99)	Strike Fighter Squadron 211 (VFA-211): 11 F/A-18F	Helicopter Maritime Strike Squadron 46 (HSM-46): MH-60R
USS Forrest Sherman (DDG-98)	Strike Fighter Squadron 136 (VFA-136): 12 F/A-18E	Helicopter Antisubmarine Squadron 11 (HS-11): 7 SH-60F/HH-60H
USS Winston S. Churchill (DDG-81)	Strike Fighter Squadron 11 (VFA-11): 11 F/A-18F	Fleet Logistics Support Squadron 40 (VRC-40), Det. 3: 2 C-2A NP
——	Electronic Attack Squadron 137 (VAQ-137): 5 EA-18G	——

2015 deployment combat operations, exercises, and port visits

Number	Regional Exercises				Port Visits		Notes
Number	Duration	U.S. Force	Bilateral/Multilateral Partner(s)	Operating Area	Location	Dates	Notes
1st:	——	Farragut	——	——	(Note: Lisbon, Portugal, between 21 and 25 March 2015; Palma de Mallorca, Spain, from 27 March to 1 April 2015; Manama, Bahrain, between 15 and 20 May 2015; Abu Dhabi starting 30 June 2015; Salalah, Oman, between 19 and 23 August 2015; Manama, Bahrain, in October 2015)	See note	
2nd:	——	Theodore Roosevelt, Winston Churchill	——	——	HMNB Portsmouth	22–26 Mar 2015	
3rd:	——	Forrest Sherman	——	——	(Note: La Spezia, Italy, between 24 and 28 March 2015; Vlore, Albania, from 31 March to 2 April 2015; Salalah, Oman, between 12 and 15 June 2015; and Taweelah, United Arab Emirates, on 27 July 2015; Eilat, Israel, from 15 to 18 September 2015)	See note	
4th:	——	Normandy	——	——	(Note: Corfu, Greece, between 25 and 28 March 2015; Koper, Slovenia, from 30 March to 1 April 2015; Dubai, United Arab Emirates, from 7 to 11 May 2015; Manama, Bahrain, from 19 to 23; Dubai, United Arab Emirates, from 4 to 8 October 2015.)	See note	
5th:	16 Apr to 9 October 2015	Carrier Strike Group 12 (Note: Theodore Roosevelt, Normandy,Farragut, Carrier Air Wing 1, HMS Duncan (D37), USS Paul Hamilton (DDG-60))	Operation Inherent Resolve: CJTF–OIR	Persian Gulf	Manama, Bahrain (Note: Theodore Roosevelt, Normandy, Carrier Air Wing 1)	4–8 May 2015	
6th:	15 October 2015	Winston S. Churchill	PASSEX: HS Nikiforos Fokas (F 466)	Mediterranean Sea	(Note: Salalah, Oman, from 26 to 28 May 2015; Manama, Bahrain, on 11 September 2015; Piraeus, Greece, from 16 to 20 October 2015.)	See note	
7th:	——	Theodore Roosevelt	——	——	(Note: Jebel Ali, United Arab Emirates, from 7 to 11 Jun 2015; Manama, Bahrain, between 31 August and 5 September 2015; Singapore from 24 to 28 October 2015)	See note	
8th:	12–22 Jun 2015	Carrier Strike Group 12	FLEETEX (Note: USS Farragut (DDG-99), USS McFaul (DDG-74), USS Paul Hamilton (DDG-60), USS Normandy (CG-60), and HMS Duncan (D37).)	Persian Gulf	Manama, Bahrain	19–23 Jul 2015	
9th:	16–19 Oct 2015	Carrier Strike Group 12	Malabar 2015: Indian Navy, JMSDF (Note: USS Fort Worth (LCS-3), USS City of Corpus Christi (SSN-705), INS Ravijay (D55); INS Shivalik (F47); INS Betwa (F39); INS Sindhuraj (S57); INS Shakti (A57); and JS Fuyuzuki(DD-118).)	Bay of Bengal	(Note: Dubai, United Arab Emirates, between 4 and 8 October 2015; Singapore between 24 and 28 October 2015)	See note	

=== 2019 deployment ===
On 1 April 2019, USS Abraham Lincoln and Carrier Strike Group 12 departed Norfolk for a six-month deployment. On 9 April Abraham Lincoln arrived in the United States Sixth Fleet area of operations, for operations in the Mediterranean Sea before proceeding to the Persian Gulf, then the Indian Ocean and the South China Sea, before heading across the Pacific Ocean to her new homeport at San Diego. On 5 May 2019 this deployment was diverted to the Middle East due to tensions with Iran.

Warships	Carrier Air Wing One squadrons embarked aboard USS Theodore Roosevelt (CVN-71)	
USS Leyte Gulf (CG-55)	Strike Fighter Squadron 25: F/A-18E	Airborne Early Warning Squadron 121: E-2D
USS Bainbridge (DDG-96)	Strike Fighter Squadron 86: F/A-18E	Helicopter Sea Combat Squadron 5: MH-60S
USS Gonzalez (DDG-66)	Strike Fighter Squadron 103: F/A-18F	Helicopter Maritime Strike Squadron 79: MH-60R
USS Mason (DDG-87)	Strike Fighter Squadron 143: F/A-18E	Fleet Logistics Support Squadron 40 Det. 3: C-2A
USS Nitze (DDG-94)	Electronic Attack Squadron 140: EA-18G	——
Méndez Núñez (F104)	——	——

=== 2023 deployment ===
On 2 May 2023, USS Gerald R. Ford (CVN-78) and Carrier Strike Group 12 departed Norfolk for a routine deployment. On 24 May, Rear Adm. Erik J. Eslich assumed command of CSG-12 aboard the USS Gerald R. Ford.

On 8 October 2023, the day after the October 7 attacks, the U.S. Secretary of Defense, Lloyd Austin, directed the Gerald R. Ford carrier strike group to the Eastern Mediterranean "to bolster regional deterrence efforts." In 20 January 2024, the USS Normandy returned from an extended deployment.

=== 2024-2026 ===
In November 2024, CSG-12 completed its first integrated at-sea “Group Sail” training in the Atlantic. In June 2025, they were deployed to the EUCOM area to conduct power projection and coordination with allies in the Mediterranean. In August–September they operated in the High North with NATO allies. They then crossed the Strait of Gibraltar on 4 November 2025 repositioning toward the U.S. Southern Command area for operations supporting counter-narco-terrorism and enhanced Caribbean presence. As of January 2026, they are still there, now off the coast of Venezuela and Puerto Rico.

In 2026, CSG-12 has been sent to the Middle East to support CSG-3 before the 2026 Iran war.

2026 deployment force composition

Warships	Carrier Air Wing Eight squadrons embarked aboard USS Gerald R. Ford (CVN-78)	
USS Mahan (DDG-72)	Strike Fighter Squadron 31: F/A-18E	Airborne Command and Control Squadron 124: E-2D
USS Bainbridge (DDG-96)	Strike Fighter Squadron 37: F/A-18E	Helicopter Sea Combat Squadron 9: MH-60S
USS Winston S. Churchill (DDG-81)	Strike Fighter Squadron 213: F/A-18F	Helicopter Maritime Strike Squadron 70: MH-60R
——	Strike Fighter Squadron 87: F/A-18E	Fleet Logistics Support Squadron 40: C-2A
——	Electronic Attack Squadron 142: EA-18G	——

== Strike group commanders ==
Commander Carrier Strike Group Twelve (COMCARSTRKGRU 12 or CCSG 12) is responsible for unit-level training, integrated training, and material readiness for the ships and aviation squadrons assigned to the group. When deployed overseas, the group comes under command of the numbered fleet (i.e., Third, Fourth, Fifth, Sixth, or Seventh) in whose area it is operating, and will have a task force or task group designator, for example, Task Group 50.1 in the Fifth Fleet area.

Group commanders since 2004 have included:

• Rear Admiral James W. Stevenson Jr.	(September 2004 – June 2005)
• Rear Admiral Raymond A. Spicer	(June 2005 – February 2007)
• Rear Admiral Daniel P. Holloway	(February 2007 – August 2008)
• Rear Admiral John N. Christenson	(August 2008 – October 2009)
• Rear Admiral David H. Buss	(October 2009 – September 2010)
• Rear Admiral Terry B. Kraft	(September 2010 – October 2011)
• Rear Admiral Walter E. Carter Jr.	(October 2011 – April 2013)
• Rear Admiral Kevin J. Kovacich	(April 2013 – April 2014)
• Rear Admiral Andrew L. Lewis	(July 2014 – July 2015)
• Rear Admiral Roy J. Kelley	(July 2015 – September 2016)
• Rear Admiral Kent D. Whalen	(September 2016 – May 2018)
• Rear Admiral John F. G. Wade	(May 2018 – June 2019)
• Rear Admiral Michael E. Boyle	(June 2019 – May 2020)
• Rear Admiral Craig A. Clapperton	(May 2020 – June 2021)
• Rear Admiral Gregory C. Huffman	(June 2021 – May 2023)
• Rear Admiral Erik J. Eslich	(May 2023 – May 2024)
• Rear Admiral Thomas P. Moninger	(May 2024 – March 2025)
• Rear Admiral Paul Lanzilotta	(March 2025 – April 2026)
• Rear Admiral Gavin Duff	(April 2026 – Present)
