= Bold Alligator =

American littoral warfare exercise

Bold Alligator is a multinational littoral warfare exercise hosted by the United States. It has been held annually since 2011. In 2012, it involved 14,000 marines, sailors, airmen and soldiers, encompassing more than 25 ships and involving eleven countries, with Canada, Mexico, UK, France, Netherlands, Spain, Italy, New Zealand, Australia, and other allied nations participating at sea, on land, and in the air, at Camp Lejeune, North Carolina and in Virginia.

In 2014 the exercise involved 19 countries:

- United Kingdom
- Canada
- United States
- Mexico
- Peru
- Brazil
- Chile
- Spain
- France
- Germany
- Belgium
- Italy
- Netherlands
- Denmark
- Sweden
- Turkey
- Japan
- Australia
- Norway

== Bold Alligator 2012 ==
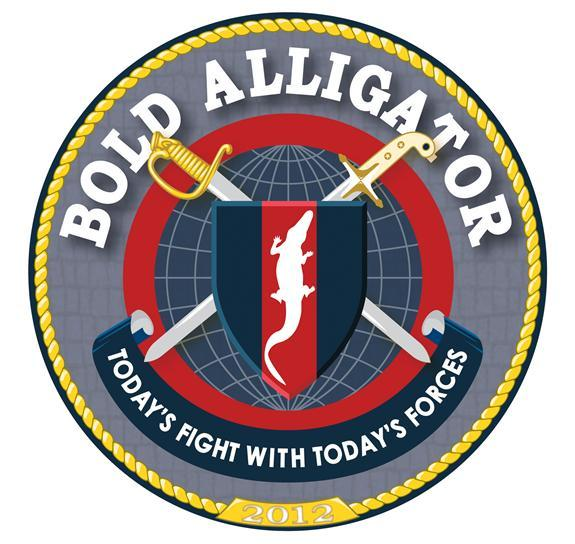
Bold Alligator 2012

Bold Alligator 2012 (BA12) was the second annual joint and multinational amphibious assault exercise sponsored by the U.S. Fleet Forces Command and the U.S. Marine Forces Command. Held from 30 January to 12 February 2012, Bold Alligator 2012 was the largest amphibious assault exercise held on the east coast of the United States since 2002. Its objective was the revitalization of U.S. Navy and U.S. Marine Corps amphibious expeditionary tactics, techniques, and procedures, as well as the reinvigoration of combined Navy and Marine Corps operations from the sea. This live and synthetic, scenario-driven, simulation-supported exercise focused on the six core capabilities set forth in the current U.S. maritime strategy - forward presence, deterrence, sea control, power projection, maritime security, and humanitarian assistance/disaster response.

Bold Alligator 2012 served as a key pre-deployment training exercises for Expeditionary Strike Group Two, the 2nd Marine Expeditionary Brigade, and Carrier Strike Group Twelve. Additionally, nine countries participated in this exercise, providing maritime, land, and air units or observers from Australia, Canada, France, Italy, Netherlands, New Zealand, Spain, and the United Kingdom. Bold Alligator 2012 was held ashore and afloat, in and off the coasts of Virginia, North Carolina, and Florida, and it culminated in three large-scale operations - an amphibious assault at Camp Lejeune; an aerial assault from the sea into Fort Pickett; and an amphibious raid on Joint Expeditionary Base East.

Bold Alligator 2012 served as the Joint Task Force Exercise for Carrier Strike Group Twelve, the final pre-deployment training exercises needed to receive its combat-readiness certification. During this month-long underway period, Carrier Air Wing completed 3,830 flight hours, made 2,052 arrested landings, and received a 96 percent sortie completion rate. This included a single-day total of 107 sorties flown on 6 February 2012 during the amphibious assault phase of Bold Alligator 2012.
