= HSC-11 =

Helicopter Sea Combat Squadron 11
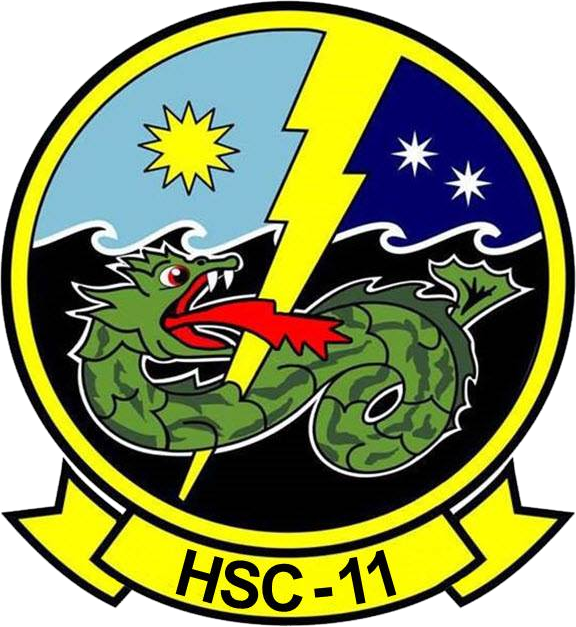
- HSC-11 insignia
- Active: 27 June 1957 – present
- Country: United States of America
- Branch: United States Navy
- Type: Helicopter Sea Combat Squadron
- Part of: Carrier Air Wing 1
- Garrison/HQ: Naval Air Station Norfolk
- Nickname(s): "Dragonslayers" or "Slayers"
- Engagements: Operation Prosperity Guardian; Operation Poseidon Archer

Commanders
- Current commander: Commander
- Notable commanders: Commander T. F. Kinsella, Jr.

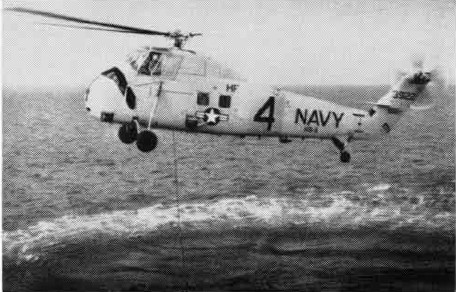
A HSS-1 Seabat of HS-11 dipping its sonar in 1958.

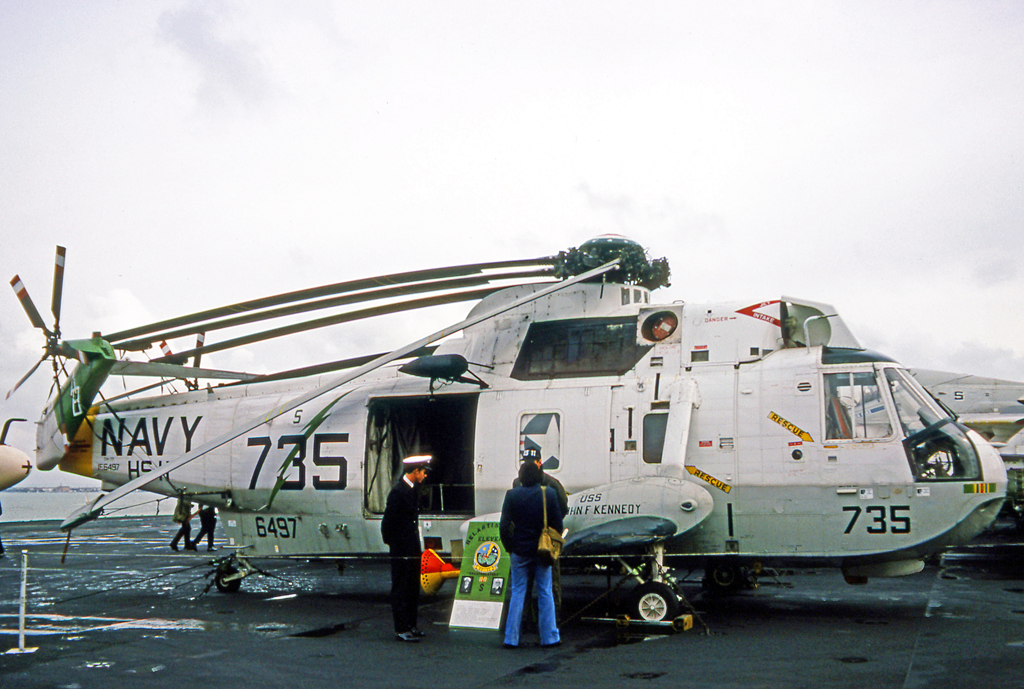
Sikorsky SH-3D Sea King of HS-11 serving aboard USS John F. Kennedy in 1976

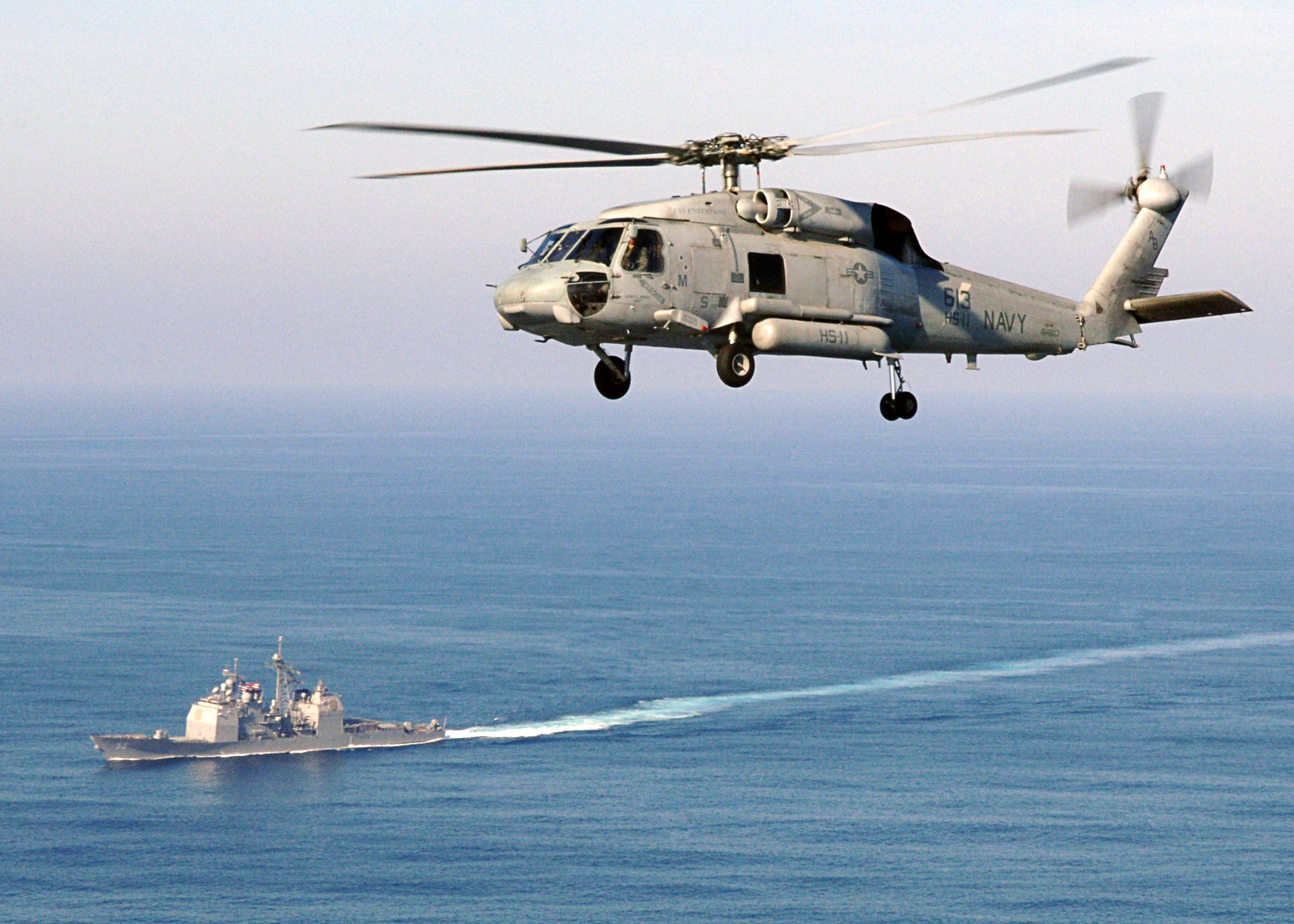
An HS-11 SH-60F passing USS Leyte Gulf in 2006.

Helicopter Sea Combat Squadron 11 (HSC-11), also known as the Dragonslayers, is a United States Navy helicopter squadron based at Naval Air Station Norfolk as part of Carrier Air Wing 1 operating MH-60S helicopters deployed aboard aircraft carriers. The squadron was established on 27 June 1957 at Naval Air Station Quonset Point as Helicopter Anti-Submarine Squadron 11 (HS-11) with Sikorsky HSS-1 Seabat helicopters. In 2016, HS-11 transitioned to MH-60S and re-designated as HSC-11.

== History ==
Helicopter Anti-Submarine Squadron 11 was established on 27 June 1957 at Naval Air Station (NAS) Quonset Point, Rhode Island. The squadron's nickname was the Sub Seekers and it first flew the Sikorsky HSS-1 Seabat helicopter under the radio call sign "Snowbound". The primary mission of the Seabat was antisubmarine warfare (ASW) and it carried dipping sonar. In 1959 the squadron transitioned to the HSS-1N Seabat which was upgraded with Doppler radar and automatic stabilization and hover capabilities for all-weather operations. The HS-11 Sub Seekers were assigned to Carrier Anti-Submarine Air Group 52 (CVSG-52) with tail code AS and deployed on board USS Wasp (CVS-18). In September 1962 the squadron's HSS-1N helicopters were re-designated the SH-34J Seabat in compliance with the 1962 United States Tri-Service aircraft designation system.

At the end of 1962, the squadron transitioned to the Sikorsky twin engine SH-3A Sea King and would later upgrade to the SH-3D and SH-3H in 1969 and 1980, respectively. In December 1969, HS-11 became the first ASW helicopter squadron to deploy as part of a modern carrier air wing with CVW-17 on board USS Forrestal (CVA-59). From 1970 to 1973, HS-11 was assigned to CVSG-56 deploying on board USS Intrepid (CVS-11) with tail code AU. On 17 October 1973, HS-11 moved to its new home port of Naval Air Station Jacksonville and was reassigned to Carrier Air Wing ONE (CVW-1) where it remains assigned to this day. In 1989, HS-11 changed its squadron nickname from Sub Seekers to Dragonslayers. HS-11 would make deployments on board USS John F. Kennedy (CV-67), USS America (CV-66), USS George Washington (CVN-73), USS Theodore Roosevelt (CVN-71), and aboard USS Enterprise (CVN-65) before Enterprise decommissioned late in 2012.

The Dragonslayer history has many distinguished highlights. The squadron played a leading role in astronaut recovery operations during the Gemini missions, plucking from the sea such famed astronauts as White, McDivitt, Lovell, and Aldrin. In 1976, the squadron was awarded the Navy Unit Commendation for saving countless lives after ship collisions at sea while attached to USS John F. Kennedy (CV-67). Over the years, HS-11 has answered the domestic call for help numerous times in support of hurricane relief efforts, including Hurricane Andrew in 1993 and in 1999 the squadron rescued nine men whose ship was sunk during Hurricane Floyd in winds over 50 knots and seas measuring 30 feet. HS-11 was the first Navy squadron on-station just hours after Hurricane Ike swept through Galveston, Texas, in September 2008. More recently, HS-11 was one of the first units to respond to the earthquake as part of Operation unified response in Haiti in January 2010.

Since 1985, HS-11 has participated in Operation Ocean Safari in the northern Atlantic, Operation Prairie Fire in Libya, Operations Desert Shield, Desert Storm and Southern Watch in the Persian Gulf, Operation Provide Promise in the Adriatic Sea, Operation Provide Comfort off Mogadishu, Somalia and Operations Deny Flight and Decisive Edge in the Adriatic Sea. HS-11 participated in Operation Enduring Freedom in Afghanistan and Operation Iraqi Freedom between 2001 and 2003, and again supported Operations Iraqi Freedom and Enduring Freedom in 2006 and 2007. In 2006, the Dragonslayers deployed two HH-60H aircraft to Basrah, Iraq, in support of Multi-National Division (South-East) and the Joint Helicopter Force.

In 1994, HS-11 transitioned to the Sikorsky SH-60F and HH-60H Seahawk helicopters. The capabilities of those aircraft allowed the squadron to greatly expand its mission areas. In addition to ASW and search and rescue, the Dragonslayers added such missions as Vertical Replenishment, Naval Special Warfare Support, and Combat Search and Rescue to its capabilities. With the addition of the Hellfire missile system and GAU-16 .50 caliber machine gun in 1999, HS-11 became capable of effectively conducting anti-surface warfare. In 2014, HS-11 became the first active duty fleet helicopter squadron to deploy with the GAU-17/A 7.62mm mini-gun system.

On 1 June 2016, HS-11 completed transition to the MH-60S Seahawk, was redesignated HSC-11, and moved from NAS Jacksonville to Naval Station Norfolk, Virginia.

In late September 2024, HS-11 and their MH-60S Seahawks departed the US as part of CVW-1 on a scheduled deployment aboard the USS Harry S. Truman (CVN-75)

Following multiple exercises with European militaries, HS-11 and CVW-1 were ordered to operate in the Red Sea in defense of international shipping lanes and Israel against Houthi/Iran proxy military unit attacks from Yemen. HS-11 and CVW-1 arrived in the CENTCOM AOR in mid December 2024 with combat operations against the Houthis/Iranians commencing upon arrival to the Red Sea.

Airstrikes were undertaken against the Houthis/Iranians for much of the later half of December 2024 through April 2025. Strikes against the Houthis/Iranian proxy military units in Yemen increased significantly following March 15, 2025, with HS-11 and CVW-1 conducting increased sorties on a larger set of enemy targets.

== See also ==
- List of United States Navy aircraft squadrons
