= Michael J. Novosel =

American military officer (1922–2006)

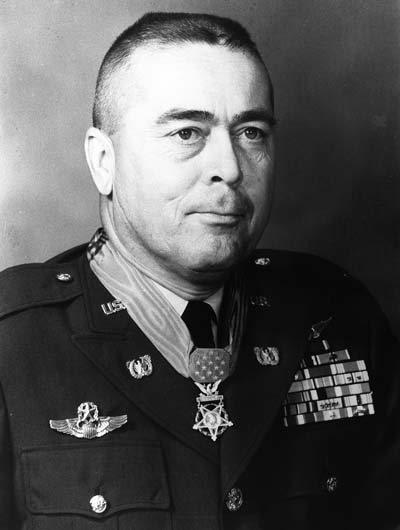
- Born: September 3, 1922; Etna, Pennsylvania, US
- Died: April 2, 2006 (aged 83); Washington, D.C., US
- Burial place: Arlington National Cemetery, Arlington, Virginia
- Relatives: Brian Clevinger, grandson
- Military career
- Allegiance: United States of America
- Branch: United States Army; United States Air Force
- Service years: 1941–1963 (USAF/USAFR); 1963–1984 (USA)
- Rank: Lieutenant colonel (USAFR); Chief warrant officer 4 (USA)
- Units: 283rd Medical Detachment; 82nd Medical Detachment
- Conflicts: World War II; Korean War; Vietnam War
- Awards: Medal of Honor; Army Distinguished Service Medal; Distinguished Flying Cross (3); Bronze Star (2); Purple Heart; Air Medal (64)

Michael J. Novosel Sr. (September 3, 1922 – April 2, 2006) of Enterprise, Alabama, served in the United States military during World War II, the Korean War, and the Vietnam War. He flew the B-29 Superfortress bomber in World War II. To serve in the Vietnam War, he gave up the rank of lieutenant colonel in the Air Force Reserve and became a chief warrant officer in the Army. He was awarded the Medal of Honor, the United States' highest military decoration, for his bravery in conducting a medical evacuation under fire in the Vietnam War.

In April 2023, Fort Rucker, Alabama, was renamed Fort Novosel in his honor.

== Biography ==
Novosel was born in Etna, Pennsylvania, the son of Croatian immigrants, and he grew up during the Great Depression. He joined the Army Air Corps at age 19, ten months before Pearl Harbor, and by 1945 he was a captain flying B-29 Superfortress bombers in the war against Japan. He briefly left the service as the military shrank after the war, and he settled in Fort Walton Beach, Florida, to raise his family.

During the Korean War, Novosel joined the Air Force Reserve and went back on active duty to serve his country. He left the service again in 1953 and was promoted to the rank of lieutenant colonel in the Air Force Reserve in 1955.

In 1963, Novosel was working as a commercial airline pilot when he decided to return to active military duty. By then, he was 41 and the Air Force did not have space for any more officers in the upper ranks. He decided to give up his rank of lieutenant colonel in the Air Force to join the Army and fly helicopters as a chief warrant officer (CW4) with the elite Special Forces Aviation Section. He served his first tour in Vietnam flying medevac helicopters (Dustoff) with the 283rd Medical Detachment. His second tour in Vietnam was with the 82nd Medical Detachment. During that war, Novosel flew 2,543 missions and extracted 5,589 wounded personnel, among them his own son Michael J. Novosel Jr. The following week, Michael Jr. returned the favor by extracting his father after he was shot down.

On the morning of October 2, 1969, Novosel set out to evacuate a group of South Vietnamese soldiers who were surrounded by several thousand North Vietnamese light infantry near the Cambodian border. Radio communication was lost and the soldiers had expended their ammunition. Without air cover or fire support, Novosel flew at low altitude under continuous enemy fire. He skimmed the ground with his helicopter while his medic and crew chief pulled the wounded men on board. He completed 15 hazardous extractions, was wounded in a barrage of enemy fire, and momentarily lost control of his helicopter, but when it was over, he had rescued 29 men. He completed his tour in March 1970.

Novosel retired as the senior warrant officer with the Warrant Officer Candidate Program in 1984. He had been a military aviator for 42 years and was the last World War II military aviator in the U.S. to remain on active flying duty. He accumulated 12,400 military flying hours, including 2,038 in combat. He remained active in the military community while residing in Enterprise, Alabama, during his retirement, and he was frequently invited as an honored guest for military lectures and ceremonies throughout the nation. He co-piloted the liftoff of the Bell UH-1 Iroquois for the In the Shadow of the Blade mission in 2002. His book Dustoff – The Memoir of an Army Aviator was published in 1999.

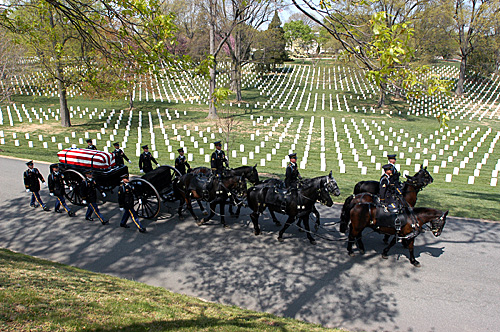
Soldiers from the 3rd Infantry Regiment transporting Novosel's casket during his funeral procession at Arlington National Cemetery.

Novosel was diagnosed with a recurrent cancer in November 2005, and he underwent a series of treatments at Walter Reed Army Medical Center in Washington, D.C. The cancer tumor was greatly reduced in December 2005 and January 2006. In February, he concluded chemotherapy and other treatments and waited to regain strength in preparation for surgery on March 7. His prognosis appeared excellent, yet he never fully recovered from the shock of the surgery. He died on April 2, 2006, and was buried at Arlington National Cemetery, in Arlington, Virginia.

== Honors ==
In 1971, President Richard Nixon presented to Novosel the Medal of Honor, the nation's highest award for valor in combat. His many other awards included the Distinguished Service Cross (which was later upgraded to the MOH), Distinguished Service Medal, Distinguished Flying Cross with two Oak Leaf Clusters, Bronze Star with Oak Leaf Cluster, and the Purple Heart. He was inducted into the Army Aviation Hall of Fame in 1975. Upon his retirement, he received a rare honor for a living hero when the main street at Fort Rucker, Alabama, was renamed "Novosel Street". He also received the Distinguished Service Medal during his retiring ceremony.

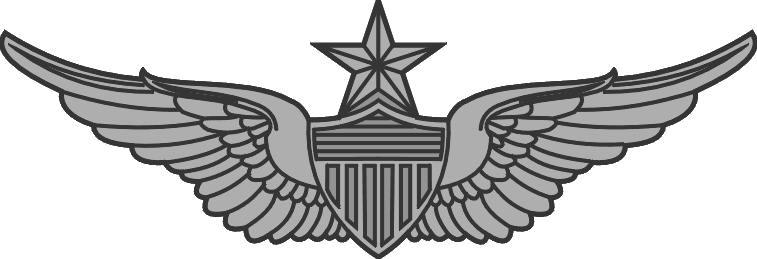

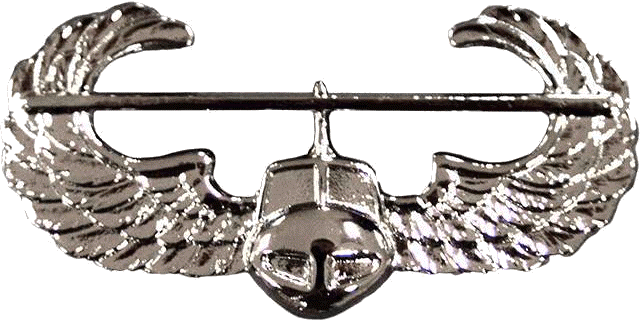

Army Senior Aviator Badge
Air Force Command Pilot Badge
Air Assault Badge
Medal of Honor		Army Distinguished Service Medal
Distinguished Flying Cross with two bronze oak leaf clusters	Bronze Star Medal with bronze oak leaf clusters	Purple Heart
Air Medal with Award numeral 64	Army Commendation Medal	Army Good Conduct Medal
American Defense Service Medal	American Campaign Medal	Asiatic-Pacific Campaign Medal with two bronze campaign stars
World War II Victory Medal	Army of Occupation Medal with 'Japan' clasp	National Defense Service Medal with service star
Armed Forces Expeditionary Medal	Vietnam Service Medal with four bronze campaign stars	Air Force Longevity Service Award with two bronze oak leaf clusters
Army Service Ribbon	Armed Forces Reserve Medal with bronze hourglass device	Philippine Independence Medal
Vietnam Gallantry Cross with gold star	Vietnam Armed Forces Honor Medal; 1st class	Republic of Vietnam Campaign Medal

In May 2022, the Naming Commission, created by Congress, recommended that Fort Rucker be renamed Fort Novosel. The renaming ceremony and presentation of a new monument took place on April 10, 2023.

=== Medal of Honor citation ===
Rank and organization: Chief Warrant Officer, U.S. Army, 82d Medical Detachment, 45th Medical Company, 68th Medical Group.

Place and date: Kien Tuong Province, Republic of Vietnam, October 2, 1969. Entered service at: Kenner, La. Born: September 3, 1922, Etna, Pa.

Citation:

For conspicuous gallantry and intrepidity in action at the risk of his life above and beyond the call of duty. CWO Novosel, 82d Medical Detachment, distinguished himself while serving as commander of a medical evacuation helicopter. He unhesitatingly maneuvered his helicopter into a heavily fortified and defended enemy training area where a group of wounded Vietnamese soldiers were pinned down by a large enemy force. Flying without gunship or other cover and exposed to intense machinegun fire, CWO Novosel was able to locate and rescue a wounded soldier. Since all communications with the beleaguered troops had been lost, he repeatedly circled the battle area, flying at low level under continuous heavy fire, to attract the attention of the scattered friendly troops. This display of courage visibly raised their morale, as they recognized this as a signal to assemble for evacuation. On 6 occasions he and his crew were forced out of the battle area by the intense enemy fire, only to circle and return from another direction to land and extract additional troops. Near the end of the mission, a wounded soldier was spotted close to an enemy bunker. Fully realizing that he would attract a hail of enemy fire, CWO Novosel nevertheless attempted the extraction by hovering the helicopter backward. As the man was pulled on aboard, enemy automatic weapons opened fire at close range, damaged the aircraft and wounded CWO Novosel. He momentarily lost control of the aircraft, but quickly recovered and departed under the withering enemy fire. In all, 15 extremely hazardous extractions were performed in order to remove wounded personnel. As a direct result of his selfless conduct, the lives of 29 soldiers were saved. The extraordinary heroism displayed by CWO Novosel was an inspiration to his comrades in arms and reflect great credit on him, his unit, and the U.S. Army.

== See also ==
- List of Medal of Honor recipients for the Vietnam War
