= USS Tutuila (ARG-4) =

Luzon-class combustion engine repair ship in the US Navy

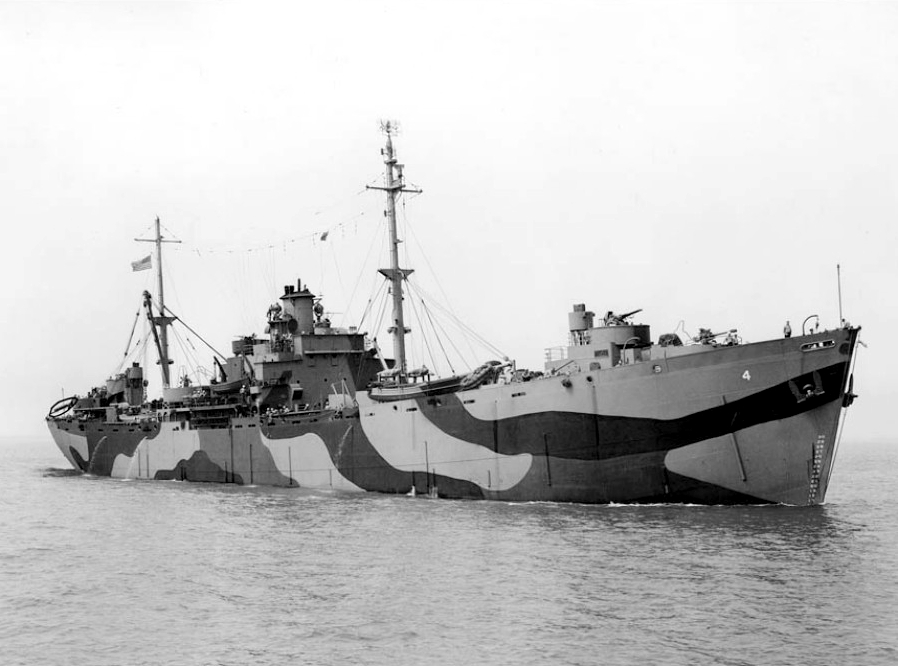
- USS Tutuila (ARG-4) underway near Norfolk Navy Yard, 18 May 1944.

History

United States
- Name: Arthur P. Gorman; Tutuila
- Namesake: Arthur P. Gorman; Tutuila
- Ordered: as a Type EC2-S-C1 hull, MCE hull 983
- Builder: Bethlehem-Fairfield Shipyard, Baltimore, Maryland
- Yard number: 2133
- Laid down: 11 August 1943
- Launched: 12 September 1943
- Acquired: 18 September 1943
- Commissioned: 8 April 1944
- Decommissioned: 7 December 1946
- Fate: laid up, Atlantic Reserve Fleet, Orange, Texas, 7 December 1946
- Recommissioned: 7 May 1951
- Decommissioned: 21 February 1972
- Stricken: 21 February 1972
- Identification: Hull symbol: ARG-4
- Motto: "Eternal vigilance is the price of freedom"
- Honors and awards: 7 Battle stars, 3 Navy Unit Commendations, 2 Meritorious Unit Commendations (Vietnam War)
- Fate: transferred to the Republic of China, 21 February 1972

Taiwan
- Name: Pien Tai (ARG 516)
- Acquired: 21 February 1972
- Commissioned: 21 February 1972
- Status: fate unknown

General characteristics
- Class & type: Luzon-class Internal Combustion Engine Repair Ship
- Type: Type EC2-S-C1
- Displacement: 4,023 long tons (4,088 t) (light load); 14,350 long tons (14,580 t) (full load)
- Length: 441 ft 6 in (134.57 m)
- Beam: 56 ft 11 in (17.35 m)
- Draft: 23 ft (7.0 m)
- Installed power: 2 × Babcock & Wilcox header-type boilers, 220 psi (1,500 kPa) 450 °F (232 °C); 2,500 shp (1,900 kW)
- Propulsion: 1 × General Machine Corporation vertical triple expansion engines; 1 x propeller
- Speed: 12.5 kn (23.2 km/h; 14.4 mph) (ship's trials)
- Complement: 31 officers, 552 enlisted
- Armament: 1 × 5 in (127 mm)/38 caliber dual purpose (DP) gun; 1 × 3 in (76 mm)/50 caliber (DP) gun; 2 × twin 40 mm (1.6 in) Bofors anti-aircraft (AA) gun mounts; 12 × single 20 mm (0.8 in) Oerlikon cannons AA mounts

USS Tutuila (ARG-4) was a Luzon-class internal combustion engine repair ship that saw service in the United States Navy during World War II, The Korean War, and The Vietnam War as well as several smaller actions. Named for the Island of Tutuila, the largest and main island of American Samoa, it was the second US Naval vessel to bear the name. After serving for nearly 30 years Tutuila was sold to the Republic of China in 1972.

== Construction ==
Tutuila was laid down 11 August 1943, as the liberty ship SS Arthur P. Gorman, under a Maritime Commission (MARCOM) contract, MCE hull 1179, by the Bethlehem-Fairfield Shipyard, Inc., in Baltimore, Maryland; launched 12 September 1943; transferred to the Navy when 80 percent complete for conversion to an internal combustion engine repair ship on 18 September; converted by the Maryland Drydock Co.; and commissioned there on 8 April 1944.

== Service history ==
=== World War II ===
Tutuila underwent shakedown in Hampton Roads from 20 April to 24 May, before sailing for the Panama Canal and proceeding via San Diego, Pearl Harbor, and Eniwetok to the South Pacific Theater.

Early in August, the repair ship joined Service Squadron (ServRon) 10, based at Purvis Bay, in the once hotly contested Solomon Islands. Tutuila served the Fleet as a floating advance base as it swept its way across the Pacific toward Japan. For the final year of the war, the repair ship engaged in round-the-clock work schedules which seldom slackened.

Tutuila aided in the buildup for the operations which led to the liberation of the Philippines from the Japanese occupation. Upon completion of this campaign, American task forces set their sights on islands closer to the Japanese homeland. Iwo Jima and Okinawa fell to the telling power of American shells, bombs, and troops which stormed ashore supported by a great Allied armada. Soon, the Allied navies were within shelling distance of the Japanese home islands themselves.

During this time, the repair ship operated first out of Manus, in the Admiralty Islands, before moving to Ulithi in the Caroline Islands. In the wake of the liberation of the Philippines, Tutuila arrived at Leyte on 24 May 1945, and provided repair services there to a wide variety of ships and smaller craft from the date of her arrival until the end of hostilities.

=== Postwar period ===
After the war, Tutuila's work was far from over. As American and Allied forces prepared for occupation of the Japanese homeland, the ship joined those forces headed north for duty off Japan's shores. On 30 August, Tutuila—in company with Jason, Whitney, and 11 smaller ships—set out on the first leg of the voyage northward. One day out, a typhoon Helen lashed at the convoy, forcing the slower repair ship to remain with the "small boys" while Jason and Whitney received orders to run for Japan. On 2 September, having weathered the storm and shepherded her charges to safe harbor, Tutuila dropped anchor in Buckner Bay, Okinawa.

From there, Tutuila proceeded with a 33-ship convoy, bound for Korea, making port at Jinsen, (Incheon) on 24 September 1945. She operated there as a maintenance vessel for ships engaged in the repatriation of Japanese prisoners of war. She continued this work after moving to Taku, China, where she arrived on 26 January 1946.

Departing Taku on 30 March, the ship steamed to Shanghai, China, where she dropped anchor on 2 April. Six days later, she sailed for the United States. The ship transited the Panama Canal and arrived at New Orleans, Louisiana, on 20 May. Following repairs, she moved to Galveston, Texas, on 9 June 1946, for deactivation and was decommissioned there six months later, on 7 December 1946.

=== 1950–1962 ===
Tutuila was laid up in the Atlantic Reserve Fleet in Texas, until the summer of 1950, when North Korean troops crossed the 38th parallel and invaded South Korea. As the United States armed forces mobilized to support the United Nations effort, Tutuila received the call to return to active service. Towed to Orange, Texas, she was reconditioned with new shop machinery which replaced her 5-inch (127 mm)/38 caliber gun and 40-millimetre (1.6 in) Bofors guns and their magazines. On 7 May 1951, the ship was recommissioned and assigned to the Service Force, Atlantic Fleet.

Tutuila arrived at Norfolk, on 30 May 1951, and served there until 13 October, when she proceeded to Baltimore, for one week before returning to Hampton Roads, where she remained from 23 October 1951 to 16 June 1952.

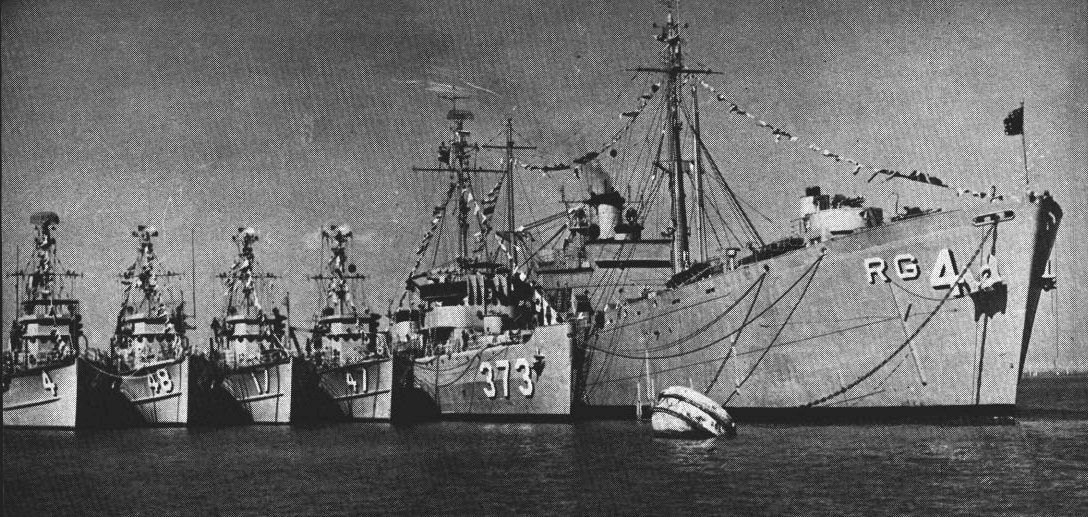
Tutuila with minesweepers, 1959.

Calling briefly at Guantánamo Bay, from 20 to 23 June, she operated out of Norfolk again from 28 June to 15 August, and from 22 August to 30 October, with a stint at New York City, in between. She continued this routine of east coast operations from 1952 through 1957, with occasional calls at Port-au-Prince, Haiti; Havana, Cuba; and Guantánamo Bay.

In 1957, the ship paid good will calls to Bermuda, in June, and Nova Scotia, in August, with groups of Explorer Scouts embarked for each cruise. In October 1958, Tutuila again visited Havana, and then proceeded to Philadelphia, where she took part in a special project for reclaiming materiel from ships in reserve before returning to Norfolk. She underwent a major overhaul at the Norfolk Navy Yard from 31 October 1958 to 21 January 1959, before proceeding to Guantanamo Bay, late in March. But for a round-trip cruise to Port-au-Prince, from 10 to 12 April, the ship served there until summer when she returned to the Virginia capes for antisubmarine exercises. The ship continued her operations out of Norfolk until the autumn of 1962.

On one occasion, the repair ship encountered merchantman SS William Johnson in distress while en route to Norfolk and, within a short time, Tutuila sent over a repair crew to correct the engineering casualty.

==== Cuban Missile Crisis and Dominican Intervention ====
American reconnaissance planes flying over Cuba in the fall of 1962, noticed unusual activities there; and, when photographic prints were developed, the unusual items and activities were found to be Russian-built missiles and missile sites. In reaction to this threat, President John F. Kennedy ordered the Navy to throw a cordon around Cuba—instituting a "quarantine" of the island. In this tense climate, Navy destroyers and patrol planes formed a picket line, turning back Russian ships carrying missiles.

Tutuila proceeded to Morehead City, North Carolina, where she rendered services to Amphibious Squadron 6 before stopping at Norfolk to load cargo and proceed south to support the quarantine line. Basing out of Roosevelt Roads Naval Station and Vieques, Puerto Rico, the ship provided supplies and services for the ships engaged in blockading Cuban sea lanes.

After the Soviet Government complied with President Kennedy's demand for the withdrawal of the missiles and all of their associated technicians, sites, and the like, tensions eased. Tutuila proceeded north toward Norfolk but encountered a storm—much like the one weathered in 1945, with 80-knot winds and heavy seas —which caused a three-day delay in her returning to home port.

=== 1963–1966 ===
Operating out of Norfolk and Charleston, South Carolina, through 1964, the ship provided repair services during Operation "Springboard" in January 1965. Visits to San Juan, Puerto Rico, and Roosevelt Roads, Puerto Rico; Frederik-sted and St. Croix, in the American Virgin Islands; and Fort Lauderdale, Florida; provided the crew with sightseeing and recreational activities in between her regular duties out of the east coast ports of Norfolk and Charleston. In March 1965, Tutuila participated in a program to reclaim materiel and special equipment installed on radar picket destroyers which were currently being decommissioned at Bayonne, NJ.

As flagship of ServRon 4, Tutuila returned to Norfolk before heading south to the strife-torn Dominican Republic. While performing repair and support duties during the months of April and May, the ship conducted a special series of operations geared toward supplying needed petroleum products to light and power facilities in Santo Domingo, Dominican Republic, after rebel gunfire had prevented normal tanker deliveries.

For the remainder of the year 1965, she continued operations out of Norfolk following the Dominican intervention, calling at San Juan and Guantanamo Bay for refresher training after her annual Portsmouth overhaul. During March and April 1966, Tutuila underwent extensive preparation for overseas deployment, as repair shops, berthing and messing spaces were air-conditioned, and new communications equipment was procured and installed.

=== Vietnam War ===
The repair ship sailed from Norfolk on 9 May 1966, and transited the Panama Canal on 18 May. After brief stops at Pearl Harbor and at Subic Bay in the Philippines, the repair ship arrived at An Thoi, Phu Quoc Island, in the Gulf of Siam, to support Operation Market Time off the coast of South Vietnam.

Relieving USS Krishna on 19 July, Tutuila commenced servicing the nimble and hard-hitting PCFs, or "Swift" boats, attached to Division 11. WPBs of the Coast Guard's Division 11 were based on Tutuila as well. The following month found Tutuila's LCMs and their crews participating in Operation Sea-mount, an Army-directed landing operation to clear the southern Phu Quoc Island of enemy forces. Landing Army of the Republic of Vietnam troops at four locations, Tutuila's boats also carried supplies and ammunition to the Allied ground forces while helicopters evacuated casualties to the repair ship for medical attention.

Krishna returned to An Thoi on 8 October, to relieve Tutuila, which then steamed to Bangkok, Thailand, for rest and relaxation for her crew. The repair ship then arrived back off the Vietnamese coast, reaching Vung Tau, off Cape St. Jacques, on 18 October. Here she supported Operations Market Time, Game Warden, and Stable Door through the end of 1966.

The opening days of the new year, 1967, saw the repair ship taking up support duties for the Mobile Riverine Force established at Vung Tau for operations in the Mekong Delta. Here, she assisted in the preparation of Assault Support Patrol Boats and other small patrol craft until USS Askari arrived and took over the major repair and maintenance work.

Tutuila's repair crews finished another difficult job in just five days— the overhauling and repairing of the troublesome diesel generators of USS Benewah.

Turned over to the operational control of Commander, Naval Support Activity Saigon, in April 1967, the ship commenced services to LSTs engaged in operations off the mouth of the Mekong River. During this period, the repair ship continued to provide support and maintenance facilities for craft of the Mobile Riverine Assault Force and supported Coastal Division 13 as well. Further, Tutuila's 3-inch (76 mm)/50 caliber guns spoke in anger for the first time in the Vietnam War, as the ship undertook a shore bombardment in the Rung Sat Special Zone, providing harassment and interdiction fire into an area of suspected Viet Cong activity north of Vung Tau.

Returning to An Thoi in October 1967, Tutuila relieved Krishna and provided support for coastal divisions of Navy and Coast Guard before proceeding to Kaohsiung, Taiwan, for five days of upkeep in late November. She returned to Vung Tau on 7 December, to continue supporting coastal interdiction operations.

The repair ship remained at Vung Tau, until taking over duties at An Thoi, in April 1968, from Krishna. While remaining on station through the summer, Tutuila also trained South Vietnamese sailors in the operation of PCFs, four of which had been transferred to South Vietnam in August. Tutuila's hard work earned the Navy Unit Commendation as a result of the labors conducted at both Vung Tau and An Thoi.

Extensive improvements in habitability highlighted the yard work conducted at Yokosuka in January 1969, while the main engine, auxiliary pumps, and the three main generators were all subjected to thorough overhauling. On 21 March, the ship departed from Yokosuka for sea trials and refresher training—a virtually new ship both inside and out. The final week of training completed by 22 April, Tutuila cleared the Japanese isles on 27 April; bound, once more, for Vietnam.

After a five-day visit to Hong Kong en route, the ship dropped anchor at Vung Tau on 14 May. She commenced work almost immediately, conducting a temporary availability on USS Brule before 1 June, and filling 36 work requests from USS Mark as well as repair work and availability requirements for local YFR craft and the Republic of Korea Girin (LSM 610).

On 12 June, Tutuila got underway for An Thoi, where she supported the continuation of Market Time, as well as "Seafloat" and Sealords, while maintaining PCFs, YFUs, APL-21, and several LSTs.

For the months of June and July, the ship also undertook further training operations—repairing 17 Vietnamese Navy PCFs and training 39 Vietnamese sailors in diesel engine overhaul. USS St. Francis River underwent two weeks of restricted availability, adding to the repair ship's already busy and round-the-clock schedule. Fulfilling these and other requests for South Vietnamese, Korean, Thai and United States Navy units, Tutuila remained busy for the remainder of her active career off Vietnam—receiving three Navy Unit Commendations in the process. Late in 1971, she was selected for transfer to the Republic of China Navy.

On New Year's Day 1972, Tutuila departed Vung Tau after six years of combat support duties. Many times she had hoisted PCFs or other patrol craft onto pontoons alongside for complete overhauls; her crew had taught their Vietnamese counterparts the intricacies of diesel power plants and generators. Her guns had even conducted one offensive shore bombardment. Vietnam lay behind her as she headed for Hong Kong on 1 January 1972. Six days of bad weather jostled her before she finally made port at the British Crown Colony on 7 January.

== Decommissioning and sale ==
Her stay at Hong Kong was not all rest and relaxation, however, as much lay ahead to be done in preparation for the transfer to the Nationalist Chinese Navy. Tutuila's crew gave her a "face lift" which included painting; overhauling engines; and getting her records and accounts in order. She departed Hong Kong on 13 January, and arrived at Subic Bay two days later, where, upon arrival, the work of off-loading supplies and ammunition began.

Departing Subic Bay on 29 January 1972, Tutuila made port at Kaohsiung on 2 February, to the accompaniment of a Chinese military band which played tunes from the dockside. For the next three weeks, final checks were undertaken to put the finishing touches on the transfer. Finally, by 21 February 1972, all was in readiness. On that day, Tutuila was decommissioned and struck from the Navy list. Transferred to the Nationalist Chinese Navy, she was renamed ROCS Pien Tai (ARG-516) and served as a supply ship into 1979.

== Bibliography ==
=== Online resources ===
- "Tutuila II (ARG-4)". Dictionary of American Naval Fighting Ships. Naval History and Heritage Command. 19 October 2015. This article incorporates text from this source, which is in the public domain.
- "Bethlehem-Fairfield, Baltimore MD". www.ShipbuildingHistory.com. 14 August 2008.
- "USS Tutuila (ARG-4)". NavSource. 8 January 2016.
