= Operation Game Warden =

Part of the Vietnam War (1965–1973)

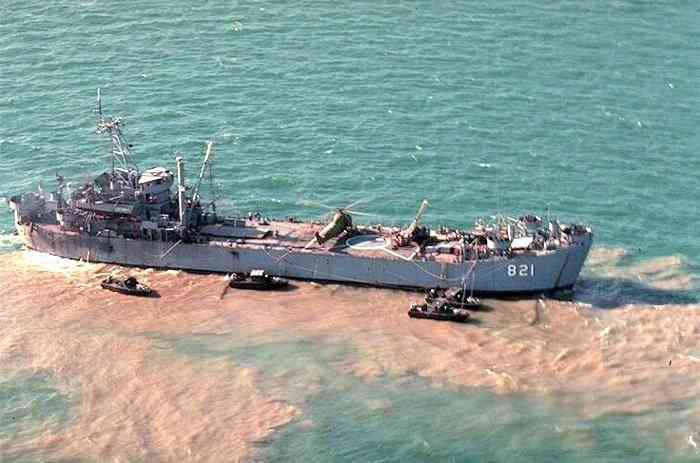
- USS Harnett County (AGP-821) part of Task Force 116
Date	18 December 1965 – March 1973
Location	Mekong Delta, South Vietnam
Result	American/South Vietnamese operational success; South Vietnam's extensive inland waterways secured; Viet Cong redirected their watercraft to smaller rivers and canals

Belligerents
United States; South Vietnam	Viet Cong

Commanders and leaders
(United States) William Westmoreland (United States) David L. McDonald	

Casualties and losses
(United States) 100 to 200 killed	(Viet Cong) 1,400+ killed captured and 2,000 watercraft destroyed

Operation Game Warden was a joint operation conducted by the United States Navy and South Vietnamese Navy in order to deny Viet Cong access to resources in the Mekong River Delta. Game Warden and its counterpart Operation Market Time are considered to be two of the most successful U.S. Naval actions during the Vietnam War.

== Geography and area of operations ==
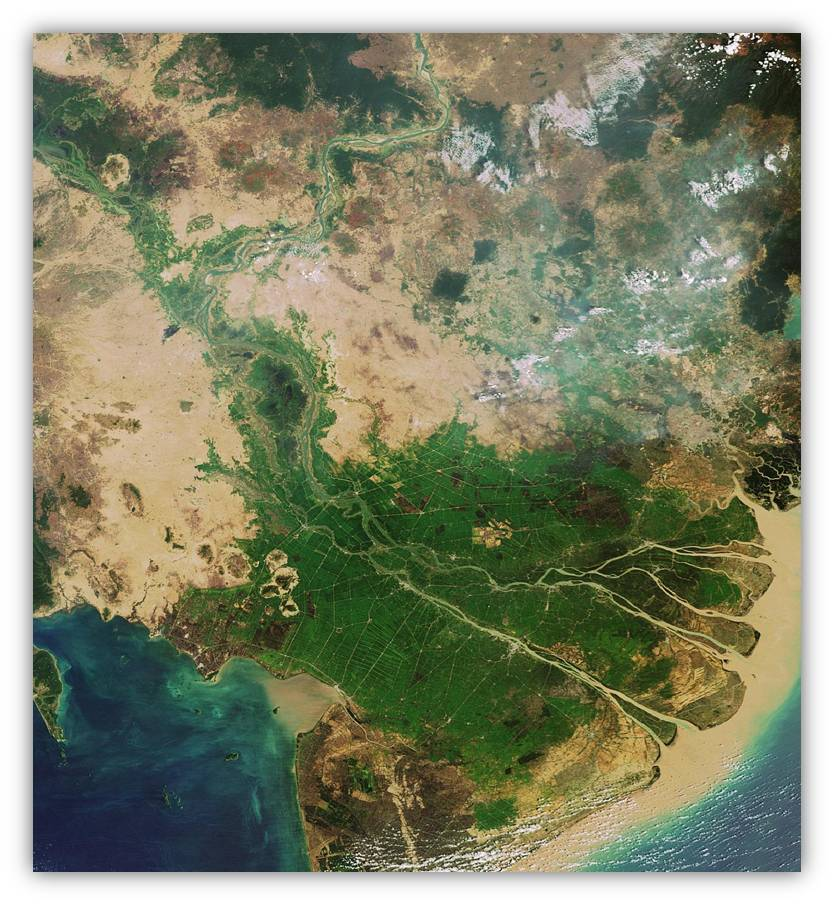
Aerial view of the Mekong River Delta

The Mekong Delta extends south and west from the city of Saigon and covers over 15,000 square miles (40,000 square kilometers). During the Vietnam War the strategic importance of the Delta was undeniable as it housed almost 8 million civilians and land movement was extremely restricted a majority of the year during the wet season. The Delta contained just one hard surface road connecting Saigon to Cà Mau while most other roads were completely unusable due to damage from the war or flooding, therefore conventional wheeled or tracked vehicles were not reliable. Water travel quickly became the primary means of travel, transportation, and communication for both the allies and Viet Cong (VC). The Mekong Delta provided the VC with the ability to move virtually undetected as over 50,000 junks operated in the region. Numerous communist strong holds located in the Mekong Delta often went unchallenged and allowed for easy movement between the bases, especially at night. Viet Cong base areas in the region included installations in the Rung Sat Special Zone, Coconut Grove in Gò Công Province, Cam Son Secret Zone near Mỹ Tho, U Minh Forest on the western coast, and the Seven Mountains region on the Cambodian border. The VC utilized approximately 1,400 miles (2,300 km) of natural waterways in the Delta, complemented by an additional 2,400 miles (3,900 km) of man-made canals.

== Development ==
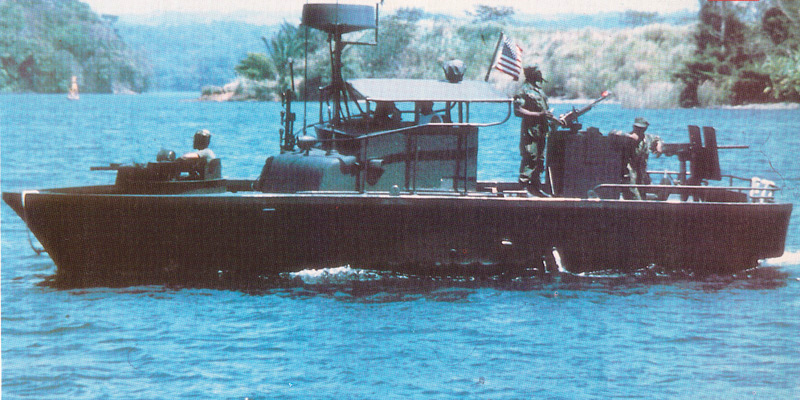
PBR on patrol in Vietnam with its front facing twin, and rear facing single .50-caliber machine guns, and mid-ship 40 mm grenade launcher clearly visible

In response to the deficiencies of the Republic of Vietnam Navy (RVNN), on 18 December 1965 the U.S. Navy established Operation Game Warden and placed Task Force 116 in command. Task Force 116, consisted of five divisions patrolling different sections of the Mekong Delta. The operation was originally placed under the command of Rear Admiral Norvell G. Ward, however command was later given to Captain Burton B. Witham Jr. on 18 May 1966. Task Force 116 began as a small fleet of 31-foot river patrol boats (PBRs), each crewed by a complement of four and equipped with radars, radios, two 50-caliber machine gun forward, a 50-caliber machine gun aft, a 7.62mm machine gun and a rapid fire 40 mm grenade launcher, but expanded to include landing ships tanks (LSTs), mine sweeping boats (MSBs), large personnel landing crafts (LCPLs), landing ship docks (LSDs), and helicopters. At its height in October 1968, Task Force 116 had a total of 2,032 personnel, 250 PBRs, 7 MSBs, and 31 other assorted craft led by Underwater Demolition Teams and SEALs. The Navy established a training facility specifically for river patrol personnel in Coronado, California called the Amphibious Training Center. However, the training soon moved to the Naval Inshore Operations Training Center on Mare Island after the Navy recognized the similarities between the sloughs of the Sacramento River and those of the Mekong River Delta.

== Objectives ==
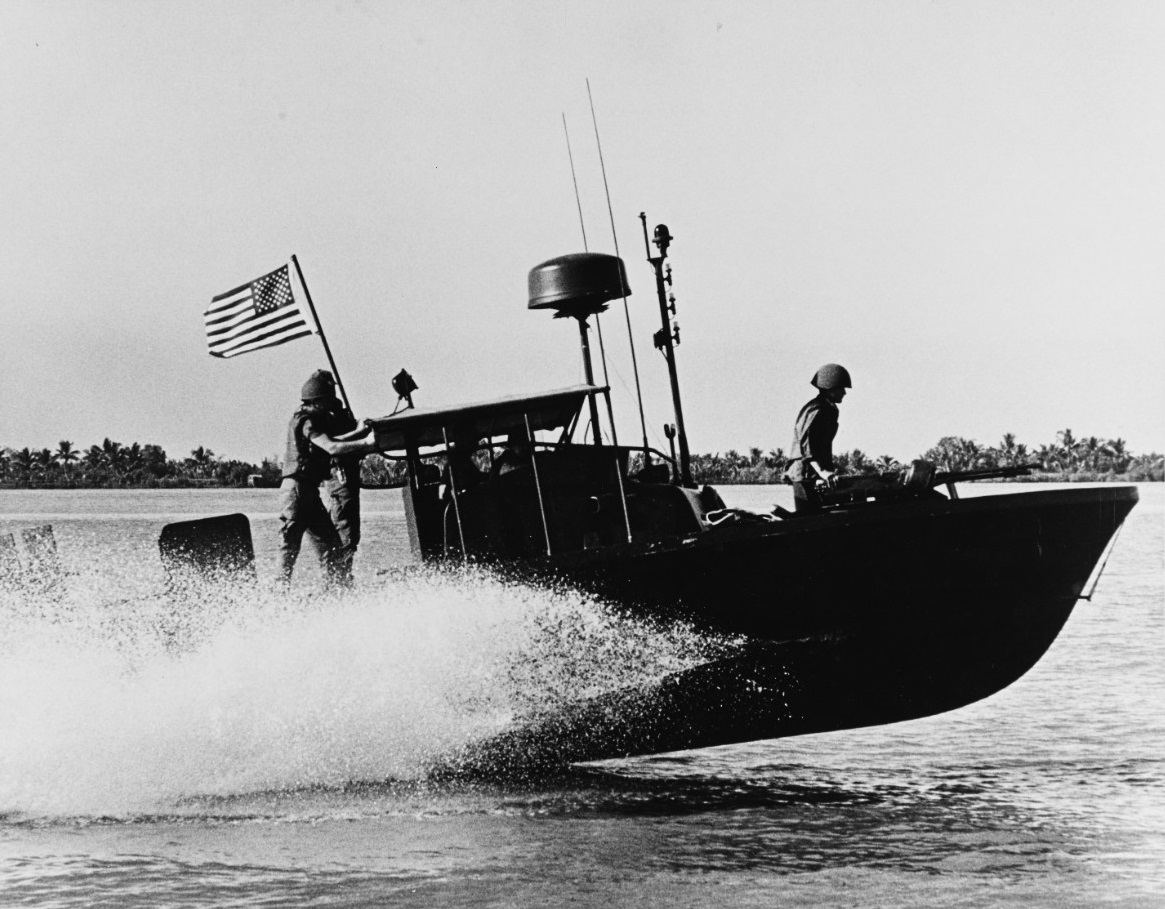
U.S. Navy Patrol Boat, River (PBR) of Task Force 116 moves at high speed down the Saigon River

The principal objective of Operation Game Warden focused sought to interdict the Viet Cong infiltration of South Vietnam in the Mekong Delta. The Navy officially expounded upon this objective in February 1966 when it stated that Task Force 116's mission was to crack down on the transportation of VC troops and supplies on the ample inland waterways, eliminate enemy lines of communication, enforce night time curfews, and defend the main shipping channels to Saigon open with constant patrolling and minesweeping in the Long Tau River.

== Operations ==
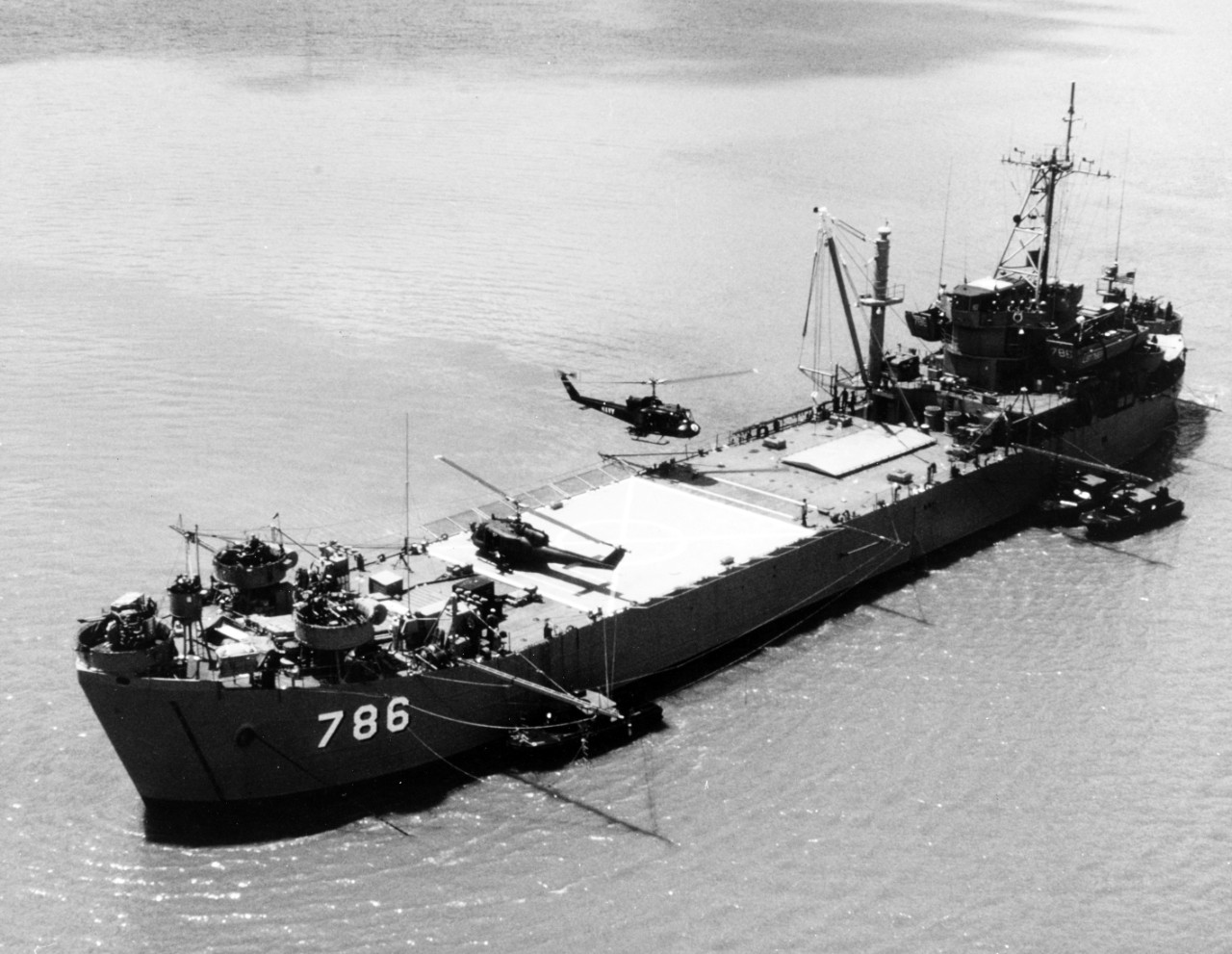
USS Garrett County anchored in the Mekong River Delta

The U.S. Navy officially created Operation Game Warden in December 1965, however actual patrols did not officially begin until February of the next year. When the operation took effect the Navy divided Task Force 116 into two separate task groups and assigned them to specific regions within the Delta. Task Group 116.1, a force of 80 PBRs, patrolled the heart of the Mekong Delta and operated out of river's edge bases in Mỹ Tho, Vĩnh Long, Cần Thơ, Sa Đéc, and Long Xuyên. Task Group 116.2, was roughly half the size and guarded the Rung Sat Special Zone using base areas in Nhà Bè and Cat Lo.

Task Force 116 focused on instituting a curfew on all waterways for the first months of action, hence devoting much of its time to searching Vietnamese sampans and junks on the river. During this time the sailors and PBRs stuck to strict rules of engagement that permitted the boats to use deadly force only after fired upon by the enemy, but as time went on tactics on both sides changed. Not only did the VC adapt to frequent daytime patrols by conducting a majority of their operations at night to use the cover of dark, but they also attempted to blend in with heavy commercial traffic during peak daylight hours. Correspondingly, the communist forces began to hide contraband, including weapons and supplies, beneath false-bottomed floors and on the underside of their sampans. Patrolling of the Rung Sat Special Zone was particularly difficult for Task Group 116.2, due to the large open areas on the South China Sea as well as the maze-like meanderings of the Long Tau River through the sector. These factors granted the VC with ample opportunities to plant mines in hopes of obstructing traffic. The mining of the Panamanian ship SS Eastern Mariner, along with the attempted mining of two other ships in Nha Be, on 26 May 1966 merely underlined the substandard security in the area during the early operations of Game Warden. The tactics employed by Task Force 116 followed a general framework during Operation Game Warden, however several adaptations were instituted to properly deal with constantly changing enemy strategies as well the treacherous terrain. Patrol boats would frequently pair up and travel in a column formation about 400–600 yards apart, a distance close enough to cover one another but far enough away to increase the effectiveness of their radars while also minimizing the threat of an effective riverside ambush. Similar to most patrolling missions, the PBRs would approach suspicious watercraft from an angle that maximized the number of weapons the boat could bear on the potential target. Searches were carried out as close to midstream as possible in order to minimize the PBRs vulnerability to surprise attacks from the riverbanks. Once the nighttime curfew was in effect, encounters occurring at night were more likely than not hostile. Task Force 116 developed numerous effective tactics throughout Operation Game Warden including the silent or drifting patrol, which called for the PBRs to speed into their patrol zone upstream, cut the engines, and allow the current to carry them through their assigned sections of river in hopes of catching the enemy off guard. Unlike other units, much of Task Force 116's development came from trial and error since it had no predecessor to draw intelligence or tactics from. For example, LSTs were primarily positioned in the South China Sea near the river mouths, however this proved impractical because the choppy sea in those locations was too rough for the small PBRs. Therefore, to accommodate the patrol boats the LST's were moved further up river, eventually as far as the Bassac-Mekong crossover (less than 20 nautical miles from the Cambodian border).

Comparable to land fighting, as the fighting intensified in areas and decreased in others U.S. base areas often shifted location. Operation Game Warden's headquarters moved from Saigon to Nhà Bè Base, then from Nhà Bè to Tra Noc, and finally from Tra Noc to Binh Thuy. The Navy also deemed it necessary to expand the two task groups into five groups in January 1968 and reassign them to individual rivers in the Delta region. The new groups and assignments included Task Group 116.1 to the Bassac River, Task Group 116.2 to the Mỹ Tho River Task Group 116.3 Upper Delta, Task Force 116.4 Co Chien River and Task Group 116.5 was assigned the Rung Sat area.

== Tet Offensive ==
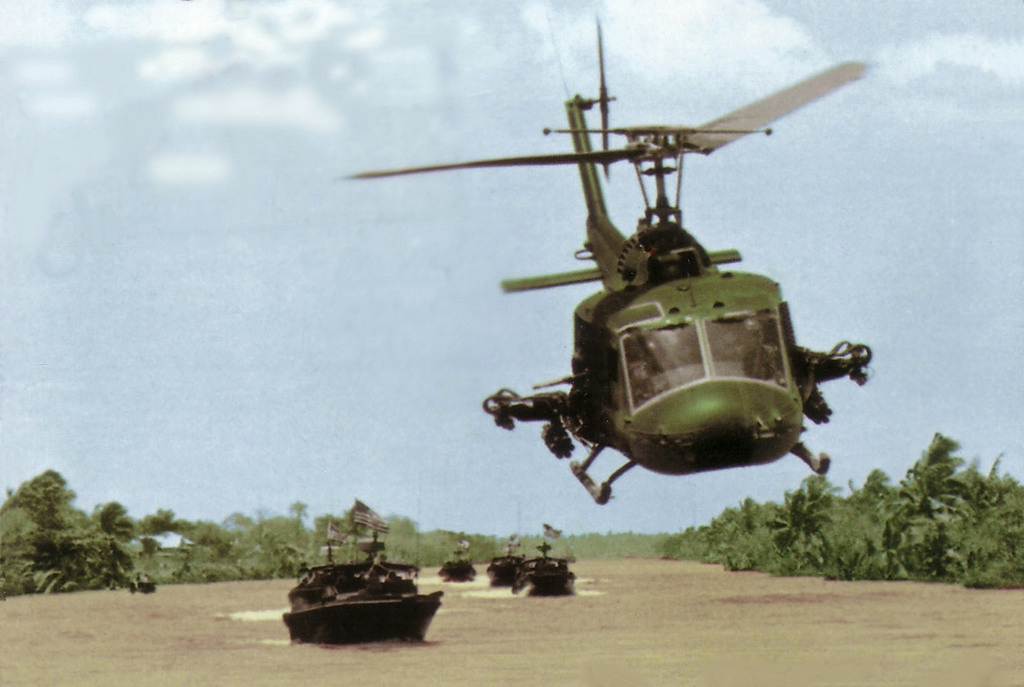
A HA(L)-3 Seawolf escorting PBRs in the Delta

The performance of Game Warden units during the Tet Offensive in early 1968 helped save several of the South Vietnamese provincial capitals from falling to enemy hands. In January 1968 the Mekong Delta was defended by a various host of forces encompassing three Army of the Republic of Vietnam (ARVN) divisions, the U.S. Army 9th Infantry Division, Marines, Task Force 116, Task Force 117 and various South Vietnamese Regional Forces and Popular Forces. Though at the time of the Tet celebrations over half of the South Vietnamese forces were on leave with only skeleton crews remaining in their stead. The MRF and other Game Warden troops played a vital role in supporting the diminished Vietnamese forces across the Delta transforming a certain defeat into a tactical victory.

== Aftermath ==
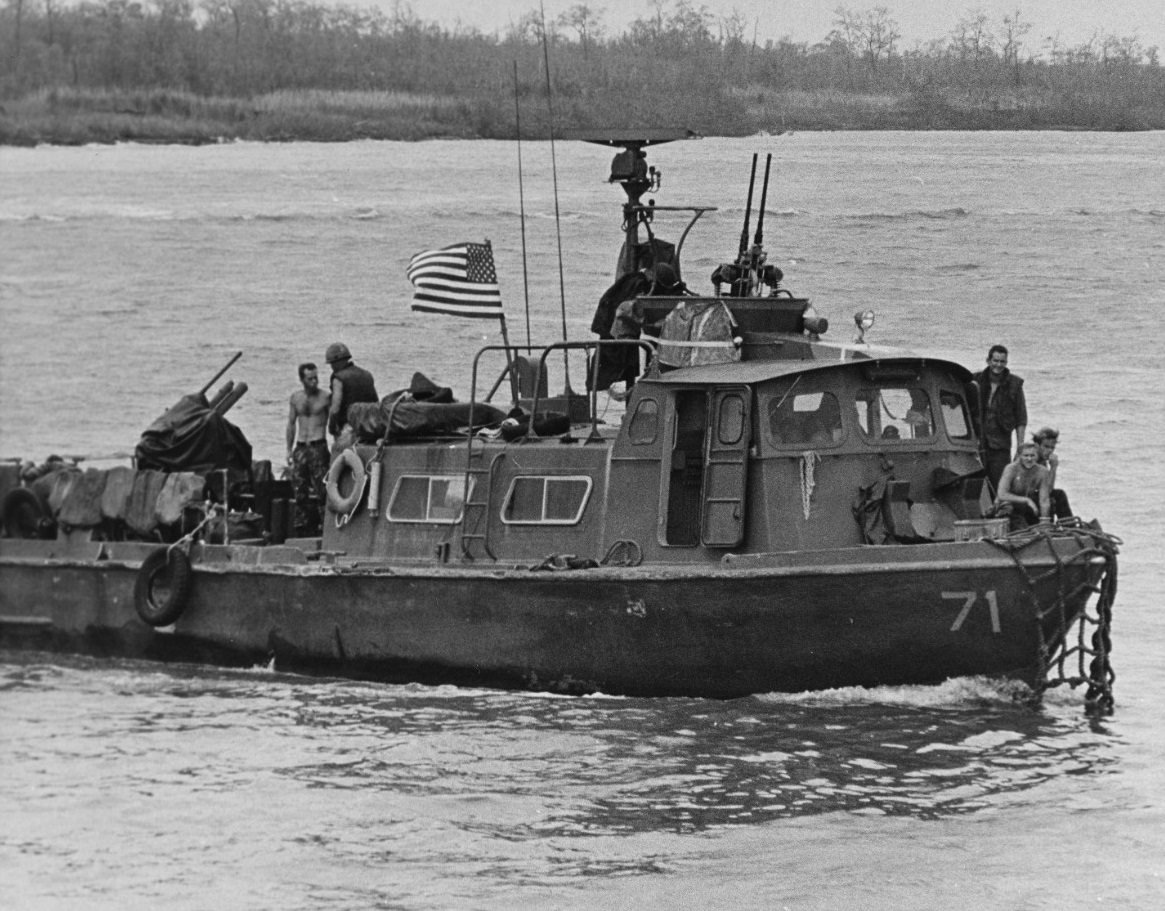
U.S. Navy Patrol Craft Fast (PCF-71), with an Underwater Demolition Team embarked, returns to the Sea Float base on the Cua Long River after a patrol

The Navy discontinued Operations Game Warden, Market Time, and Clearwater in March 1973. The efficiency of Game Warden is largely hard to determine, although the operation successfully accomplished most of its main objectives. Viet Cong defectors, referred to as "Hồi Chánh Viên", recurrently confirmed that Task Force 116's patrols greatly hindered movement in and around the Mekong Delta. One Hồi Chánh Viên stated that PBR patrols restricted the movement of supplies so much that troops in the Delta often went multiple days without food. Another Hồi Chánh Viên described a two-week period in which the VC were completely unable to transport their units across a river due to frequent PBR patrols. According to Admiral S. A. Swartztrauber, an average month of Game Warden operations would account for:

- 65,000 to 70,000 patrol hours by PBRs
- 1,500 hours of flight missions by Seawolves
- 80 engagements by PBRs
- 75 minesweeping patrols
- 60 missions by Navy SEALs
- 20 LST gunfire support missions
- 125 enemy structures destroyed
- 80 enemy watercraft destroyed

Game Warden forces lost 200 Sailors in the boats from its inception to its discontinuation, however Task Force 116's kill ratio (approximately 40 enemy KIA to every 1 American KIA) was one of the highest of U.S. forces during the Vietnam War. Two sailors of Task Force 116 were awarded the Medal of Honor: Petty Officer First Class James Williams and Seaman David George Ouellet. Nevertheless, the VC did not cease operations in the Mekong Delta but instead began focusing on disrupting traffic on the rivers and ultimately redirected their sampans and other watercraft to smaller rivers and canals to avoid combat with the more powerful PBRs.

== Units Involved ==
River Patrol Force

- River Division 51 Cần Thơ/Binh Thuy
- River Division 52 Sa Đéc (later Vĩnh Long)
- River Division 53 Mỹ Tho
- River Division 54 Nha Be River
- River Division 55 Danang

Support Ships (1966)

- USS Tutuila (ARG-4)
- USS Belle Grove (LSD-2)
- USS Comstock (LSD-19)
- USS Tortuga (LSD-26)
- USS Floyd County (LST-762)
- USS Jennings County (LST-846)

Support Ships (1967–1968)

- USS Garrett County (LST-786)
- USS Harnett County (LST-821)
- USS Hunterdon County (LST-838)
- USS Jennings County (LST-846)

== See also ==
- Operation Market Time
- Mobile Riverine Force
- Operation Sealords
- Kit Carson Scouts

== Notes ==
Bibliography

- Carhart, Tom (1984). Battles and Campaigns in Vietnam: 1954–1984. New York: Military Press. ISBN 0-517-425009. OCLC 11494209.
- Cutler, Thomas J. (1988). Brown Water, Black Berets. Annapolis, Maryland: United States Naval Institute. ISBN 0-87021-011-4. OCLC 17299589.
- Kutler, Stanley I. (1996). Encyclopedia of the Vietnam War. New York: Charles Scribner's Sons. ISBN 0-13-276932-8. OCLC 32970270.
- Olson, James S. (2008). In Country: The Illustrated Encyclopedia of the Vietnam War. New York: Metro Books. ISBN 978-1-4351-1184-4. OCLC 317495523.
- Schreadley, R. L. (1992). From the Rivers to the Sea: The U.S. Navy in Vietnam. Annapolis, Maryland: Naval Institute Press. p. 148. ISBN 0-87021-772-0. OCLC 23902015.
- Sherwood, John D. (2015). War in the Shallows: U.S. Navy Coastal and Riverine Warfare in Vietnam, 1965–1968. Washington, D.C.: Naval History and Heritage Command. ISBN 978-0-945274-76-6. OCLC 909538785.
- Summers, Harry G. Jr. (1985). The Vietnam War Almanac. New York: Random House. ISBN 0-7394-4290-2. OCLC 9730994.
