= USS Jennings County =

1945 LST-542-class tank landing ship

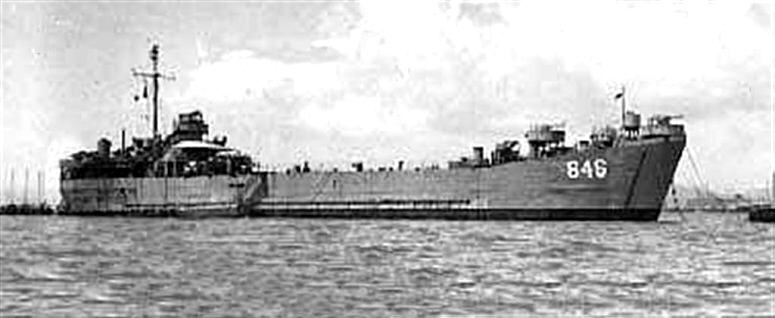
- LST-846 at anchor in Hong Kong, 30 September 1948

History

United States
- Name: USS LST-846
- Builder: American Bridge Company, Ambridge, Pennsylvania
- Laid down: 27 October 1944
- Launched: 9 January 1945
- Commissioned: 9 January 1945
- Decommissioned: 14 October 1949
- Recommissioned: 3 November 1950
- Decommissioned: 7 December 1955
- Renamed: USS Jennings County (LST-846), 1 July 1955
- Recommissioned: 11 June 1966
- Decommissioned: 25 September 1970
- Stricken: 25 September 1970
- Honours and awards: 1 battle star (Korea); 9 campaign stars (Vietnam)
- Fate: Unknown

General characteristics
- Class & type: LST-542-class tank landing ship
- Displacement: 1,625 long tons (1,651 t) light; 4,080 long tons (4,145 t) full
- Length: 328 ft (100 m)
- Beam: 50 ft (15 m)
- Draft: Unloaded : 2 ft 4 in (0.71 m) forward; 7 ft 6 in (2.29 m) aft; Loaded : 8 ft 2 in (2.49 m) forward; 14 ft 1 in (4.29 m) aft
- Propulsion: 2 × General Motors 12-567 diesel engines, two shafts, twin rudders
- Speed: 12 knots (22 km/h; 14 mph)
- Boats & landing craft carried: 2 × LCVPs
- Troops: 16 officers, 147 enlisted men
- Complement: 7 officers, 104 enlisted men
- Armament: 8 × 40 mm guns; 12 × 20 mm guns

USS Jennings County (LST-846) was an LST-542-class tank landing ship built for the United States Navy during World War II. Named after Jennings County, Indiana, she was the only U.S. Naval vessel to bear the name.

Originally laid down as LST-846 by the American Bridge Company of Ambridge, Pennsylvania on 27 October 1944; the ship was launched on 12 December, sponsored by Mrs. L. P. Quill; and commissioned on 9 January 1945.

== Service history ==
=== World War II, 1945 ===
After shakedown off Florida, LST-846 loaded cargo at New Orleans, then sailed for the Pacific in mid-February. Steaming via the Panama Canal and San Francisco, she reached Pearl Harbor on 27 March. For the next six weeks, the landing ship operated in the Hawaiian Islands before departing for Seattle on 12 May. Following repairs, LST-846 received oil, gasoline, and mechanized equipment for transport to the western Pacific. On 9 June she was underway, arriving Guam on 11 July. For the rest of the war she supported American forces in the Marshalls and Okinawa.

=== 1945–1949 ===
After the Japanese acceptance of Allied peace terms, LST-846 transported occupation forces and equipment between Japan and the Marianas. She sailed for the United States on 3 November, arriving Seattle in early December. Returning to the Far East five months later, she arrived Shanghai, China on 28 May 1946 and commenced cargo runs among Chinese ports. From 1946 to 1949, LST-846 continued these operations and in addition shuttled cargo between China and the Marianas. After the Chinese Communist Revolution, the veteran landing ship returned to the United States, arriving San Diego on 17 June 1949. LST-846 was decommissioned at Astoria, Oregon on 14 October 1949.

=== Korean War, 1950–1953 ===
After the outbreak of war in Korea, the United States intervened. To aid in the movement of men and equipment, LST-846 was recommissioned on 3 November 1950. After amphibious training along the West Coast she departed San Diego on 16 April 1951 for duty in the Western Pacific. Arriving Yokosuka early June, the landing ship operated out of Japan performing cargo runs and amphibious training until 6 September when she sailed for the east coast of Korea. After two cruises from Japan to Korea, LST-846 sailed on 5 November for a stateside overhaul. She was back in the Far East on 5 June 1952, then resumed cargo operations in Japan for the remainder of the year.

=== 1953–1955 ===
Returning San Diego on 29 March 1953, LST-846 served off the West Coast until 27 January 1954 when she sailed for another WestPac tour. During the late summer LST-846 transported French troops and vehicles along the Indochina coast, following the end of the Indochina War. She also performed station ship duties during "Operation Passage to Freedom" as naval units transported thousands of Vietnamese from North to South Vietnam after the partition of the country. Departing Yokosuka on 12 October, the veteran landing ship arriving San Diego four weeks later. Following amphibious exercises along the West Coast, she steamed to Astoria, Oregon, arriving on 9 April 1955 for overhaul. LST-846 was named USS Jennings County (LST-846) on 1 July and decommissioned at San Diego on 7 December 1955.

=== Vietnam, 1966–1970 ===
After ten years with the Pacific Reserve Fleet, Jennings County recommissioned on 11 June 1966 to support U.S. forces in South Vietnam. Jennings County departed San Diego on 11 September, arriving at Chu Lai on 11 November.

Jennings County saw extensive service during the Vietnam War, operating as part of Operation Game Warden, a brown-water navy effort to keep the rivers free of Viet Cong infiltration. Four LST were recommissioned to support river patrol operations with the intent of keeping three ships on-station at any one time supporting a River Division of 10 Patrol Boat, River (PBR), a Detachment of 2 UH-1B helicopter gunships from HC-1 Det 5 later to become HAL-3 Seawolves and a SEAL Platoon. The ship not on-station was undergoing ship repairs in the Western Pacific. Jennings County reported on-station to CTF 116 on 7 November 1966 and operated as a Patrol Craft Tender (AGP) for the next 40 months on the rivers of the Mekong Delta.

For the remainder of 1966 it conducted river patrols and in 1967 continued patrols supporting Game Warden operations. In 1970, while off the coast of Son On Doc at the southern tip of South Vietnam the ship suffered a serious fire in its auxiliary engine room that rendered it unable to continue operations. As a result, HAL-3 got the ice cream from the freezers before they departed station. The ship was removed from station, and later, the USS Garrett County took its place as a patrol craft tender in support of river patrol operations.

Decommissioned on 25 September 1970, at Naval Station Subic Bay, Republic of the Philippines and struck from the Naval Vessel Register. The ship's final fate is unknown.

== Awards ==
LST-846 earned two battle star for the Korean War, and as Jennings County was awarded two Presidential Unit Citations, two Navy Unit Commendations, nine campaign stars for Vietnam War service.
