= USS Hunterdon County =

1944 LST-542-class tank landing ship

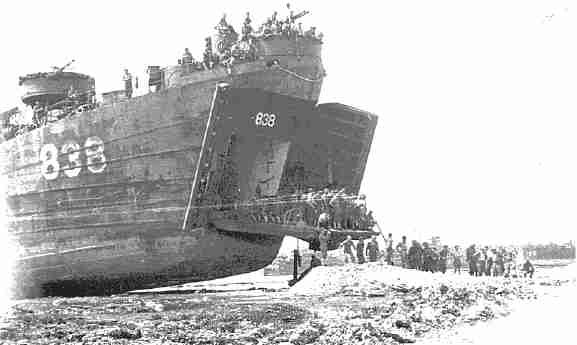
- USS LST-838 beached, date and place unknown

History

United States
- Name: USS LST-838
- Builder: American Bridge Company, Ambridge, Pennsylvania
- Laid down: 20 September 1944
- Launched: 8 November 1944
- Commissioned: 4 December 1944
- Decommissioned: 7 August 1946
- Renamed: USS Hunterdon County (LST-838), 1 July 1955
- Recommissioned: 10 September 1966
- Decommissioned: 1 August 1974
- Reclassified: AGP-838 (Patrol Craft Tender), 1967
- Stricken: 1 August 1974
- Honours and awards: 1 battle star (World War II); 7 battle stars, 2 Presidential Unit Citations, 4 Navy Unit Commendations (Vietnam)
- Fate: Transferred to Malaysia, 1 August 1974

History

Malaysia
- Name: KD Sri Langkawi (A1500)
- Acquired: 1 August 1974
- Fate: Scrapped
- Badge

General characteristics
- Class & type: LST-542-class tank landing ship
- Displacement: 1,625 long tons (1,651 t) light; 4,080 long tons (4,145 t) full
- Length: 328 ft (100 m)
- Beam: 50 ft (15 m)
- Draft: Unloaded : 2 ft 4 in (0.71 m) forward; 7 ft 6 in (2.29 m) aft; Loaded : 8 ft 2 in (2.49 m) forward; 14 ft 1 in (4.29 m) aft
- Propulsion: 2 × General Motors 12-567 diesel engines, two shafts, twin rudders
- Speed: 12 knots (22 km/h; 14 mph)
- Boats & landing craft carried: 2 × LCVPs
- Troops: 16 officers, 147 enlisted men
- Complement: 7 officers, 104 enlisted men
- Armament: 1 × single 3"/50 caliber gun mount; 8 × 40 mm guns; 12 × 20 mm guns

USS Hunterdon County (LST-838) was an LST-542-class tank landing ship built for the United States Navy during World War II, and later reconfigured and recommissioned for riverine warfare during the Vietnam War. Named after Hunterdon County, New Jersey, she was the only U.S. Naval vessel to bear the name.

USS LST-838 was laid down on 20 September 1944 at Ambridge, Pennsylvania by the American Bridge Company; launched on 8 November 1944; sponsored by Miss Margaret Foster; and commissioned on 4 December 1944.

== Service history ==
=== World War II, 1944–1946 ===
After shakedown off Florida, LST-838 loaded heavy construction equipment at New Orleans and departed on 5 January 1945. Loading troops and additional cargo at Pearl Harbor, the landing ship sailed to the Mariana Islands, arriving at Guam on 4 March. She unloaded her cargo, then steamed to Saipan where she loaded equipment and embarked units of the 130th Naval Construction Battalion for the invasion of Okinawa, sailing on 25 March.

LST-838 arrived off the southern Okinawa beaches on 1 April. Despite determined efforts by the enemy, Allied forces succeeded in securing a beachhead. On D-Day, after LST-884 was struck by a suicide plane, LST-838 recovered 79 survivors from the heavily damaged ship. The landing ship stood off the coast of Okinawa until 13 April when she approached Green Beach to discharge Seabees and construction equipment. The following day during one of the many raids she shot down a Japanese aircraft. Departing Okinawa on the 16th, LST-838 arrived at Ulithi six days later. For the rest of the war she transported men and equipment throughout the South and Western Pacific Islands.

Following the end of the war, LST-838 moved men and equipment to Japan for occupation duties. She remained in the Far East until 7 November, when she departed Yokohama for Guam; then embarked 544 Army veterans and steamed to the United States, arriving at San Francisco on 23 December.

She was decommissioned on 7 August 1946 and assigned to the Pacific Reserve Fleet. On 1 July 1955 she was redesignated USS Hunterdon County (LST-838).

=== Vietnam War, 1966–1971 ===
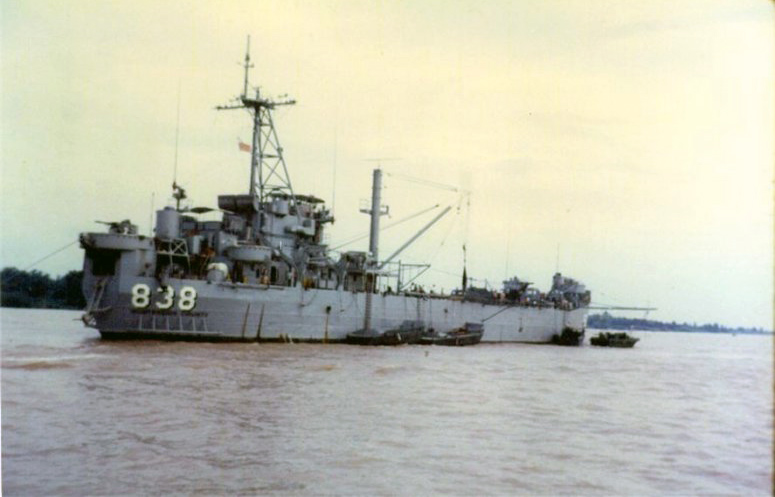
USS Hunterdon County (AGP-838) anchored at Ham Loung River, South Vietnam, 1967.

Recommissioned on 10 September 1966 at the Mare Island Navy Yard, Vallejo, California, Hunterdon County saw extensive service during the Vietnam War, operating as part of Operation Game Warden, a brown-water navy effort to keep the rivers free of Viet Cong (VC) infiltration. Four LST were recommissioned to support river patrol operations with the intent of keeping three ships on-station at any one time supporting a River Division of 10 River Patrol Boats (PBR), a Detachment of 2 UH-1 Helicopter Gunships from HC-1, later HAL-3 Seawolves and a SEAL Platoon. The ship not on-station was undergoing ship repairs in the Western Pacific. Hunterdon County reported on-station to CTF 116 on 20 March 1967 and operated as a Patrol Craft Tender (AGP) for the next 49 months on the rivers of the Mekong Delta.

On 12 May 1970, it was the first U.S. Navy commissioned vessel to enter Cambodia, rearming and refueling helicopters that belonged to the U.S. Army and Navy, as well as the South Vietnamese air force. According to "The Jackstaff News," the official Navy paper for "U.S. Naval Forces II, III, and IV Corps Vietnam":

The Hunterdon County was the first U.S. ship to cross the Cambodian border, 12 May [1970], after President Nixon's decision to enter that country. It remained there and continued to provide support to the Vietnamese armed forces and their U.S. Army and Navy advisors longer than any other ship of its type, according to Navy officials.

The ship's credits in Vietnam include capturing one of the largest VC in the Delta on 29 March 1969, and establishing the record for the furthest transit of the Bassac River by a U.S. commissioned vessel in August of that same year. The ship was subsequently reclassified as Patrol Craft Tender USS Hunterdon County (AGP-838).

=== Transfer to Malaysia, 1971 ===
Transferred to Malaysia on 1 August 1971 under the Security Assistance Program, she was renamed KD Sri Langkawi (A1500) for service in the Royal Malaysian Navy, and struck from the Naval Vessel Register the same day. She was scrapped by Malaysian Authorities.

== Awards ==
LST-838 earned one battle star for World War II service. Additionally, Hunterdon County (AGP 838) earned seven battle stars, two awards of the Presidential Unit Citation, and seven awards of the Navy Unit Commendation for the Vietnam War.

== Photo gallery ==
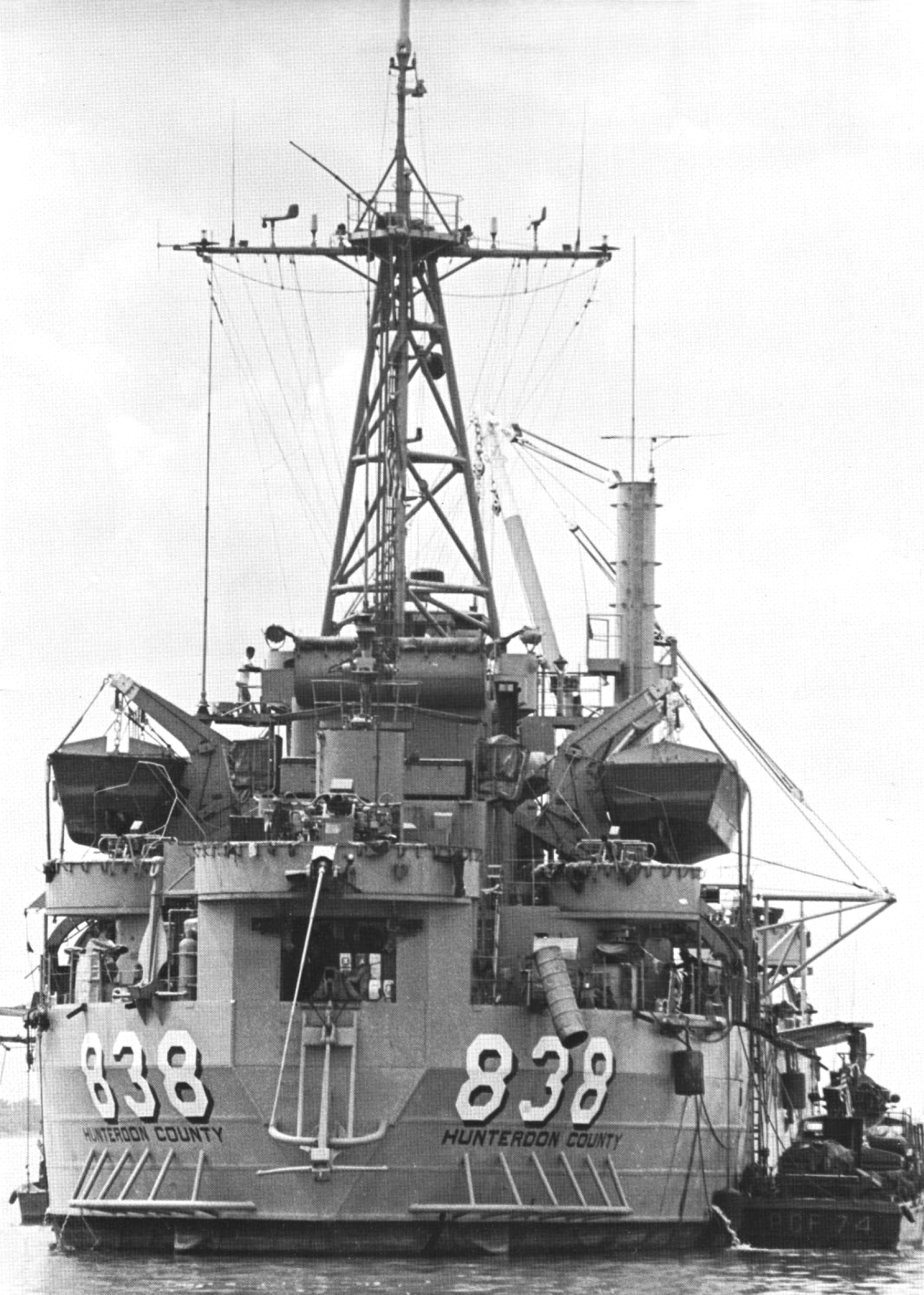
Anchored in the middle of the Mekong River about seven miles inside Cambodia, replenishing Vietnamese and American forces operating there during May 1970

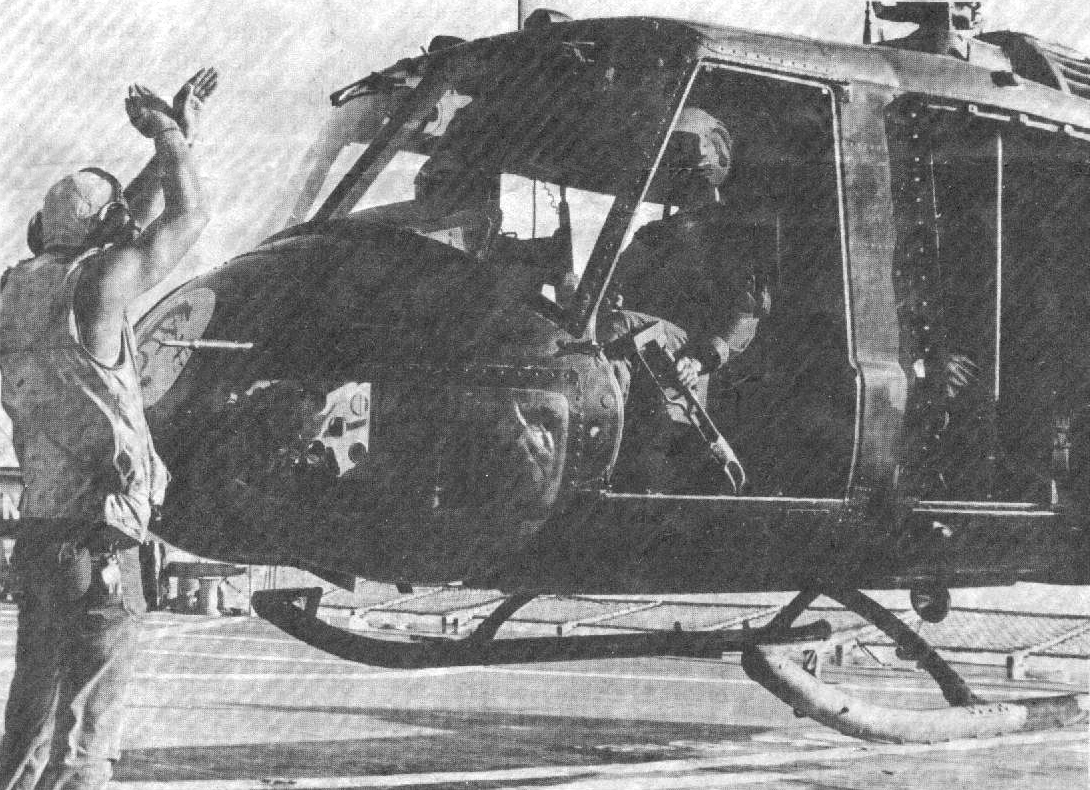
"Seawolf" helicopter gunship makes a quick refueling and rearming stop atop Hunterdon County during May 1970 U.S. Navy incursion into Cambodia
