= USS Tortuga (LSD-26) =

1945 Casa Grande-class dock landing ship

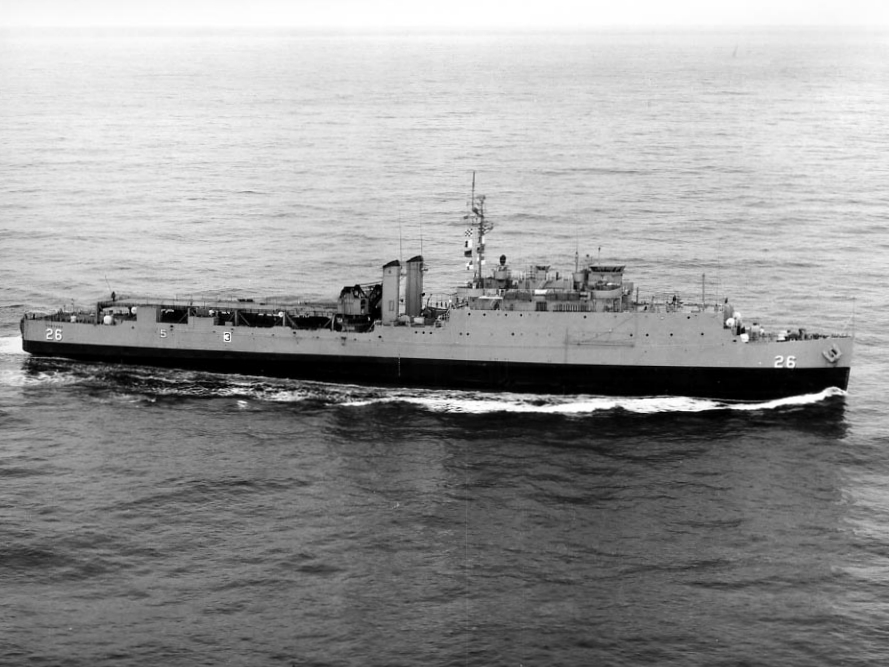
- USS Tortuga (LSD-26) at sea in the 1960s

History

United States
- Name: USS Tortuga
- Namesake: Dry Tortugas
- Builder: Boston Navy Yard
- Laid down: 16 October 1944
- Launched: 21 January 1945
- Commissioned: 8 June 1945
- Decommissioned: 26 January 1970
- Stricken: 15 October 1976
- Nickname(s): Collin's Ship
- Honors and awards: 5 battle stars (Korea); 8 battle stars (Vietnam)
- Fate: Ran aground and scrapped, 1987-88

General characteristics
- Class & type: Casa Grande-class dock landing ship
- Displacement: 4,490 long tons (4,562 t)
- Length: 457 ft 9 in (139.52 m)
- Beam: 72 ft 2 in (22.00 m)
- Propulsion: 2 geared turbines, 7,400 shp (5,518 kW), 2 shafts
- Speed: 15 knots (28 km/h; 17 mph)
- Complement: 326
- Armament: 1 × 5"/38 caliber DP gun; 2 × twin 40 mm guns; 2 × quad 40 mm guns; 16 × single 20 mm guns

USS Tortuga (LSD-26) was a Casa Grande-class dock landing ship in the United States Navy. She was the first Navy ship to be named for the Dry Tortugas, a group of desert coral islets 60 miles west of Key West, Florida, which were discovered in 1513 by Spanish explorer Ponce de Leon.

Tortuga was laid down on 16 October 1944 by the Boston Navy Yard; launched on 21 January 1945; sponsored by Mrs. George T. Paine; and commissioned on 8 June 1945.

== History ==
=== 1945-1947 ===
Commissioned during the final phase of World War II, Tortuga conducted shakedown in the Virginia Capes area and was at Colón, Canal Zone, en route to the Pacific combat area on 15 August 1945 when she received news of Japan's surrender. The dock landing ship soon proceeded to Buckner Bay, Okinawa, and subsequently operated in Korean and Chinese waters, repairing small craft and serving in the mobile support unit attached to Amphibious Forces, Pacific Fleet. Operating initially out of Jinsen (now Inchon), Korea, Tortuga subsequently conducted her support missions out of Tsingtao, Taku, and Shanghai, China; Hong Kong; and Yokosuka, Japan. In the spring of 1947, the ship returned to the west coast of the United States, via Guam and Pearl Harbor, and was decommissioned and placed in reserve at San Diego on 18 August 1947.

=== 1950-1953 ===
Following the outbreak of a civil war between North Korea and South Korea in the summer of 1950, Tortuga was recommissioned on 15 September 1950. Reactivated in response to the Navy's need for amphibious ships created by the Korean War, the landing ship dock underwent an abbreviated refitting and shakedown before she sailed for Japan on 29 December. Proceeding via Pearl Harbor and Eniwetok, she arrived at Sasebo on 3 February 1951. Tortuga participated in a feint landing which preceded the operation mounted to recapture the strategic port of Inchon.

About this time, intelligence reports indicated that the Chinese Communists might take advantage of American preoccupation with the war in Korea by mounting an invasion, across the Taiwan Strait, of Nationalist-held Formosa. American strategists felt that, in such an endeavor, the Communist Chinese would utilize many seagoing junks since, in operations off Korea, vessels of this type had proven to be almost unsinkable. Accordingly, Tortuga raised eight 60-foot junks from the depths of Inchon harbor and transported them to Yokosuka to be studied to determine what ordnance would be most effective against them.

Tortuga remained in the Far East through 1952 for two more Korean deployments. During the first, the landing ship provided support services at Inchon; and, in the second, she took part in the massive amphibious feint at Kojo, North Korea, from 13 to 16 October 1952, and in operations off Wonsan, supporting mine-craft in November and December. During 1953, Tortuga participated in the Korean prisoner-of-war exchange after the Panmunjom Armistice and also conducted landing exercises and maneuvers in the Far East and off the west coast of the United States.

=== 1954-1964 ===
Tortuga was deployed to the Western Pacific (WestPac) again in 1954. The signing of the Geneva Accords which ended the fighting between the French and Viet Minh resulted in the creation of two Vietnams — North and South. The former was to be in Communist hands; the latter was to be governed by non-Communist leaders. Diverted to Haiphong from Yokosuka, Tortuga arrived at her destination on 21 August 1954 to take part in the massive evacuation of French nationals, in "Operation Passage to Freedom", as well as the moving of Vietnamese who chose not to live in the north. The landing ship conducted four round trips from Haiphong in the north to Tourane (now Da Nang), Saigon, and Nha Trang in the south, before she returned to Yokosuka on 4 October. For the remainder of the year, she conducted minesweeper support operations in Korean waters.

During the 14 years from 1955 to 1969, Tortuga would remain employed in a regular schedule of deployments to WestPac. In 1958, Tortuga conducted operations in the Marshall Islands. She was based at San Diego until 30 June 1966, when her home port was changed to Long Beach. In between deployments — which included exercises and equipment lifts and labors to help maintain the 7th Fleet's readiness — Tortuga conducted local operations out of west coast ports and underwent progressive modifications during regular availabilities.

=== 1964-1965 ===
As American involvement in Southeast Asia deepened during the latter half of the 1960s, Tortuga's deployment schedule accordingly reflected her role in the buildup of Allied strength to attempt to check communist domination of Southeast Asia. Soon after receiving word of the Gulf of Tonkin Incident, Tortuga — combat-loaded — got underway from Buckner Bay. She remained underway in the South China Sea from 6 August to 19 September before returning to Subic Bay.

For the remainder of the year 1964, Tortuga operated out of Yokosuka and conducted troop and equipment lifts between Japan and Okinawa until she headed home and arrived back at San Diego on 18 December. In February 1965, the landing ship proceeded to Camp Pendleton, California, to participate in Exercise "Silver Lance," the largest peacetime landing exercise ever held. In June, she commenced a WestPac deployment. She proceeded to Buckner Bay and Da Nang and, after operating in the Orient through the early summer, returned to Long Beach in late August 1965. She subsequently conducted a lift to Okinawa before she returned to San Diego for refresher training.

=== 1966-1967 ===
Tortuga sailed for Vietnamese waters on 1 March 1966, arrived at Vung Tau on 18 April, and relieved USS Belle Grove as support ship for Operation Game Warden — the Navy's operation designed to interdict the flow of Communist supplies along the coastlines of South Vietnam. Initially, Tortuga operated in the Rung Sat Special Zone between Saigon and Vung Tau, helping to guard the entrance to the shipping channels snaking through Viet Cong (VC) territory to the capital city.

Tortuga shifted to the Mekong Delta region on 12 June to serve as a floating base for the Navy's fast PBR's of Task Force 116 and for a detachment of Army Bell UH-1B Huey helicopter gunships. Initially, the helicopters were from the 145th Aviation Detachment, however, by the end of Tortuga's tour, they were Navy aircraft from Task Force "Sea Wolf."

During her support operations with the riverine assault groups, Tortuga received a number of distinguished visitors ranging from General William C. Westmoreland, Commander, Military Assistance Group; Rear Admiral Norvell G. Ward, Commander, Naval Forces Vietnam; as well as United States Ambassador to South Vietnam Henry Cabot Lodge; and news commentator Chet Huntley, who brought with him an NBC camera team to record a news story on Tortuga's river-patrol base activities.

Her deployment completed in the summer of 1966, Tortuga got underway on 30 August and steamed via Japan to the west coast. She arrived at San Diego on 7 November for leave, upkeep, and overhaul. The refit lasted through April 1967, modernizing the ship and preparing her for another WestPac deployment. Following a period of refresher training and amphibious exercises, Tortuga sailed on 21 July 1967 from San Diego and arrived, via Hawaii, Guam, and the Philippines, at Da Nang on 5 September.

Upon arrival, Tortuga relieved USS Monticello with Amphibious Ready Group "Bravo" and operated with that unit into the fall of 1967. She took part in Operations Fortress Sentry and Formation Leader, before her detachment from ARG "B" on 9 November. Subsequently, Tortuga loaded a cargo of disabled or damaged CH-46 Sea Knight helicopters for transport from Da Nang to Okinawa, where they were repaired for further service. For the remainder of the year, from 3 to 31 December, Tortuga conducted cargo lifts from Japanese ports to Vietnam and vice versa.

=== 1968-1969 ===
Tortuga then returned to the west coast — via Yokosuka, Buckner Bay, Subic Bay, Hong Kong and Pearl Harbor — and arrived at Long Beach on 9 March 1968. For the remainder of the year, the landing ship conducted exercises and local operations put of Long Beach, until again deploying to WestPac in February 1969. On 17 February, while en route to Yokosuka, Tortuga conducted her first underway refueling — with USS Cook receiving 31,000 gallons of Navy Special Fuel Oil (NSFO). Upon arrival at Yokosuka, Tortuga's in-port time was extended to allow the on-loading of a complete destroyer radar system for transport to Subic Bay. Underway on 11 March with her special cargo, the landing ship soon reached Subic Bay, unloaded, and proceeded for Kaohsiung, Taiwan, en route to South Vietnam.

On the last leg of her Vietnam-bound voyage, Tortuga instituted a stepped-up shipboard defense program consisting of daily general quarters drills, exercising especially with the ship's guns and in damage control problems — for the ship had received intelligence reports that a VC rocket attack was expected to coincide with her arrival at Da Nang. When paraflares were sighted on the horizon at 02:00 on 14 March, Tortuga knew that she had arrived at her destination and went to general quarters. The expected attack failed to materialize, though, and Tortuga unloaded her cargo unmolested but at piers which, only the day before, had been rocketed by the VC. When the offloading was completed, Tortuga shifted her berth far away from most of the shipping in the harbor. There, boat crews bent to the task of loading old ammunition on the ship. Meanwhile, one boat crew, composed of one officer and five enlisted men, armed with rifles and Thompson submachine guns, kept a constant vigil in an LCVP which circled the ship at a distance of 60-70 yards. Periodically, at odd intervals, the boat's crew would drop percussion grenades in the water in an effort calculated to discourage enemy frogmen. When the task was completed, the ship got underway for the Philippines.

Reaching Subic Bay after an uneventful passage, the ship unloaded the explosives and soon received orders to transport a much-needed suction dredge up the Saigon River to Nhà Bè Base, through territory largely controlled by the VC. At Tan My, Tortuga embarked the dredge and a warping tug and got underway. During the transit of the Saigon River, the landing ship stood to general quarters, keeping a sharp eye for enemy attempts to impede the progress of the ship. The enemy failed to appear, however, and Tortuga, her dredge, and her tug arrived at Nhà Bè soon thereafter.

From 5 May to 20 May, Tortuga participated in Operation Daring Rebel, an operation mounted to seek out and destroy VC rest camps on Barrier Island, 15 miles (24 km) south of Da Nang. Joining USS Duluth, USS Winston and USS Okinawa, Tortuga closed the beachhead, while USS White River stood offshore to provide initial bombardment. When White River launched a heavy rocket barrage shoreward, the operation got underway. Landing craft splashed ashore while troop-carrying helicopters quickly airlifted troops ashore in the vertical-envelopment phase of the operation. For the next two weeks, Tortuga served as primary control ship for the operation which located and destroyed caches of food and ammunition and VC rest camps.

The landing ship again served as primary control ship (PCS) in Da Nang harbor during Operation Gallant Leader, a follow-up to Operation Daring Rebel. Relieved by Duluth on 23 May, Tortuga set sail soon thereafter for Buckner Bay and simulated combat landings during exercises with Assault Craft Unit 1 in late June. In July, Tortuga transported the first increment of Marines and their equipment for Operation Keystone Eagle, from Cửa Việt Base, South Vietnam, to White Beach, Okinawa, before returning up the Saigon River to Nha Be with a load of palletized cargo.

Subsequently, supporting Operation Sea Float, delivering two pontoons and 32 pallets of ammunition from Nhà Bè to Tân Mỹ Base, Tortuga onloaded men and equipment from "Charlie" Battery, 1st Light Antiaircraft Missile Battalion (LAAM), 1st Marine Aircraft Wing, at Da Nang harbor for transport to the west coast of the United States. In this last operation, the second increment of Operation Keystone Eagle, Tortuga headed "stateside" for the last time, and arrived at Seal Beach, California, on 12 September 1969, unloading the 58 Hawk missiles of the 1st LAAM Battalion, USMC, and then proceeding to the Long Beach Naval Shipyard.

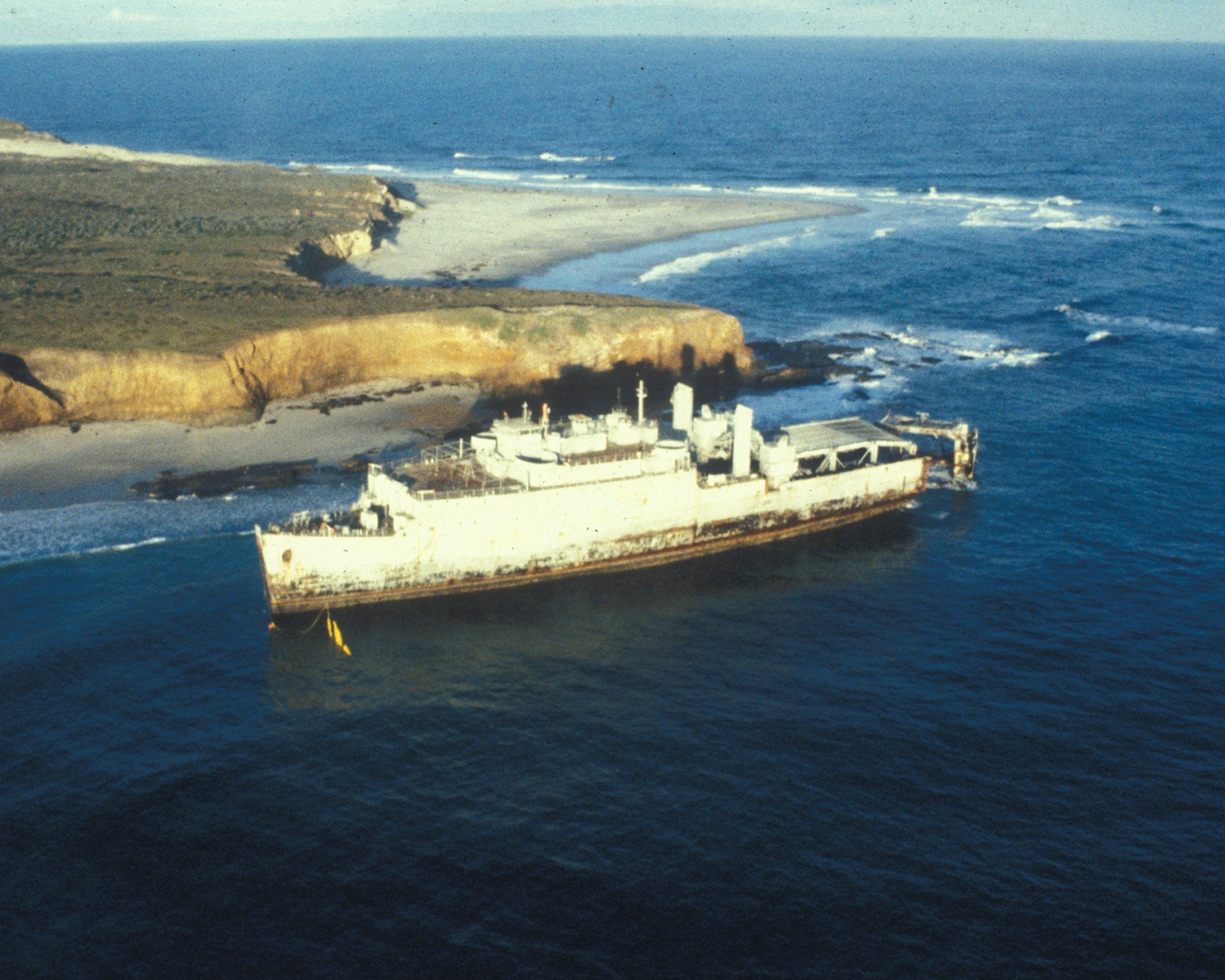
The wreck of Tortuga on San Miguel Island in 1987

Tortuga disembarked her marines and proceeded to pier 7 where she was moored outboard of USS Carter Hall. On 3 January 1970, Tortuga got underway for the Inactivation Facility at Mare Island, where she was decommissioned on 26 January 1970. Transferred to the temporary custody of the Maritime Administration (MARAD) on 6 October 1970, the ship was berthed at Suisun Bay, California, where she was later placed in permanent custody of MARAD on 1 September 1971. She was struck from the Navy list on 15 October 1976.

Tortuga was awarded five engagement stars for her Korean War service and eight for service off Vietnam.

From 1983 to 1987 Tortuga was used as a target ship and based at Port Hueneme, California. During trials the ship was repeatedly hit by Tomahawk missiles. On 15 December 1987 Tortuga ran aground on San Miguel Island after breaking its tow during a storm. The ship was scrapped on site, with the process taking over eight months to complete.

== Awards and decorations ==

| 1st Row | | Navy Unit Commendation | China Service Medal (extended) | |
| 2nd Row | American Campaign Medal | Asiatic-Pacific Campaign Medal | World War II Victory Medal | Navy Occupation Service Medal w/ Asia clasp |
| 3rd Row | National Defense Service Medal w/ 1 service star | Korean Service Medal w/ 5 service stars | Armed Forces Expeditionary Medal | Vietnam Service Medal w/ 8 service stars |
| 4th Row | Republic of Vietnam Gallantry Cross Unit Citation | United Nations Service Medal | Republic of Vietnam Campaign Medal | Republic of Korea War Service Medal |
