= Operation Jackstay =

Part of the Vietnam War (1966)

- Part of the Vietnam War
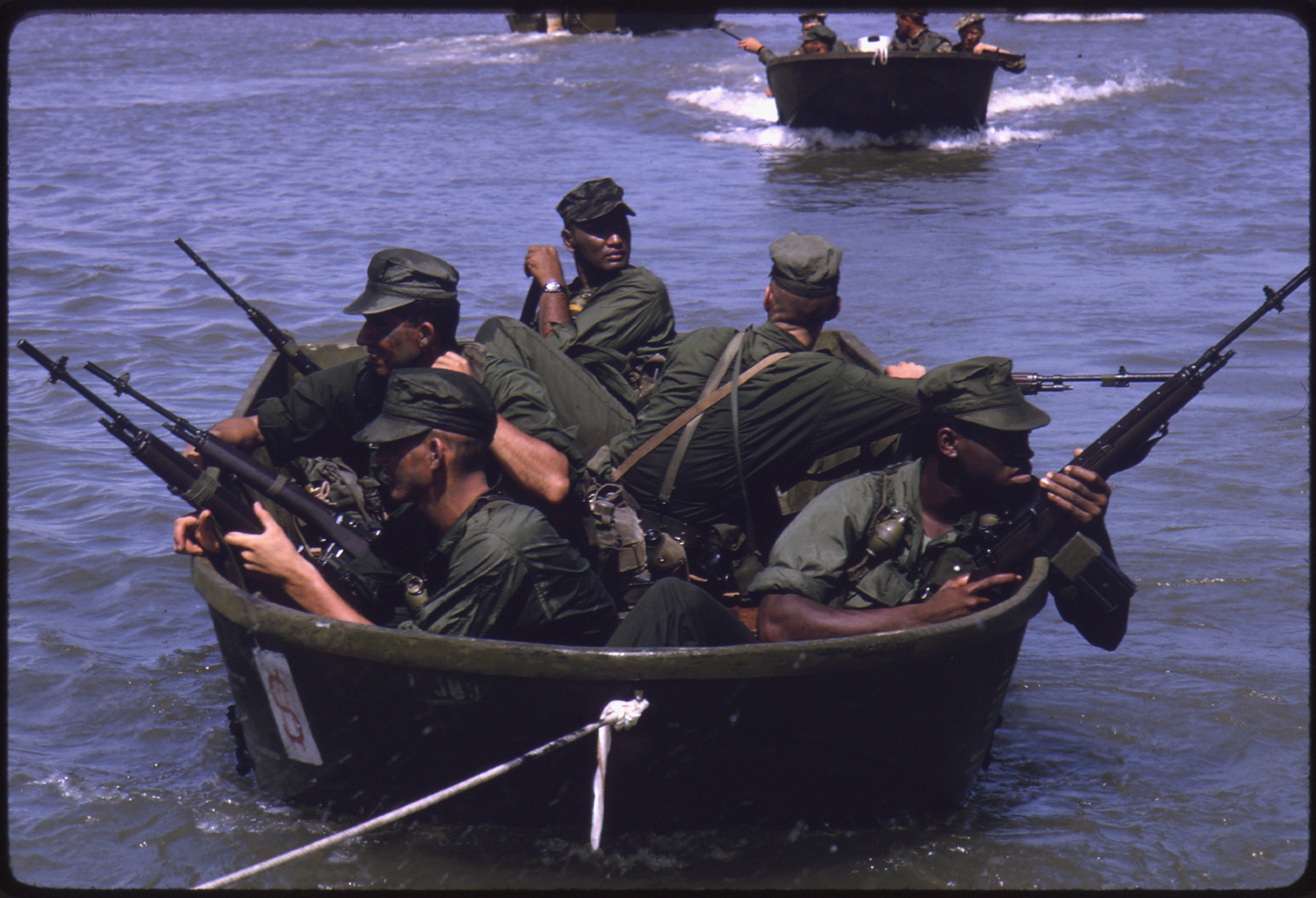
- U.S. Marines prepare for an amphibious assault during Operation Jackstay
Date	26 March – 6 April 1966
Location	Rung Sat Special Zone (Rừng Sác)
Result	Allied operational success

Belligerents
United States; South Vietnam	Viet Cong

Commanders and leaders
(United States) Captain John D. Westervelt (United States) Colonel J. R. Burnett	

Units involved
(United States) 1st Battalion, 5th Marines (South Vietnam) 2 Marine battalions	

Casualties and losses
(United States) 5 killed	63 killed

Operation Jackstay was a joint U.S. Marine Corps, U.S. Navy, U.S. Coast Guard and Republic of Vietnam Marine Division operation in the Rung Sat Special Zone, South Vietnam that took place from 26 March to 6 April 1966.

== Background ==
On 26 February 1966, the Viet Cong (VC) ambushed SS Lorinda, a Panamanian coastal freighter, on the Lòng Tàu River 18 miles (29 km) south of Saigon, wounding six of the crew and causing the freighter to run aground. Military Assistance Command, Vietnam (MACV) decided that a large-scale amphibious raid in the area would be necessary to ease VC pressure on the shipping channel.

Phase 1 of the operation plan called for an amphibious assault on the Long Thành Peninsula (where much of the Rừng Sác's population lived) by the 1st Battalion, 5th Marines deployed by USS Princeton, USS Pickaway, USS Alamo, USS Belle Grove and USS Merrick. Naval gunfire support would be provided by USS Robison and four PCFs and six Coast Guard patrol boats of Operation Market Time, while air support would be provided by the USS Hancock air group. Phase 2 would see the Marines moved deeper into the zone. The planners realized that such a small assault force could not eradicate the VC in the zone and the operation was only intended to disrupt VC operations and demonstrate that the Allies could penetrate their safe havens.

== Operation ==
The operation began on the morning of 26 March with a preliminary bombardment by Robison and aircraft from Hancock. A Marine company then landed from surface craft near Dong Hoa on the western end of the peninsula. Two companies were then landed on the center and eastern end of the peninsula by helicopter encountering only scattered sniper fire. During the first night 21 four–man night observation posts were established. The VC attacked one position with grenades killing 2 Marines and starting a brief firefight that resulted in 3 VC killed.

That same night the VC ambushed PCF-31 1 mile (1.6 km) inland from Cần Giờ on the Long Thanh Peninsula, seriously wounding one crewman and severely damaging the PCF.

On 28 March the Marines landed unopposed on the Soài Rạp River. On 31 March following airstrikes from the Hancock air group, gunfire from USS Henry County and USS Washoe County and Ontos fire from the deck of Henry County the Marines assaulted the banks of the Vam Sat River, a major VC logistical area linking a VC headquarters with the Soài Rạp. The landing was unopposed and the Marines discovered a VC weapons cache with 18 carbines and 1,000 grenades.

Over the following days the U.S. Marines and South Vietnamese Marines conducted three further amphibious assaults into the zone uncovering VC base areas and supplies, but without meeting any serious resistance.

== Aftermath ==
Operation Jackstay concluded on 6 April. 63 Viet Cong and 5 U.S. personnel were killed in the operation. The Marines discovered and destroyed Viet Cong arms factories, training camps, a headquarters complex, and a hospital. Large amounts of rice and supplies were captured, including 60,000 rounds of ammunition and 300 pounds of gunpowder.

The operation was regarded as a success in that it disrupted the VC infrastructure in the area and there was a noticeable decline in VC activity throughout the zone following the operation.
