= USS Belle Grove =

United States Naval Vessel

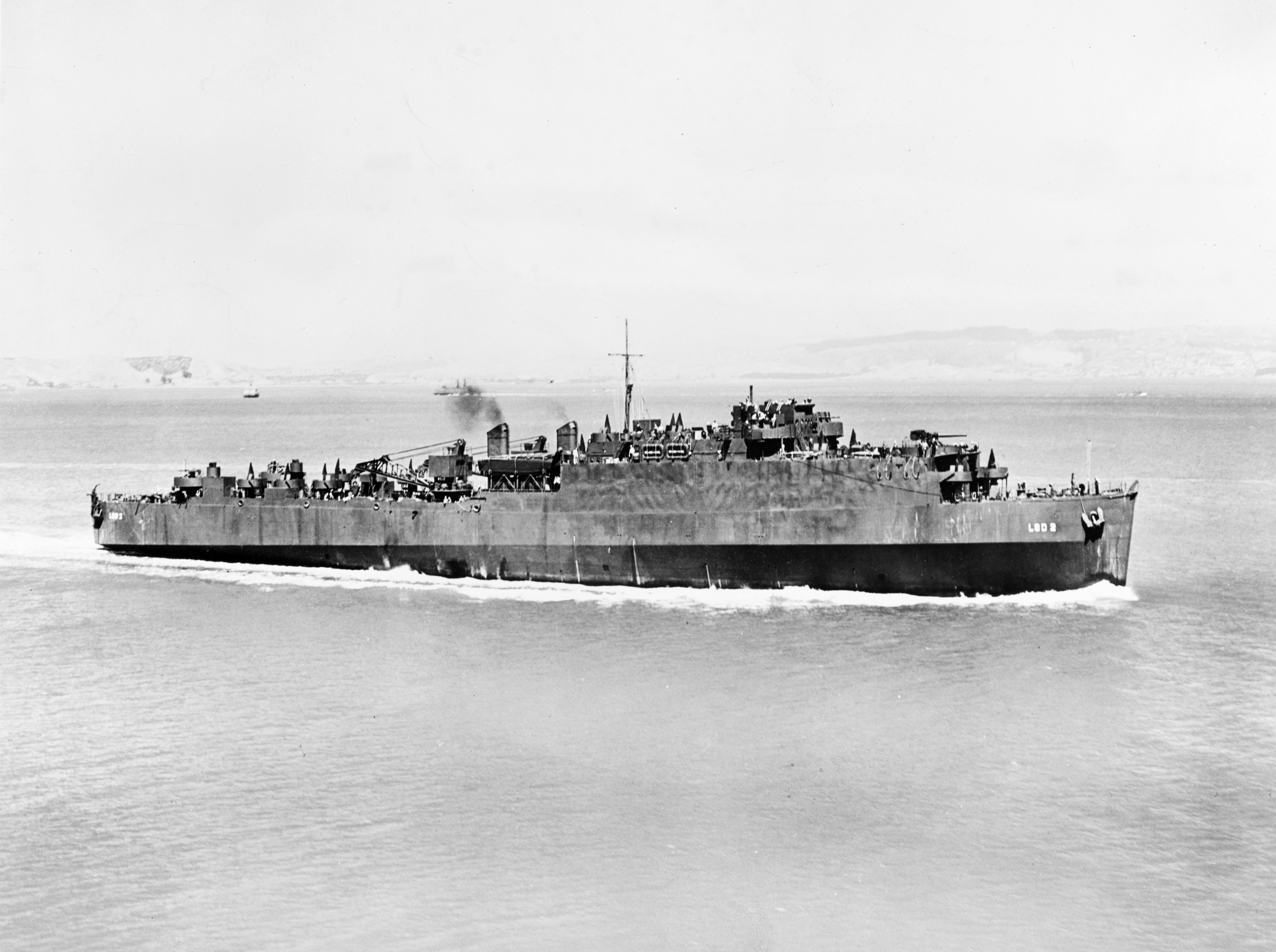
- USS Belle Grove (LSD-2) undergoing sea trials in San Francisco Bay, 16 August 1943.

History

United States
- Name: USS Belle Grove
- Namesake: Belle Grove Plantation, in Port Conway, Virginia
- Builder: Moore Dry Dock Company
- Laid down: 27 October 1942
- Launched: 17 February 1943
- Commissioned: 9 August 1943
- Decommissioned: 12 November 1969
- Stricken: 12 November 1969
- Motto: "The Two Can Do!"
- Fate: Sold for scrap, 24 July 1970

General characteristics
- Displacement: 7,930 tons (loaded), 4,032 tons (light draft)
- Length: 457 ft 9 in (139.5 m) overall
- Beam: 72 ft 2 in (22.0 m)
- Draft: 15 ft 5½ in (4.7 m) fwd, 16 ft 2 in (4.9 m) aft (loaded)
- Propulsion: 2 Babcock & Wilcox boilers, oil-fired; 2 Skinner Uni-Flow reciprocating engines; Twin screws
- Speed: 17 knots (31 km/h)
- Range: 8,000 nmi. at 15 knots; (15,000 km at 28 km/h)
- Boats & landing craft carried: 3 × LCT (Mk V or VI); each w/ 5 medium tanks or; 2 × LCT (Mk III or IV); each w/ 12 medium tanks or; 14 × LCM (Mk III); each w/ 1 medium tank; or 1,500 long tons cargo or; 47 × DUKW or; 41 × LVT or; Any combination of landing vehicles and landing craft up to capacity
- Capacity: 22 officers, 218 men
- Complement: 23 officers, 267 men
- Armament: 1 × 5 in / 38 cal. DP gun; 2 × 40 mm quad AA guns; 2 × 40 mm twin AA guns; 16 × 20 mm AA guns

USS Belle Grove (LSD-2) was an Ashland-class dock landing ship of the United States Navy, named in honor of Belle Grove Plantation, the birthplace of President James Madison (1751–1836) in Port Conway, Virginia.

Belle Grove was laid down on 27 October 1942 by the Moore Dry Dock Company, Oakland, California; launched on 17 February 1943, sponsored by Mrs. George M. Lowry; and commissioned at Oakland on 9 August 1943.

== World War II ==
Following her shakedown cruise in the waters off southern California, Belle Grove sailed for Pearl Harbor on 21 October 1943. Upon arrival, the dock landing ship conducted several rehearsals for the upcoming invasion of the Gilbert Islands. In early November, she loaded troops and equipment and set sail for Makin Island. Arriving in the lagoon off Makin on 20 November, she unloaded her embarked troops and LCMs without incident later that morning. In company with Transport Division 20 (TransDiv 20), the ship cleared the island group that evening, returning to Pearl Harbor on 2 December.

=== 1944 ===
Belle Grove underwent repairs and alterations at that base before taking part in amphibious rehearsals at Maalaea Bay, Maui. On 22 January 1944, after embarking troops of the Army's 7th Infantry Division, she sailed for the Marshall Islands. The ship supported the seizure of Kwajalein Atoll, delivering troops and equipment ashore on 31 January, and then served as a floating dry dock and boat pool for the numerous landing craft required in an amphibious operation. These duties lasted until 8 February when she got underway for Pearl Harbor.

With her transport capabilities needed in the Solomons, Belle Grove headed for the Southwestern Pacific on 2 March. After a brief refueling stop at Funafuti in the Ellice Islands, she unloaded troops, vehicles, and other equipment at Guadalcanal. The dock landing ship then took on a cargo of pontoon barges and pilings intended for a motor-torpedo-boat base under construction at Emirau in the Bismarck Archipelago just north of New Ireland. On 25 March, despite heavy seas that wrenched her stern gate from its hinges, the LSD delivered the cargo to that island. After returning to Tulagi for fuel, she proceeded to Espiritu Santo in the New Hebrides for repairs. On 22 April, she steamed to Florida Island to deliver a cargo of landing craft. The ship also carried troops and equipment between Manus Island and the Russell Islands before turning north for Oahu.

Reaching Pearl Harbor on 17 May, Belle Grove began preparations for the upcoming invasion of the Marianas. She embarked troops of the 4th Marine Division and vehicles (LVTs and LVTAs) of the Army's 534th Amphibious Tractor Battalion. She also replaced her own boats with these more efficient landing craft. The ship sailed with TransDiv 26 in early June and arrived off Saipan on the morning of the 15th. Belle Grove disembarked the marines and the LVTs, and sent them shoreward without mishap. As intense fighting continued ashore for several weeks, the dock landing ship served as a floating "garage" to service and fuel the numerous landing craft needed to shuttle vital reinforcements and supplies to the beachhead. Shortages of repair force ratings and machine shop equipment, however, did hamper her repair efforts.

Temporarily assigned to TransDiv 32 on 15 July for the planned occupation of nearby Tinian Island, Belle Grove went alongside SS Dominican Victory on 15 July to load 9,500 rounds of 75-millimeter tank ammunition. Two days later, she received 2,215 five-gallon (20 L) cans of water from Cambria. And on the 22nd, LCMs brought 18 Sherman tanks out to Belle Grove. Two days later, at dawn on the 24th, the dock landing ship arrived off White Beach 2. The ship ballasted down, flooding her well-deck, and lowered her stern gate to launch the tank-carrying landing craft. The operation passed without incident until one LCM's ramp dropped as it went over the sill and it quickly filled with water. Fast work by Belle Grove's deck crew saved both the LCM and its valuable cargo, and the rest of the landing went smoothly.

The dock landing ship returned to Saipan for a second load of LCMs that afternoon and made the trip back to Tinian the following morning. Although mortar fire from shore forced her to retire seaward, Belle Grove resumed unloading cargo late on the 25th. She went to Saipan again in the evening, loaded a third cargo of LCMs, and returned to Tinian the next morning. During the ensuing unloading operation, rough seas caused a water surge in the well deck that slammed several landing craft against the cargo deck. The aftermost LCMs dropped their ramps and filled with water, sinking in the well deck. Salvage work quickly restored the craft to service, however, and the unloading continued without incident. Later that afternoon, DUKWs from the beach came alongside to receive tank ammunition and water, then the ship returned to Saipan. On 28 July, after Belle Grove delivered another cargo of water and ammunition to Tinian, she formed up with TransDiv 7 and began the voyage to Hawaii.

After arriving at Pearl Harbor in mid-August, the dock landing ship received a badly needed hull cleaning and other voyage repairs. Following amphibious exercises off Maui in the first week of September, Belle Grove embarked 20 LCMs, heavy equipment, and Army troops, before sailing on 15 September with TransDiv 28. She paused at Eniwetok from 25 to 28 September to replenish stores and fuel before getting underway for the Admiralties. Arriving at Seeadler Harbor on 3 October, the ship again replenished stores and fuel while both crew and troops went ashore for exercise and recreation. Underway again on the 14th, she set a course for the Philippines.

Belle Grove joined the massive amphibious force off Leyte on 20 October, ballasted down early that morning, and discharged her tank-loaded LCMs as part of the eighth assault wave. She then dispatched her boats to assist other ships in unloading cargo. The ship remained in Leyte Gulf until 22 October when, partly owing to the threat from Japanese surface forces, she departed the area. The dock landing ship reached Hollandia on the 27th and loaded supplies for a return trip to Leyte. Over the next month, she made four more supply runs shuttling from New Guinea to Leyte, before loading three tank landing craft at Sansapor for the invasion of Luzon. Underway 30 December, she joined Task Group 38.5 (TG 78.5) for the journey to Lingayen Gulf.

=== 1945 ===
En route, Belle Grove observed Japanese air attacks on nearby ships, witnessing suicide planes crashing LST-912 and attack transport Callaway on 8 January 1945. The tank landing ship fired at the latter's attackers and claimed hits "though not sufficient to divert the plane and prevent its crash-dive on Callaway. Belle Grove herself escaped the attention of the kamikazes and arrived in Lingayen Gulf early on the 9th. She then anchored and began discharging her LCTs and DUKWs in the rendezvous area. Despite considerable air activity, the dock landing ship remained unscathed and, after a week of operations at Abuyo and San Pedro Bay, proceeded to Ulithi where she arrived on the 23rd.

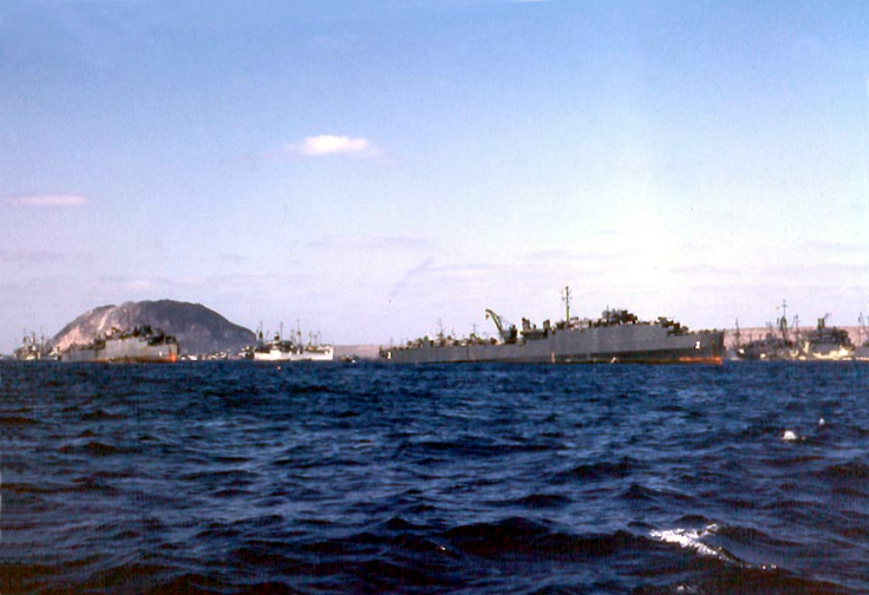
Belle Grove and USS Ashland off Iwo Jima, in 1945.

Assigned to Operation Detachment, the planned invasion of Iwo Jima, the ship steamed to Guam on 7 February, loaded equipment, and shifted to Saipan the following day. She loaded LCMs laden with Marine Corps tanks before sailing for Iwo Jima on the 16th. After unloading her cargo on 19 and 20 February, Belle Grove served as a small craft control and "drydock" vessel in the transport area. She repaired landing craft damaged by both Japanese gunfire and the heavy surf of Iwo Jima's beaches. The ship remained off the island for a month, repairing 199 small craft of all types, before steaming for the Marianas on 20 March. Touching at Guam and Eniwetok, she reached Pearl Harbor on 8 April.

She remained there until 3 June, undergoing repairs and alterations, while a large proportion of her crew were discharged or reassigned. After taking on their replacements, Belle Grove received orders to transport landing craft from the Marshalls and the Marianas to the Philippines. She made two runs to Samar in June and July before turning toward the New Hebrides on 9 August. She reached Espiritu Santo on the 14th and began loading more landing craft. The next day, however, the end of hostilities with Japan interrupted this task. Instead, after departing Espirito Santo on 27 August, the dock landing ship carried passengers and cargo to Hollandia, then to Biak, and on to the Philippines. On 27 September, she departed Leyte for Okinawa, reaching her destination on the 30th.

Although Belle Grove avoided injury in Typhoon Louise, which struck Okinawa in early October, many other ships and small craft suffered severe damage from that storm. The dock landing ship remained in Buckner Bay for almost two months, using her machine shop and well-deck to dock and repair 163 landing craft of all types. Finally released for other duty, the ship embarked replacements for veteran troops in China and steamed for Shanghai on 23 November. Lingering in that port for only three days, Belle Grove sailed down the coast to Hong Kong for rest and recreation before streaming the "Homeward Bound" pennant on 6 December. After refueling stops at Samar and Eniwetok, the LSD reached San Diego on New Year's Day 1946. The ship then underwent a preservation overhaul before being decommissioned on 30 August 1946. She was berthed with the Pacific Reserve Fleet at San Diego.

== 1950 – 1952 ==
The outbreak of hostilities in Korea in June 1950 prompted the dock landing ship's return to service. Ordered activated on 7 August 1950, Belle Grove was recommissioned at San Diego on 27 December 1950. Upon completion of her shakedown training, she departed San Diego on 16 April 1951, transited the Panama Canal two weeks later, and reached Norfolk on 4 May. The LSD participated in several amphibious exercises that summer before proceeding to Baltimore, Maryland, where she remained in overhaul from 28 June and 29 September. Following those repairs, Belle Grove returned to Norfolk on 1 October. She sailed for the West Indies on the 11th, visiting Bermuda and Puerto Rico and then conducting training operations off Vieques Island until 5 November. After additional training off Onslow Beach, N.C., the ship returned to Norfolk on 18 November and remained in port through the end of the year.

On 7 January 1952, Belle Grove departed Norfolk for her first tour of duty with the 6th Fleet in the Mediterranean. During the course of her deployment, as part of TransDiv 33, the ship visited Italy, Crete, and Sardinia and participated in NATO Exercise "Grand Slam." She wound up her deployment with visits to Beirut, Lebanon, late in April and to Cannes, France, early in May. Departing southern France on the 8th, the ship returned across the Atlantic, arriving at Morehead City, N.C., to drop off marines on 22 May. She then resumed operations with 2d Fleet, carrying out amphibious training off Virginia and the Carolinas into September. Ranging farther afield, Belle Grove also shuttled troops and equipment between Norfolk, Morehead City, and Vieques. She stopped at Trujillo, Dominican Republic, between 2 and 5 November, and at Newport, Rhode Island, on 1 and 2 December, before returning to her home port for the holidays on the 4th.

== 1953 – 1955 ==
Departing Norfolk on 6 January 1953, Belle Grove proceeded to Charleston, South Carolina, for repairs and alterations. During that overhaul, which lasted until 26 March, she received word of her impending reassignment to the Pacific Fleet. After post-overhaul refresher training at Guantánamo Bay, Cuba, the ship headed for Panama in mid-April. She transited the canal on 20 April and reached San Diego on 1 May. Three days later, she put to sea for Operation "Barchange", an Arctic supply mission to support the embryonic continental defense systems being constructed in Alaska. She stopped at Seattle to load equipment and supplies before sailing for the Aleutians on 12 May. Belle Grove shuttled between Seattle and Alaskan locales such as Cold Bay, Naknek, Kodiak, Unimak, and Barrow, through mid-September 1953. Departing Seattle on 22 September, she reached San Diego on the 26th, and remained there into the following year undergoing repairs and receiving the modifications necessary for operations in a radiation-contaminated environment.

On 2 January 1954, the dock landing ship sailed for Pearl Harbor in preparation for Operation Castle, a six-detonation atmospheric nuclear test slated to occur at Bikini and Eniwetok atolls in the Marshall Islands. Arriving at Bikini Atoll on 19 January, Belle Grove resumed the familiar role of transport and "mother" ship to a boat pool of 26 small craft. In addition, before each test, the ship evacuated people and boats from the test sites. Following each test, she quickly returned to the lagoon to enable LCM decontamination and recovery operations to proceed as soon as possible. The first five thermonuclear detonations occurred at Bikini between 1 March and 5 May, and the last one took place on 14 May at Eniwetok.

On 17 May, Belle Grove sailed for home and, after stopping briefly at Pearl Harbor on the 26th, moored at San Diego on 3 June. Following three months of upkeep and training, the ship got underway for the central Pacific on 26 September. Arriving at Kwajalein on 6 October, she spent the next two weeks shuttling supplies and equipment among the Marshalls before sailing for Guam. From there, the ship proceeded to Sangley Point in the Philippines, delivered cargo, and then set sail for home on the 30th. Steaming via Eniwetok, Midway, and Astoria, Oreg., she arrived at San Diego on 23 November.

On 11 January 1955, Belle Grove entered Long Beach Naval Shipyard for an overhaul and remained there until 27 April. Following a short period of refresher training, the ship departed Long Beach for Seattle on 9 May. Intelligence suggesting an increase in the Soviet long-range bomber threat had accelerated air defense and early warning system construction in Alaska, and the dock landing ship received another resupply mission to those Arctic outposts. Over the next five months, she shuttled between Seattle and the Alaskan ports of Anchorage, Kodiak, Naknek, Cape Newenham, Northeast Cape, Nome, Tin City, Cape Beaufort, Cape Lisburne, and Point Barrow. At one point, just before a change of command ceremony, the ship encountered such severe ice conditions that the new captain had to utilize an Inuit "skin-boat" to cross the harbor to board ship. Returning to Long Beach on 2 October, she spent a short time in the shipyard to repair damage sustained in the Bering Sea ice pack but soon resumed the underway training off southern California that occupied her time for the remainder of the year.

== 1956 – 1961 ==
Belle Grove commenced her first postwar deployment to the Far East when she stood out of Long Beach on 12 January 1956. The dock landing ship reached Yokosuka on 3 February, and over the next seven months, operated with 7th Fleet forces in Japanese, Korean, and Philippine waters. She also visited Keelung, Formosa; Hong Kong; and Okinawa. High tensions with China marked this cruise, especially since the communists threatened Formosa with invasion at this time, but no incidents occurred and the ship departed for home on 8 September. She arrived at Long Beach, via Eniwetok, Johnston Island, and Pearl Harbor, on 4 October and spent the rest of the year in port.

Local operations along the coast of southern California occupied her time throughout 1957 and the first few months of 1958. On 1 April, Belle Grove departed Long Beach for the central Pacific. She spent the next five months participating in Operation Hardtack I, a 35-detonation series of nuclear tests held at Eniwetok, Bikini, and Johnston Island. After she arrived at Eniwetok on 20 April, her activities involved shuttling LCUs and other cargo among the atolls and Johnston Island in support of boat pool activities. On 10 June, following the first 14 nuclear tests, the ship steamed to Pearl Harbor for upkeep before returning for a second tour of duty in mid-July. She assisted in six more surface tests and in two high-altitude Redstone rocket detonations off Johnston Island, before assisting in roll-up activities at Eniwetok into early September. The ship returned to Long Beach on the 23rd and then limited her activities to local operations for the balance of the year. She was in dry dock at Hunter's Point in San Francisco Bay October through December.

Over the next 18 months, Belle Grove made two more deployments to the western Pacific. There, she operated with 7th Fleet units in the familiar waters off Taiwan, South Korea, and Japan. In mid-1960, after returning to the West Coast following her third postwar assignment in the Orient, she began an overhaul at the Todd Shipyard at San Pedro, California Departing that yard on 11 January 1961, the dock landing ship conducted post-overhaul refresher training and local operations out of Long Beach into the summer.

In late June, Belle Grove sailed for Portland, Oreg., and a Fleet Rehabilitation and Modernization (FRAM) overhaul. Her crew lived on board the barracks ship APL-4 while the dock landing ship underwent a thorough reconditioning. She received new mess facilities, modern communications equipment, and much needed maintenance to her engineering spaces, hull, and well-deck. With the overhaul completed in late December, the ship returned to Long Beach on the 29th.

== 1962 ==
Following refresher training in January 1962, Belle Grove sailed for another Pacific deployment on 15 February. During the first three months of the deployment, she shuttled marines and their equipment between Subic Bay and Okinawa. She also participated in Operation Tulungan, a multi-lateral Southeast Asia Treaty Organization (SEATO) exercise held in the Philippines and designed to deter communist aggression in the region. In May, continued political friction between the communist Pathet Lao and rightist factions in Laos, prompted President John F. Kennedy to order American military forces into neighboring Thailand. That move, symbolizing the American commitment to support the Thai and South Vietnamese governments, began when an attack carrier group steamed into position off Da Nang, South Vietnam. An amphibious ready group (ARG) then proceeded into the Gulf of Siam, and all available amphibious ships assembled in Buckner Bay, Okinawa.

Belle Grove and Talladega supported this contingency operation by lifting the 1st Battalion, 9th Marines, and six helicopters to Subic Bay. When the International Agreement on the Neutrality of Laos was signed on 23 July 1962, the Laotian crisis abated, and the ship received orders to help remove the Marines of the 3rd Marine Amphibious Unit (MAU) and their equipment from Thailand. Belle Grove, and her sister ship Carter Hall, made two trips to Bangkok, Thailand, before completing this task in early August. After dropping off marines at Subic Bay and Buckner Bay, the ship stopped at Yokosuka, Japan for minor repairs before departing for home on 23 August. She arrived at Long Beach on 11 September.

At the end of a month of leave and upkeep, the ship received emergency orders to load elements of the 5th Marine Expeditionary Brigade at Camp Del Mar. The gradual rise in tension between the United States and Cuba, exacerbated by the Soviet Union's delivery of military assistance to that island, had broken out into a severe crisis on 14 October. A U-2 reconnaissance flight, initially described as "a milk run", detected the presence of offensive nuclear weapon sites on Cuba and prompted President John F. Kennedy to order a naval "quarantine" of the island. Belle Grove, in company with three other dock landing ships, transited the Panama Canal on 5 November and took up station south of Jamaica. Although the immediate crisis passed by 28 October, the ship steamed with elements of Task Group 128 (TG 128) for another three weeks as the withdrawal of Soviet missiles from Cuba was confirmed. She departed the West Indies on 2 December and arrived at Long Beach on the 15th in time to enjoy the holiday season in port.

== 1963 – 1965 ==
For the next ten months, Belle Grove conducted local operations off the West Coast. On 17 September 1963, the dock landing ship sailed from Long Beach for her fifth Far East deployment. She visited Hawaii, Yokosuka, Sasebo, and Hong Kong before anchoring in Subic Bay as standby LSD for TG 76.5 in December. A faulty boiler, however, kept her in port for repairs until 1 February 1964, when she resumed operations with 7th Fleet. Belle Grove participated in amphibious Exercise "Back Pack" at Taiwan and then visited Okinawa and Japan before returning to Long Beach on 6 April.

In mid-July, after a period of local operations, the ship moved to Seattle, Washington, where she entered the Todd Shipyard for another modernization overhaul to repair her aging hull, piping systems, and cabling. Returning to Long Beach in mid-October, she conducted refresher training and local operations into the following spring. On 19 April 1965, Belle Grove headed westw for service in South Vietnam. She transported a portion of the Republic of Korea Army Tiger Division to Vietnam. The ship then supported the recent marine deployment to Da Nang by serving as a boat haven in that city's harbor. In addition, she provided repair facilities to inshore coastal vessels engaged in Operation Market Time, a series of coastal patrols designed to interdict communist waterborne logistics routes into South Vietnam. Returning home 29 November, she spent only six weeks in leave and upkeep before heading back to Vietnam.

== 1966 – 1968 ==
Assigned the task of establishing river patrol units in the Mekong Delta, Belle Grove steamed for Vung Tau, South Vietnam, on 10 January 1966. Arriving in that port on 5 February, the ship spent the next two months maintaining LCM landing craft, PBR river patrol boats, and UH-1B "Huey" helicopters in the Rung Sat Special Zone. She also served as a command center that coordinated Navy riverine patrols and Army helicopter sweeps against Viet Cong (VC) forces as part of Operation Jackstay. Those attacks, carried out in conjunction with B-52 strikes, lasted from 26 March to 4 April. In mid-April, she coordinated the first PBR and helicopter patrols on the Long Tau River. On 19 April, USS Tortuga, relieved her as armed-helo support ship at Vung Tau, and Belle Grove steamed for the Philippines that same day. After delivering cargo to Subic Bay the ship returned home, via Yokosuka and Pearl Harbor, on 28 May.

Following a short period of local operations, during which she was transferred to Amphibious Squadron 11 (Phibron 11) on 1 July, Belle Grove sailed for another Far East tour on 1 September. On 24 September, she successfully weathered Typhoon Ida before putting into Okinawa. There, she joined TF 76, 7th Fleet's amphibious force, and began carrying troops and equipment throughout the Far East. Belle Grove transported cargo between Da Nang and Vung Tau, both in South Vietnam; Sasebo, Yokosuka, and Numazu, Japan; Okinawa; and Subic Bay, Philippines. She also delivered the bulk-fuel system for the base at Sattahip on the Gulf of Siam. Heading home in December, the ship suffered a delay in Pearl Harbor owing to boiler problems but finally arrived at Long Beach on 10 January 1967.

For the next eight months, Belle Grove conducted refresher and amphibious training in the waters off California. She broke this routine only twice, once in March and again in April, to participate in exercises near Kaneohe and Molokai, Hawaii. On 11 August, the ship once again headed to Vietnam. After unloading equipment at Subic Bay on the 27th, the dock landing ship received orders to Da Nang on 5 September. There, she relieved USS Hermitage and, the next day, joined TG 76.4 at sea. Over the next ten weeks, the LSD took part in three amphibious assaults in support of I Corps operations. The ship launched combat loaded LVTs, refueled and maintained helicopters, and provided base support for troops of the Army's Special Forces. In late November, she made several equipment deliveries between Subic Bay, Da Nang and Cam Ranh Bay, at the conclusion of which she returned to the Philippines before heading for Sasebo on 3 December. The next day she was diverted to assist a grounded Japanese fishing boat, the Kiyu Maru, and rescued the entire crew. After a week of upkeep in Sasebo, Belle Grove steamed into Naha, Okinawa, on the 17th. There she loaded CH-46 helicopters and related equipment for transportation to Da Nang. These she transported in two trips, making the first delivery on 22 December and the second on 2 January 1968. In both cases, a lack of pier space inspired the crew to demonstrate Belle Grove's versatility by assembling the crated helicopters in her well-deck and flying them off while she lay anchored in the harbor.

For the next month, the ship conducted further equipment deliveries – between Subic Bay, Manila, and Cam Ranh Bay – before steaming to Yokosuka on 8 February. Following upkeep and inspection, Belle Grove got underway for home on the 28th, stopped at Pearl Harbor on 9 and 10 March, and arrived at Long Beach on 19 March. Leave and upkeep lasted until 10 April when the ship began an overhaul at the Long Beach Naval Shipyard. After repairs ended on 14 July, the ship spent the next four months conducting refresher training and underway exercises out of San Diego. On 9 October she sailed for a port visit to Acapulco and, on the 25th, loaded several yachts of the victorious U.S. Olympic yachting team for transport back to San Diego. After unloading the sailing vessels on 1 November, Belle Grove moved to Long Beach where she spent the remainder of the year conducting local operations.

== 1969 ==
In January 1969, Belle Grove moved to the Bethlehem Steel Shipyard, San Pedro, for an availability that lasted until the 27th. After a brief return to Long Beach, the ship steamed for Pearl Harbor on 30 January. Arriving at Oahu on 7 February, the dock landing ship moored at the naval ammunition depot where she loaded dynamite and other explosives for the Atomic Energy Commission. Underway for Johnston Atoll on the morning of the 9th, the ship reached her destination on the 11th and worked cargo until sailing for the Marshall Islands the following morning. Entering the lagoon at Bikini Atoll on the morning of the 18th, Belle Grove commenced unloading explosives and other test equipment. Departing the atoll for Guam late that afternoon, the ship put into Apra Harbor on the 23rd but departed again that same day and arrived at Subic Bay on the 28th.

For the next five months, Belle Grove shuttled men and material between Da Nang, Vung Tau, Subic Bay and Okinawa, punctuating those lifts with short visits to Singapore, Hong Kong, and Sasebo. When in Vietnamese waters, the ship often put into effect the "exposed anchorage and antiswimmer watch" to foil any Viet Cong attempts to attach limpet mines to her hull. This sometimes included the use of an armed picket boat patrolling around the ship and tossing grenades in the water. Her only amphibious operation took place in early August, when Belle Grove helped shift marines and their equipment from Chu Lai to Da Nang.

Departing Vung Tau for the last time on 14 August, she reached Buckner Bay on the 17th, pushed on for Yokosuka the following afternoon, and moored there on the 21st. Five days later, the ship departed Japanese waters and arrived at Seal Beach, California, on 11 September. Slated for inactivation, the dock landing ship unloaded all her ammunition before shifting to Long Beach the following day. Belle Grove was decommissioned on 12 November 1969, and her name was struck from the Naval Vessel Register that same day. She was placed in the Inactive Ship Facility, San Diego, where she remained into 1970. That summer she was sold to N. W. Kennedy of Vancouver, British Columbia, Canada, and broken up for scrap.

Belle Grove earned six battle stars for World War II service and eight battle stars for Vietnam War service.
