= USS Garrett County =

Tank landing ship of the United States Navy

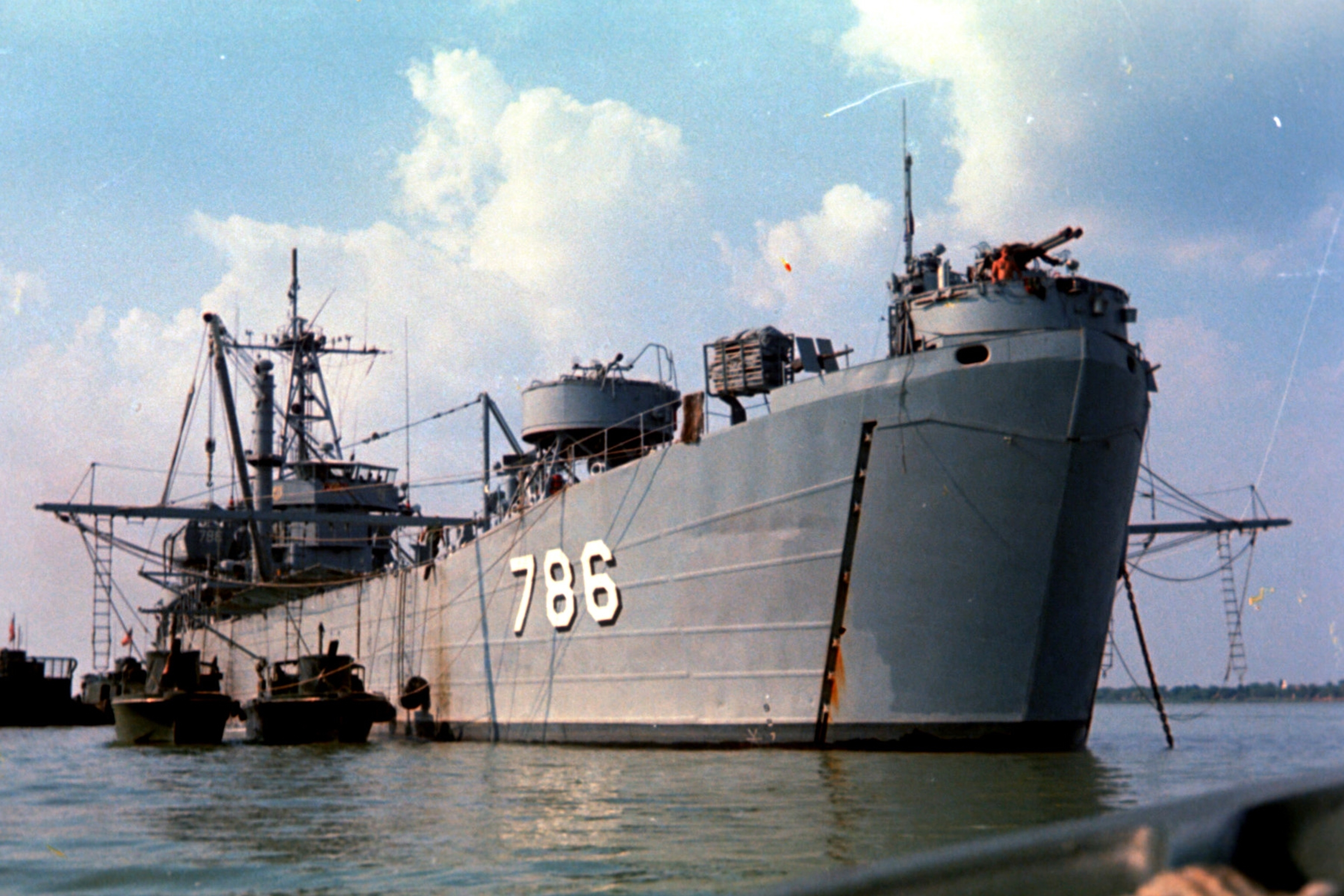
- USS Garrett County anchored in the Mekong Delta, 1968

History

United States
- Name: USS LST-786
- Namesake: Garrett County, Maryland
- Builder: Dravo Corporation, Pittsburgh, Pennsylvania
- Laid down: 21 May 1944
- Launched: 22 July 1944
- Commissioned: 28 August 1944
- Decommissioned: 9 July 1946
- Renamed: USS Garrett County (LST-786), 1 July 1955
- Recommissioned: 15 October 1966
- Decommissioned: 23 April 1971
- Reclassified: AGP-786 (Patrol Craft Tender), October 1966
- Honours and awards: 1 battle star (World War II); 8 battle stars, Presidential Unit Citation & Navy Unit Commendation (Vietnam)
- Fate: Transferred to South Vietnam, 23 April 1971

Vietnam
- Name: RVNS Can Tho (HQ-801)
- Acquired: 23 April 1971
- Fate: Transferred to the Republic of the Philippines, 1973

Philippines
- Name: BRP Kalinga Apayao (LT-516)
- Acquired: 1973
- Decommissioned: September 2010
- Fate: Scrapped in 2012.

General characteristics
- Class & type: LST-542-class tank landing ship
- Displacement: 1,625 long tons (1,651 t) light; 4,080 long tons (4,145 t) full
- Length: 328 ft (100 m)
- Beam: 50 ft (15 m)
- Draft: Unloaded : 2 ft 4 in (0.71 m) forward; 7 ft 6 in (2.29 m) aft; Loaded : 8 ft 2 in (2.49 m) forward; 14 ft 1 in (4.29 m) aft
- Propulsion: 2 × General Motors 12-567 diesel engines, two shafts, twin rudders
- Speed: 12 knots (22 km/h; 14 mph)
- Boats & landing craft carried: 2 LCVPs
- Troops: 16 officers, 147 enlisted men
- Complement: 7 officers, 104 enlisted men
- Armament: 1 × single 3"/50 caliber gun mount; 8 × 40 mm guns; 12 × 20 mm guns

USS Garrett County (LST-786) was an LST-542-class tank landing ship built for the United States Navy during World War II. Named after Garrett County, Maryland (/ɡərɛt/), she was the only U.S. Naval vessel to bear the name.

== Service history ==
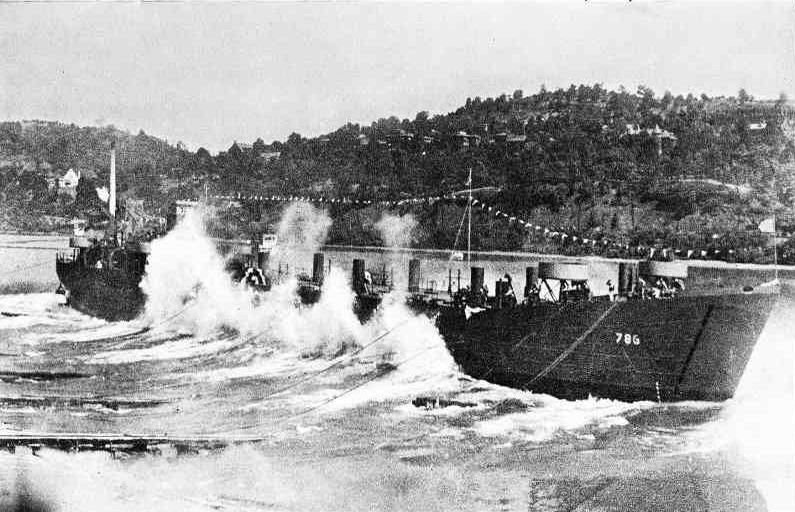
LST-786 launching, 22 July 1944 at Dravo Corporation, Neville Island, Pittsburgh, Pennsylvania.

LST-786 was laid down on 21 May 1944 at Pittsburgh, Pennsylvania by the Dravo Corporation; launched on 22 July 1944; sponsored by Mrs. E. B. Keckler; and commissioned on 28 August 1944.

=== World War II, 1944–1946 ===
During World War II, LST-786 was assigned to the Asiatic-Pacific theater and participated in the assault and occupation of Iwo Jima from 12 to 28 February 1945, and the assault and occupation of Okinawa Gunto in May and June 1945. Following the war, she performed occupation duty in the Far East and saw service in China until mid-December 1945. LST-786 was decommissioned on 9 July 1946 at Astoria, Oregon and assigned to the Columbia River Group of the Pacific Reserve Fleet. On 1 July 1955 the ship was redesignated USS Garrett County (LST-786).

=== Vietnam War, 1966–1971 ===
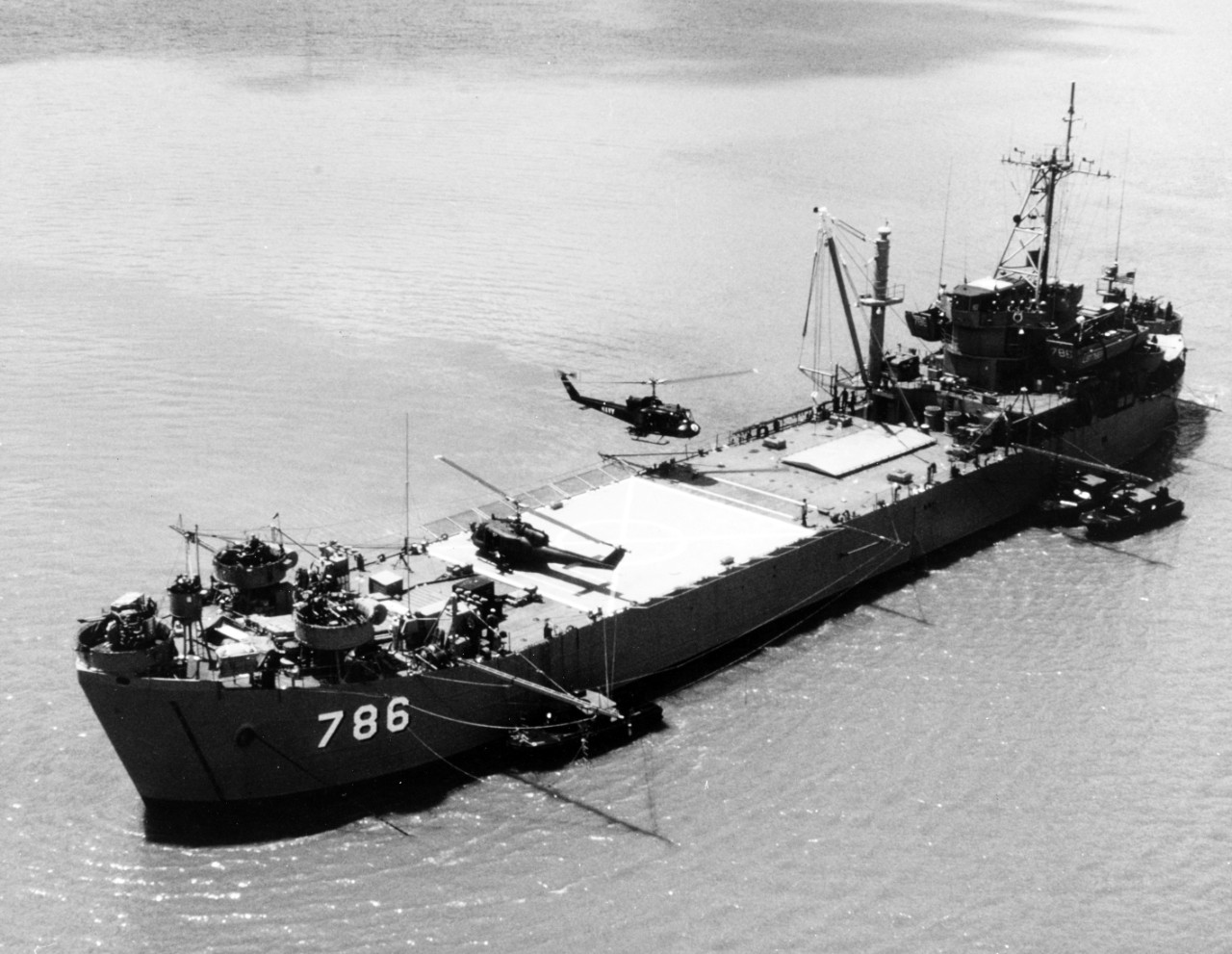
USS Garrett County (LST-786) in the Co Chien River, Mekong Delta

Recommissioned on 15 October 1966 at Mare Island Naval Shipyard. Garrett County saw extensive service during the Vietnam War, operating as part of Operation Game Warden, a brown-water navy effort to keep the rivers free of Viet Cong infiltration. Four LSTs were recommissioned to support river patrol operations with the intent of keeping three ships on-station at any one time supporting a River Division of 10 Patrol Boat, River, a Detachment of 2 UH-1 Helicopter Gunships of HC-1, later HAL-3 Seawolves and a SEAL Platoon. The ship not on-station was undergoing ship repairs in the Western Pacific. Garrett County reported on-station to CTF 116 on 12 March 1967 and operated as a Patrol Craft Tender (AGP) for the next 48 months on the rivers of the Mekong Delta.

The ship participated in the following campaigns: Vietnamese Counteroffensive - Phase III (29 November 1967 to 29 January 1968); Tet Counteroffensive (30 January to 1 April 1968); Vietnamese Counteroffensive - Phase IV (2 April to 30 June 1968); Vietnamese Counteroffensive - Phase V (1 July to 1 November 1968); Vietnamese Counteroffensive - Phase VI (2 November to 2 December 1968 and 23 January 1969); Tet/69 Counteroffensive (28 February to 8 June 1969); Vietnam Summer-Fall 1969 (9 June to 11 August 1969, 7 September 1969, and 31 December 1969 to 21 February 1970); and Vietnamese Counteroffensive - Phase VII (1 September 1970, 5 to 30 November 1970, and 31 December 1970 to 2 February 1971).

LST-786 earned one battle star for World War II service, and two Presidential Unit Citation, two Navy Unit Commendation, and eight battle stars for the Vietnam War.

=== Republic of Vietnam and Philippine Navy ===
Decommissioned and transferred to South Vietnam for service in the Republic of Vietnam Navy on 23 April 1971, she was renamed RVNS Can Tho (HQ-801). The ship and her crew escaped to the Philippines during the fall of the South Vietnamese government, after which custody was transferred to the Republic of the Philippines. She was renamed BRP Kalinga Apayao (LT-516) for service in the Philippine Navy.

She was decommissioned in September 2010 and was reportedly scrapped at Naval Base Cavite in 2012.
