= Operation Sealords =

Part of the Vietnam War (1968–1971)

- Part of the Vietnam War
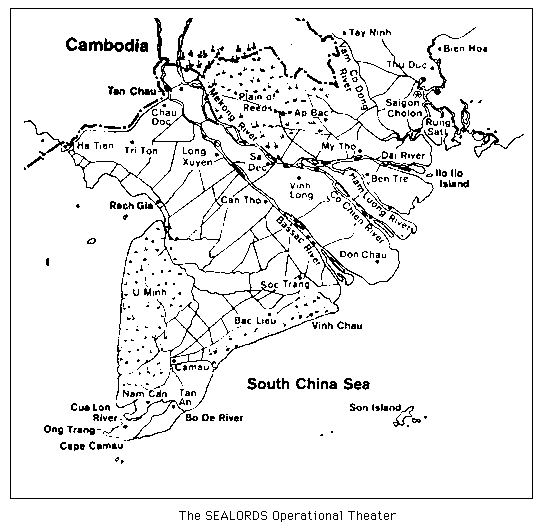
Date	1968–1971
Location	South Vietnam
Result	Successful disruption of Viet Cong supply and communication lines.

Belligerents
South Vietnam; United States	Viet Cong

Operation Sealords was a military operation that took place during the Vietnam War.

== SEALORDS acronym ==
SEALORDS is an acronym for Southeast Asia Lake, Ocean, River, and Delta Strategy. It was a joint operation between United States and South Vietnamese forces which was conceived by Elmo R. Zumwalt, Jr., Commander, Naval Forces Vietnam (COMNAVFORV), and it was intended to disrupt North Vietnamese supply lines from Cambodia in and around the Mekong Delta. As a two-year operation, by 1971 all aspects of Sealords had been turned over to the Republic of Vietnam Navy (RVNN).

== Responsibilities ==
As American forces prepared the South Vietnamese military to assume complete responsibility for the war under the Nixon Administrations Vietnamization policy, they also worked to keep pressure on the enemy. Due to the successes of Operation Market Time and Operation Game Warden; one of the few places left for the North Vietnamese to smuggle troops and supplies into the Mekong Delta was through the rivers, canals and lakes that were near the Cambodian border.

The Navy in particular spearheaded a drive in the Mekong Delta to isolate and destroy the weakened Communist forces. The Sealords program was a determined effort by the U.S. Navy and the RVNN in conjunction with the U.S. 9th Infantry Division's Riverine Forces, the Army of the Republic of South Vietnam and the South Vietnamese Marine Division. The objectives of the Sealords operation sought to cut enemy supply lines from Cambodia and disrupt operations at their base areas deep in the delta. The operation, soon designated as Task Force 194, was developed by Vice Admiral Elmo R. Zumwalt, Jr. who appointed it to COMNAVFORV in September 1968.

== Launching of Sealords ==
Admiral Zumwalt officially launched Sealords on 5 November 1968 in the issuance of Operation Plan 111-69 with the blessing of the new COMUSMACV (Commander of US Military Assistance Command Vietnam), General Creighton Abrams. At that time, Allied naval forces in South Vietnam were at peak strength. The U.S. Navy's Coastal Surveillance Force operated 81 Patrol Craft Fast (PCF)s, 26 U.S. Coast Guard Point-class cutters, and 39 other vessels. The River Patrol Force deployed 258 patrol and minesweeping boats; the 3,700-man Riverine Assault Force counted 184 monitors, transports and other armored craft. Helicopter Attack Squadron (Light) 3 flew 25 armed helicopters. This air component was soon augmented by the 15 fixed-wing OV-10 Bronco aircraft of Attack Squadron Light (VAL) 4, activated in April 1969. In addition, five SEAL platoons supported operations in the delta. In total, Sealords employed 586 American vessels of the Coastal Surveillance Force (Task Force 115: "Operation Market Time"), the River Patrol Force (TF 116: "Game Warden"), and the Mobile Riverine Assault Force (TF 117). Complementing the American naval contingent were the RVNN's 655 ships, assault craft, patrol boats and other vessels. To focus the allied effort on the Sealords campaign, COMNAVFORV appointed his deputy, Rear Admiral William Hiram House, USN, the operational commander, or "First Sealord," of the newly activated Task Force 194 in December 1968. Although continuing to function, the Game Warden, Market Time and Riverine Assault Force operations were scaled down and their personnel and material resources increasingly devoted to Sealords. PCFs, because of their shallow drafts and limited capacity for off-shore operations were tasked for incursions up rivers and canals, while the Coast Guard's Point-class cutters were assigned coastal areas previously assigned to the PCFs. Task Force 115 PCFs mounted lightning raids into enemy-held coastal waterways and took over patrol responsibility for the delta's larger rivers. This freed the PBRs for operations along the previously uncontested smaller rivers and canals. These incursions into former Vietcong bastions were possible only with the on-call support of naval aircraft and the heavily armed riverine assault craft.

== Operations ==
In the first phase of the Sealords campaign allied forces established patrol "barriers," often using electronic sensor devices, along the waterways paralleling the Cambodian border. In early November 1968, PBRs and riverine assault craft opened two canals between the Gulf of Siam at Rach Gia and the Bassac River at Long Xuyen. South Vietnamese paramilitary ground troops helped naval patrol units secure the transportation routes in this operational area, soon named Search Turn. Later in the month, Swift boats, PBRs, riverine assault craft, and Vietnamese naval vessels penetrated the Giang Thanh-Vinh Te canal system and established patrols along the waterway from Hà Tiên on the gulf to Châu Đốc on the upper Bassac. As a symbol of the Vietnamese contribution to the combined effort, the allied command changed the name of this operation from Foul Deck to Tran Hung Dao I. Then in December American naval forces pushed up the Vàm Cỏ Đông and Vàm Cỏ Tây Rivers west of Saigon, against heavy enemy opposition, to cut infiltration routes from the "Parrot's Beak" area of Cambodia. Operation Giant Slingshot, so named for the configuration of the two rivers, severely hampered Communist resupply in the region near the capital and in the Plain of Reeds. Completing the first phase of the Sealords program, in January 1969 PBRs, Assault Support Patrol Boats (ASPB), and other river craft established patrol sectors along canals westward from the Vàm Cỏ Tây to the Mekong River in Operation Barrier Reef. Thus, by early 1969 a patrolled waterway interdiction barrier extended almost uninterrupted from Tay Ninh Province northwest of Saigon to the Gulf of Siam.

Further operations would be carried out on the Cua Dai and Hoi An Rivers in Quang Nam Province in I Corps, on the Saigon River as far north as Dau Tieng Base Camp in the Michelin Rubber Plantation in III Corps and on the Ca Mau Peninsula waterways in IV Corps. During the Cambodian Incursion in May 1970, Sealords task forces sailed up the Mekong River, crossing the Cambodian border, with forces reaching as far upriver as the capital of Phnom Penh. Since Operation Sealords was designated as a part of the U.S. military's Vietnamization program, in February 1969 the U.S. Navy began handing over nearly 250 patrol craft and 500 motorized junks, formerly part of Task Forces 116 and 117, to the RVNN. Virtually all of these watercraft were captured by the People's Army of Vietnam in 1975. The U.S. Navy's role in Sealords officially ceased in April 1971 and became the complete responsibility of the RVNN.

== See also ==
- Lists of allied military operations of the Vietnam War
- Operation Game Warden
- Operation Market Time
- Mobile Riverine Force

== Notes ==
=== References cited ===
- Berman, Larry (2012). Zumwalt: The Life and Times of Admiral Elmo Russell "Bud" Zumwalt, Jr. Annapolis, Maryland: Naval Institute Press. ISBN 978-1-59114-169-3.
- Cutler, Thomas J. (1988). Brown Water, Black Berets. Annapolis, MD: United States Naval Institute. ISBN 0-87021-011-4. OCLC 17299589.
- Larzelere, Alex (1997). The Coast Guard at War, Vietnam, 1965–1975. Annapolis, Maryland: Naval Institute Press. ISBN 978-1-55750-529-3.
- Olson, James S. (2008). In Country: The Illustrated Encyclopedia of the Vietnam War. New York: Metro Books. ISBN 978-1-4351-1184-4. OCLC 317495523.
- Summers, Harry G. Jr. (1985). The Vietnam War Almanac. New York: Random House. ISBN 0-7394-4290-2. OCLC 9730994.
