= U.S. Navy and U.S. Marine Corps Aircraft Squadron Designations =

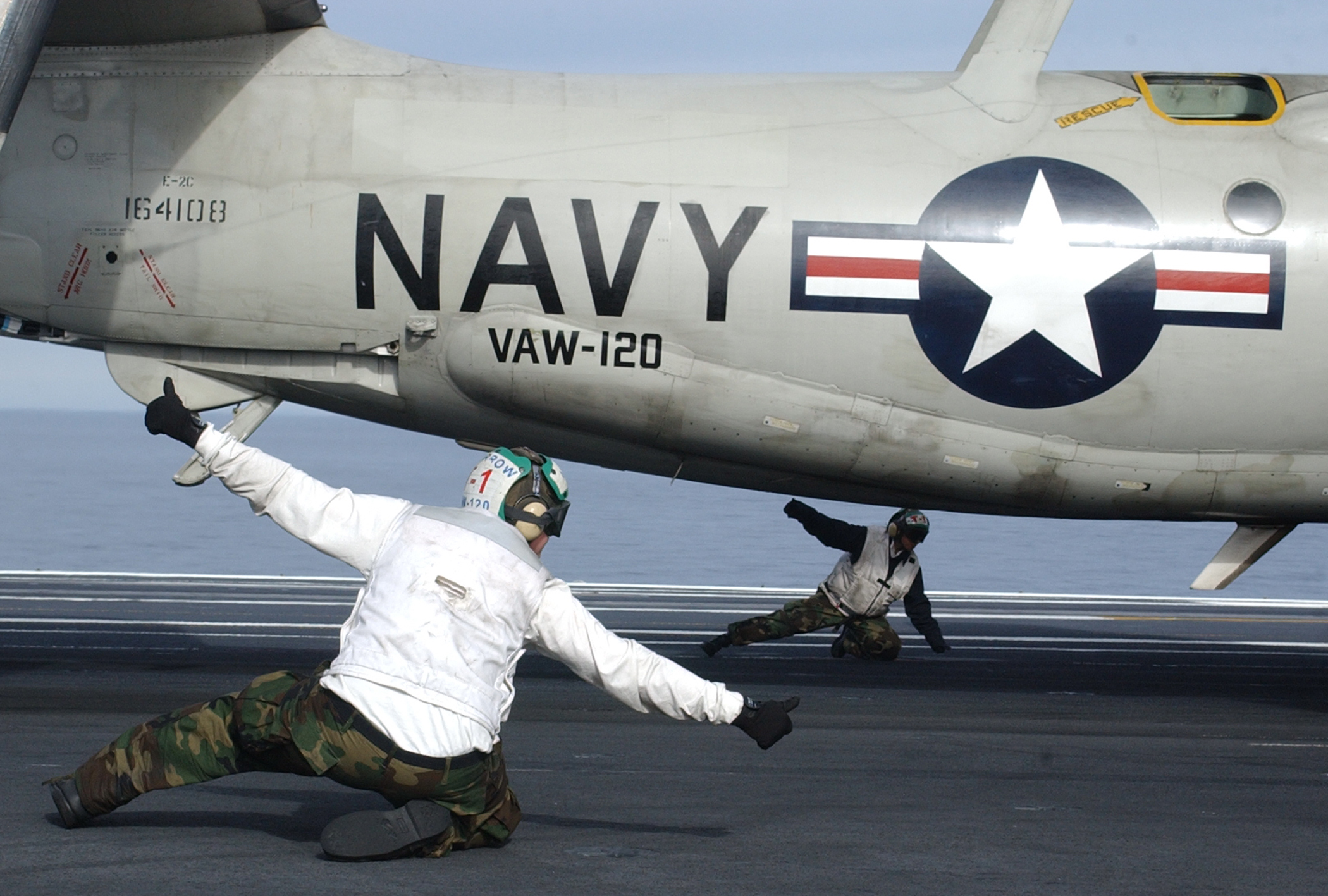
VAW-120, designation for the Carrier Airborne Early Warning Squadron 120, is prominently displayed on this E-2C Hawkeye.

The U.S. Navy and U.S. Marine Corps have a well-defined set of principles that govern the designations given to their aircraft squadrons. This designation system was introduced in 1922 and, although there have been changes and additions to it over time, the system as a whole is still in use to present day.

== Basic Principles ==
The U.S. Navy and U.S. Marine Corps squadron designation comprises a combination of letters and numerals, each having a precise meaning. From left to right, the designation includes the following three components:

- First letter signifies the type of equipment used by the squadron, where
  - V stands for fixed-wing aircraft (originally – heavier-than-air)
  - Z is for lighter-than-Air craft, and
  - H is for rotorcraft (helicopters)
- Subsequent letters (one or several), known as "class letters", indicate the primary mission of the squadron.
- Finally, a numeral, preceded by a dash, is the unique number of the squadron within its class.

Thus, for example, VP-1 is the designator for Patrol Squadron One, where the "V" stands for Heavier-than-Air and the class letter "P" stands for Patrol, while ZP-1 is the designator for Airship Patrol Squadron One, with the "Z" indicating Lighter-than-Air.

Two or more class letters may follow the "V". In such designators the following letters usually narrow down the class specified by the preceding one: for example, VAH-1 stands for Heavy Attack Squadron One. There are exceptions to this rule, however. In a designation like VAW-123, the "AW" is to be treated as an unbreakable combination that signifies Airborne Early Warning and has nothing to do with "A" for Attack.

What follows is a list of designations that have been used or are in use by actual squadrons of the U.S. Navy and U.S. Marine Corps.

== U.S. Navy - List of Fixed Wing Squadron Designations ==
Designator	Full Name	Notes
VA	Attack Squadron	This designation first came into use in 1945, with carrier-based bomber (VB) and torpedo bomber (VT) squadrons being re-classified as attack squadrons. It was discontinued with the retirement of the Grumman A-6 Intruder in 1997.
VA(AW)	All Weather Attack Squadron	The Navy employed this designator for squadrons equipped with all-weather variants of the Douglas AD Skyraider. It was discontinued with the demise of the wide-body Skyraiders from the Navy inventory, and squadrons equipped with newer all-weather attack aircraft such as Grumman A-6 Intruder received "plain" VA designators.
VAH	Heavy Attack Squadron	This designator was first given in the 1950s to former composite (VC) squadrons flying the North American AJ Savage. VAH squadrons existed until the early 1970s.
VA(HM)	Heavy Attack (Mining) Squadron	The Navy employed this designator in the 1950s for a very small number of Lockheed P2V Neptune units specifically tasked with minelaying duties.
VAK	Tactical Aerial Refueling Squadron	This designator was only used for a very short time by a small number of reserve units flying the Douglas KA-3B Skywarrior tanker variant. The majority of squadrons flying the KA-3B tankers did so while still being designated Heavy Attack Squadrons, and squadrons flying other types of tanker-capable aircraft such as the Grumman KA-6D Intruder did so without any change in designation.
VAL	Light Attack Squadron	Only one squadron has ever carried this designation, VAL-4 flying the North American OV-10 Bronco aircraft between 1969 and 1972.
VAP	Heavy Photographic Squadron	This designator was instituted in the early 1950s for photo-reconnaissance squadrons equipped with heavy carrier-capable aircraft such as the North American AJ-2P Savage. It was discontinued with the demise of the last photo reconnaissance Douglas RA-3B Skywarriors in the early 1970s.
VAQ	Tactical Electronic Warfare Squadron	This designator was instituted upon the introduction of the Douglas EKA-3B Skywarrior variant in the late 1960s. Before that, dedicated electronic warfare assets have been part of composite (VC) or early warning (VAW) squadrons.
VAQ	Electronic Attack Squadron	In early 1998 the VAQ designation was changed from "Tactical Electronic Warfare Squadron" to "Electronic Attack Squadron".
VAW	Carrier Airborne Early Warning Squadron	This designator was first given in the late 1950s to former composite (VC) squadrons flying the Douglas AD-5W Skyraider. Since then all airborne early warning units were designated as VAW.
VB	Bombing Squadron	Carrier-based bomber squadrons, designated as VB, first appeared in the early 1920s. After the end of the World War II all remaining VB units were re-designated as attack squadrons (VA).
VBF	Fighter-Bomber Squadron	Although most World War II era carrier-based fighter units have routinely performed ground attack missions, some squadrons have been specifically designated as VBF during the course of war. VBF designation was discontinued after the war, and until the introduction of the McDonnell-Douglas F/A-18 Hornet the Navy squadrons flying tactical fighters have carried out ground attack duties while being designated VF.
VC	Composite Squadron	There have been several waves of composite squadrons in the U.S. Navy. From 1942 until 1945 the VC designation was assigned to squadrons that comprised fighter and bomber aircraft and flew from escort carriers. All such units were disestablished with the post-war mothballing of escort carriers. The second wave, starting from 1945 and until the late 1950s, consisted of large units that provided detachments of specialized night attack, heavy attack, photographic reconnaissance, electronic warfare and airborne early warning aircraft to active carriers. Many such detachments later transformed into dedicated VA(AW), VAH, VFP, VAP and VAW squadrons. The third wave, between the 1960s and the 1980s, were former utility (VU) squadrons that performed various non-combat support duties such as target towing and specialized training.
VC(N)	Night Development Squadron	A one of a kind designation that was in use during the late 1940s by units responsible for the development and evaluation of night-time flying tactics and equipment.
VCP	Composite Photographic Squadron	For a brief period of time in the 1950s this designation was given to heavy (VAP) and light (VFP) photographic reconnaissance squadrons, but they soon reverted to their original designations.
VCS	Cruiser Scouting Squadron	Squadrons of this type were formed in the late 1930s to provide scout floatplanes for the Navy's cruisers. This designation was discontinued upon the end of World War II.
VD	Photographic Squadron	Photographic squadrons have probably undergone more re-designations than any other single type of squadron in the Navy. The VD designation was in use during the World War II years, to be replaced with VJ after the war.
VF	Fighter Squadron	This is one of the oldest aircraft squadron designators in the Navy, in use since the early 1920s and until 2006 when it was discontinued with the retirement of the Grumman F-14 Tomcat.
VFA	Fighter Attack Squadron	The Navy instituted this designation on 13 November 1980 upon the introduction of the McDonnell-Douglas F/A-18 Hornet.
VFA	Strike Fighter Squadron	On 25 March 1983 the VFA designated squadrons were changed from "Fighter Attack Squadron" to "Strike Fighter Squadron".
VF(AW)	All Weather Fighter Squadron	The Navy used this designator for a short period of time between the mid 1950s and the early 1960s. With all new tactical fighters being radar-equipped and thus all-weather capable (at least in theory), this designator was deemed to be redundant and was discontinued.
VFC	Fighter Squadron, Composite	Introduced in the late 1980s when several former composite (VC) squadrons were thus re-designated to reflect their adversary fighter training role.
VF(N)	Night Fighter Squadron	VF(N) designator was instituted during the World War II years for squadrons composed of radar-equipped fighters. In the mid-1950s this designation was discontinued in favor of the VF(AW) variant to reflect the true all-weather role of newer radar-equipped aircraft.
VFP	Light Photographic Squadron	The VFP designator was assigned to squadrons equipped with photo reconnaissance variants of carrier-capable tactical fighter aircraft. First introduced in the late 1940s, it was discontinued with the demise of the Vought RF-8G Crusader in the 1980s.
VGF	Auxiliary Fighting Squadron	In use in 1942-1943 to designate fighter squadrons assigned for service on the first escort carriers of the U.S. Navy. VGF squadrons were redesignated VF in 1943.
VGS	Auxiliary Scouting Squadron	In use in 1942-1943 to designate scouting squadrons assigned for service on the first escort carriers of the U.S. Navy. VGS squadrons were redesignated VC in 1943.
VJ	Utility Squadron	Between the 1920s and 1945 the VJ designator was assigned to squadrons tasked with support duties such as liaison, logistics and target towing.
VJ	Photographic Squadron	For a brief period between 1945 and 1950 the VJ designator was used by squadrons flying land-based photo reconnaissance aircraft.
VN	Training Squadron	From 1927 until 1947 VN was the designation in use for dedicated training squadrons. From 1947 to 1960 training units were not designated as squadrons, they were "units" or "groups" called Basic Training Groups (BTG), Advanced Training Units (ATU), Jet Transition Training Units (JTTU) or Multi Engine Training Groups (METG). On 1 May 1960 the VT designation was resurrected and existing flying training units were designated "Training Squadrons (VT)".
VO	Observation Squadron	VO squadrons comprised cruiser- and battleship-based observation floatplanes. The designation was discontinued due to retirement of observation floatplanes from the Navy inventory in the late 1940s, but was briefly re-instituted in 1967-1968 for VO-67, a special-purpose squadron flying the Lockheed OP-2E Neptune intelligence-gathering aircraft.
VOF	Observation Fighter Squadron	A short-lived designator that was in use during the second half of the World War II for a small number of stateside units.
VP	Patrol Squadron	This is one of the oldest aircraft squadron designators in the Navy, in use since the early 1920s until today.
VP(AM)	Amphibious Patrol Squadron	This designation was assigned in 1946 to those of the patrol (VP) squadrons that flew amphibious aircraft. The uniform VP designator was re-instituted in 1948.
VP(HL)	Heavy Patrol Squadron	This designation was assigned in 1946 to those of the patrol (VP) squadrons that flew heavy landplane types. The uniform VP designator was re-instituted in 1948.
VP(HS)	Heavy Seaplane Squadron	This designation was assigned in 1946 to those of the patrol (VP) squadrons that flew heavy seaplanes. The uniform VP designator was re-instituted in 1948.
VP(ML)	Medium Patrol Squadron	This designation was assigned in 1946 to those of the patrol (VP) squadrons that flew medium landplane types. The uniform VP designator was re-instituted in 1948.
VP(MS)	Medium Seaplane Squadron	This designation was assigned in 1946 to those of the patrol (VP) squadrons that flew medium seaplanes. The uniform VP designator was re-instituted in 1948.
VPB	Patrol Bombing Squadron	In use during the World War II years to designate land-based bomber units.
VPU	Special Projects Patrol Squadron	A designator assigned to intelligence gathering units flying specially modified P-3 Orions since the late 1960s. VPU units are one of the most obscure in the Navy, as their operations are typically clandestine and classified.
VQ	Fleet Air Reconnaissance Squadron	This designator was instituted in the 1950s for use by squadrons flying highly specialized SIGINT, ELINT and communications relay aircraft.
VR	Fleet Logistics Support Squadron	The mission of VR squadrons is to transport cargo and personnel. At present, this designation is assigned to units that fly landplanes, while the squadrons that fly COD (Carrier Onboard Delivery) aircraft are designated VRC.
VRC	Fleet Logistics Support Squadron	Since the 1960s this designation is reserved for logistics squadrons that fly specialized COD aircraft.
VR(F)	Ferry Squadron	This designator is no longer in use.
VS	Scouting Squadron	First instituted in the early 1920s, the scouting squadron designator was in use until the end of the World War II.
VS	Air Anti-Submarine Squadron	This designation first came into use in the early 1950s with the forming of dedicated carrier-based anti-submarine warfare squadrons.
VS	Sea Control Squadron	In 1993 the VS designation was changed to "Sea Control" to more accurately describe the capabilities of the VS squadrons in both anti-submarine warfare and anti-surface warfare. It was discontinued with the retirement of the Lockheed S-3 Viking in 2009.
VT	Torpedo Bombing Squadron	Carrier-based torpedo bomber squadrons, designated as VT, first appeared in the early 1920s. After the end of the World War II all such units were re-designated as attack squadrons (VA).
VT	Training Squadron	This designation has been in use for dedicated training squadrons since 1 May 1960 and is still in use today.
VT(N)	Night Torpedo Bombing Squadron	VT(N) designator was instituted during the World War II years for those of the torpedo bomber squadrons that were specifically dedicated to night-time attacks. This designation was discontinued after the end of the war.
VU	Utility Squadron	VU designation was assigned between the 1920s and the 1960s to squadrons tasked various non-combat duties, including liaison, light transport and target towing.
VUP	Unmanned Patrol Squadron	This squadron designation was instituted in anticipation of the introduction of the MQ-4C Triton unmanned aerial vehicle into operational service. The first such squadron, VUP-19, was commissioned in October 2016.
VW	Airborne Early Warning Squadron	VW designation was assigned in the 1950s to land-based early warning squadrons. It was discontinued with the retirement of the Lockheed EC-121 Warning Star from the Navy inventory.
VW	Weather Reconnaissance Squadron	Weather Reconnaissance Squadron Four had been flying WC-121 Super Constellations as "Hurricane Hunter" aircraft for many years until 1972 when they transitioned to the WP-3A Orion. The WP-3 was subsequently adopted by NOAA as the WP-3D. VW-4 was disestablished in 1975 and the Navy's four WP-3A aircraft were subsequently converted to VP-3A or RP-3A for other missions.
VX	Air Development Squadron, Air Test and Evaluation Squadron	Squadrons bearing this designation are responsible for the operational testing and evaluation of new aircraft types, weapons, tactics and techniques.
VXE	Antarctic Deployment Squadron	A one of a kind designation that was in use between 1969 and 1999 by VXE-6 dedicated to support of operations and research in the Antarctica.
VXN	Oceanographic Development Squadron	A one of a kind designation that was in use between 1965 and 1993 by VXN-8 dedicated to oceanographic research.
VXS	Scientific Development Squadron	A one of a kind designation in use by VXS-1, a squadron tasked with support of a wide range of scientific research projects.
RVAH	Reconnaissance Attack (Heavy) Squadron	This designation was assigned to squadrons flying the North American RA-5C Vigilante reconnaissance aircraft between 1964 and 1979. As a squadron designator, RVAH violates the established USN naming conventions: no "class" letter is supposed to go in front of the "V". To conform to the then existing squadrons tasked with the same type of mission, the designator should have been VAP (Heavy Photographic Squadron).
RVAW	Readiness Carrier Airborne Early Warning Squadron	For a short period of time this designation was assigned to carrier airborne early warning (VAW) units acting as Fleet Replacement Squadrons. Curiously, other types of fleet replacement squadrons (such as VA, VAQ, VFA, VS, etc.) did not get the "R" added to their designations.

Between 1927 and 1937 suffix letters (or assignment letters) were in use to indicate Fleet or Force assignments of a particular squadron.

Thus, for example, VF-1B stood for Fighter Squadron One, attached to Battle Fleet.

The full list of pre-war suffix letters is as follows:

Suffix Letter	Notes
A	Squadron attached to Asiatic Fleet
B	Squadron attached to Battle Fleet
D	Squadron assigned to a Naval District; the "D" in this case is followed by district number (e.g. VN-1D8 is for Training Squadron One, Naval District Eight)
F	Squadron attached to Base Force
R	Reserve Squadron
S	Squadron attached to Scouting Fleet

A brief resurgence of suffix letters in the Navy squadron designators was seen between 1946 and 1948.

The following suffix letters were in use during that period:

Suffix Letter	Notes
A	Squadron attached to Attack Carrier Air Group
B	Squadron attached to Battle Carrier Air Group
B	For use by Observation Squadrons attached to Battleship Force
C	For use by Observation Squadron attached to Cruiser Force
E	Squadron attached to Escort Carrier Air Group
L	Squadron attached to Light Carrier Air Group

In 1948 the use of suffix letters in squadron designators was discontinued.

== U.S. Navy - List of Lighter-than-Air Squadron Designations ==
The following designations for Lighter-than-Air squadron were in use:

Designator	Full Name	Notes
ZJ	Airship Utility Squadron	First established in 1944, airship utility squadrons were responsible for non-combat support tasks such as photography, calibration and torpedo recovery.
ZP	Airship Patrol Squadron	ZP squadrons were established to carry out patrol, ASW and convoy escort duties. The designation was discontinued in 1961 with the retirement of airships from the active Navy inventory.
ZW	Airship Early Warning Squadron	Established in 1956, ZW squadrons were responsible for all-weather airborne early warning services to fleet forces and shore warning nets as a part of the AEW barrier system. Discontinued in 1961.
ZX	Airship Development Squadron	Established in 1950, responsibilities of ZX squadrons included operational testing and evaluation of new airship equipment, weapons and systems. Discontinued in 1957.

== U.S. Navy - List of Rotary Wing and Tiltrotor Squadron Designations ==
Designator	Full Name	Notes
HA(L)	Helicopter Attack Squadron (Light)	Only three squadrons have ever carried this designation, HA(L)-3 flying the Bell UH-1 Huey helicopter between 1967 and 1972, and HA(L)-4 and HA(L)-5 which flew the HH-1K Huey beginning in the late 1970s until they transitioned to the HH-60H Seahawk and were redesignated HCS squadrons.
HC	Helicopter Combat Support Squadron	This designation was in use between the 1960s and the 2000s. HC squadrons were tasked with a wide variety of duties such as rescue (including combat search and rescue), carrier onboard delivery, liaison, light transport, Vertical Replenishment (VERTREP) and range service.
HCS	Helicopter Combat Support Squadron Special	This designation was in use between 1988 and 2006. HA(L)-4 and HA(L)-5 were redesignated HCS-4 and HCS-5 when they transitioned to the HH-60H Seahawk.
HCT	Helicopter Combat Support Training Squadron	A one of a kind designation that was in use between 1974 and 1977 by HCT-16. The mission of this squadron was to provide helicopter search and rescue and plane guard service for the training aircraft carrier USS Lexington and overall SAR coverage for the Pensacola Naval air training complex.
HM	Helicopter Mine Countermeasures Squadron	Instituted in the 1970s, this designation was assigned to the specialized minesweeping units. Historically, HM squadrons are flying the heaviest helicopter types in the Navy inventory and are thus tasked with logistics and carrier onboard delivery duties as well.
HS	Helicopter Anti-Submarine Squadron	HS designation for the rotary wing ASW squadrons was instituted in the early 1950s. It was discontinued with the retirement of the aircraft carrier based SH-60F Seahawk and the transition of those squadrons to the mulit-mission MH-60S Seahawk.
HSC	Helicopter Sea Combat Squadron	This designation was instituted in the 2000s to emphasize multi-role capabilities of the former carrier based ASW HS squadrons and VERTREP HC squadrons as they transitioned from the SH-60F Seahawk and the H-46 Sea Knight respectively to the MH-60S Seahawk .
HSL	Helicopter Anti-Submarine Squadron Light	HSL designation was instituted in the early 1970s upon the introduction of the ASW variant of the Kaman Seasprite helicopter into the Navy inventory. It was discontinued in the 2000s when the HSL squadrons flying the SH-60B Seahawk transitioned to the MH-60R Seahawk and were redesignated HSM.
HSM	Helicopter Maritime Strike Squadron	This designation was instituted in the 2000s upon the introduction of the Sikorsky MH-60R Seahawk multi-purpose helicopter into the fleet service.
HT	Helicopter Training Squadron	This designation has been in use for dedicated training squadrons since 1 May 1960 and is still in use today.
HU	Helicopter Utility Squadron	This is one of the oldest rotary wing squadron designators in the Navy, in use since 1948 and into the 1960s. Helicopter utility squadrons were typically tasked with such duties as rescue, plane guard, liaison and light transport.
HX	Air Test and Evaluation Squadron	Squadrons bearing this designation are responsible for the operational testing and evaluation of new helicopter types, weapons, tactics and techniques.
VRM	Fleet Logistics Multi-Mission Squadron	First VRM squadron designated 14 December 2018 for CMV-22 Osprey (tilt-rotor) COD transition from the C-2 COD (fixed wing) aircraft.

== U.S. Marine Corps - List of Fixed Wing Squadron Designations ==
Squadron designations between 1920 and 1937:

Designator	Full Name
VF	Fighter Squadron
VJ	Utility Squadron
VO	Observation Squadron
VP	Patrol Squadron
VS	Scouting Squadron

During that period of time a squadron of the Marine Corps could be distinguished from a Navy squadron by a suffix letter "M".

Thus, VF-2M stood for Marine Fighter Squadron Two, VO-8M stood for Marine Observation Squadron Eight, and so forth.

In 1937 the suffix letters in squadron designators were discontinued, and the letter "M" signifying the Marine Corps was moved into a fixed place after the "V". Designations of all existing Marine squadrons were changed accordingly: e.g., VF-2M became VMF-2.

Squadron designations after 1937:

Designator	Full Name	Notes
VMA	Marine Attack Squadron	VMA designation was introduced after the World War II for use by Marine Corps squadrons dedicated to ground attack mission. Discontinued with the retirement of the AV-8B Harrier.
VMA(AW)	Marine All-Weather Attack Squadron	This designator was instituted with the introduction of the Grumman A-6 Intruder all-weather attack bomber into the Marine Corps Aviation in 1966 and was discontinued in 1993 with its retirement.
VMAQ	Marine Tactical Electronic Warfare Squadron	In the mid-1970s, the Marine Corps composite community was reorganized and split into tactical electronic warfare (VMAQ) and photographic reconnaissance (VMFP) squadrons. Discontinued with the retirement of the Grumman EA-6B Prowler highly specialized electronic warfare aircraft.
VMAQT	Marine Tactical Electronic Warfare Training Squadron	VMAQT squadrons are tasked with training pilots and crews on the aircraft employed by VMAQ squadrons.
VMAT	Marine Attack Training Squadron	VMAT squadrons are tasked with training pilots and crews on the aircraft employed by VMA squadrons.
VMB	Marine Bombing Squadron	Marine bombing squadrons, in existence during the World War II years, were first equipped with the Douglas SBD Dauntless and tasked with bombing missions in support of the Marine Corps units. Starting from 1943, a number of new VMB squadrons were formed to fill the need for a long range, land based bomber that could be used against enemy shipping and submarines. These VMB squadrons operated the North American PBJ-1 Mitchell.
VMC	Marine Composite Squadron	Marine composite squadrons, appearing in the early 1950s, consolidated specialized night attack, electronic warfare and airborne early warning aircraft and were tasked with supporting other Marine aviation units.
VMCJ	Marine Composite Squadron	Marine composite squadrons changed their designation from VMC to VMCJ in the late 1950s when photographic reconnaissance assets of VMJ squadrons were integrated into existing composite squadrons. VMCJ units continued to perform electronic warfare and photographic reconnaissance tasks until the 1970s, when these two types of missions were again separated into different types of squadrons, VMAQ and VMFP respectively.
VMD	Marine Photographic Squadron	The VMD designation was in use by photographic reconnaissance squadrons of the Marine Corps during the World War II years, to be replaced with VMJ after the war.
VMF	Marine Fighter Squadron	This is one of the oldest squadron designator in the Marine Corps, in use until the 1970s when it was discontinued with the retirement of the Vought F-8 Crusader.
VMFA	Marine Fighter Attack Squadron	VMFA designation gradually came into use in the mid-1960s with the widespread introduction of the McDonnell-Douglas F-4 Phantom II fighter-bomber into squadron service. Today VMFA squadrons fly the single-seat variants of the F/A-18 Hornet and the Lockheed Martin F-35B Lightning II multirole fighters.
VMFA(AW)	Marine All-Weather Fighter Attack Squadron	This squadron designation was instituted upon the introduction of the McDonnell-Douglas F/A-18D Hornet into the Marine Corps inventory. Discontinued after VMFA(AW)-224 transitioned from the F/A-18D Hornet to the F-35B Lightning II to become VMFA-224.
VMFAT	Marine Fighter Attack Training Squadron	VMFAT squadrons are tasked with training pilots and crews on the aircraft employed by VMFA and VMFA(AW) squadrons.
VMF(AW)	Marine All-Weather Fighter Attack Squadron	This designation was introduced in the mid-1950s to replace the earlier night fighter variant, VMF(N). While those squadrons that received the McDonnell-Douglas F-4 Phantom II in the early 1960s have quickly acquired the new Fighter Attack (VMFA) designation, the units equipped with the Vought F-8 Crusader continued to use the VMF(AW) variant well into the 1970s until the retirement of the Crusader from the Marines inventory.
VMF(N)	Marine Night Fighter Squadron	VMF(N) designator was instituted during the World War II years for squadrons composed of radar-equipped fighters. In the mid-1950s this designation was discontinued in favor of the VMF(AW) variant to reflect the true all-weather role of newer radar-equipped aircraft.
VMFP	Marine Tactical Reconnaissance Squadron	In the mid-1970s, the Marine Corps composite community was reorganized and split into tactical electronic warfare (VMAQ) and tactical reconnaissance (VMFP) squadrons. The single resulting reconnaissance squadron, VMFP-3, operated the McDonnell-Douglas RF-4B Phantom II dedicated photo-reconnaissance variant until its demise in 1990.
VMFT	Marine Fighter Training Squadron	In the past, VMFT squadrons were tasked with training pilots and crews on the aircraft employed by VMF squadrons. Today, the single existing squadron of such type, VMFT-401, provides instruction to active and reserve squadrons through dissimilar adversary combat tactics.
VMFT(AW)	Marine All-Weather Fighter Training Squadron	VMFT(AW) squadrons were tasked with training pilots and crews on the aircraft employed by VMF(AW) squadrons.
VMGR	Marine Aerial Refueler Transport Squadron	With the introduction of the KC-130F aerial refueling variant of the Lockheed Hercules in the early 1960s, several former VMR squadrons were re-designated VMGR, and their primary mission became aerial refueling. Besides that, VMGR squadrons are tasked with providing assault transport of troops, equipment, and supplies.
VMGRT	Marine Aerial Refueler Transport Training Squadron	VMGRT squadrons are tasked with training pilots and crews on the aircraft employed by VMGR squadrons.
VMJ	Marine Utility Squadron	Between the 1937 and 1945 the VMJ designation was assigned to Marine Corps squadrons tasked with support duties such as target towing, liaison and logistics
VMJ	Marine Photographic Squadron	Marine photographic reconnaissance squadrons were assigned this designation for a brief period between 1945 and the early 1950s when the photo reconnaissance assets were integrated into composite (VMCJ) squadrons.
VMIT	Marine Instrument Training Squadron	This was a short-lived designation used in the 1950s by a small number of squadrons specially tasked with instrument flight training for the Marine Corps pilots.
VML	Marine Glider Squadron	In existence between 1942 and 1943, glider squadrons were supposed to be a part of the Marine Corps glider infantry force. The program was terminated with the general disillusionment in offensive glider operations.
VMO	Marine Observation Squadron	Although initially conceived for the purpose of observation and artillery spotting, VMO squadrons performed a wide variety of tasks, including fighter, close air support, liaison, rescue and medevac missions. The designation was in use until the 1990s when it was discontinued with the retirement of the North American OV-10 Bronco. Despite being formally assigned to the fixed wing category, VMO squadrons routinely operated helicopters throughout the 1950s and 1960s.
VMP	Marine Photographic Squadron	The VMP designation was in use by photographic reconnaissance squadrons of the Marine Corps during the World War II years, to be replaced with VMJ after the war.
VMR	Marine Transport Squadron	The mission of VMR squadrons is to support the Marine Corps operations with transporting personnel and cargo, medical evacuation and aerial resupply.
VMS	Marine Scouting Squadron	Since their inception, Marine Corps scouting squadrons normally flew the same types of light scout bomber aircraft as did their Navy VS counterparts and were tasked with scouting and bombing duties. During the World War II years the VMS designation gradually gave way to VMSB, with both disappearing after the war end.
VMSB	Marine Scout Bombing Squadron	Marine scout bombing squadrons, in existence during the World War II, were tasked with bombing, close air support and scouting missions. They operated the Vought SB2U Vindicator, Douglas SBD Dauntless and Curtiss SB2C Helldiver.
VMT	Marine Training Squadron	VMT designation was in use for the Marine Corps training squadrons until the 1960s when the Corps introduced the practice of giving specialized designations to training squadrons depending on the mission type they were training for, such as VMAT, VMFT, VMFT(AW) and so forth.
VMTB	Marine Torpedo Bombing Squadron	Marine torpedo bombing squadrons, in existence during the World War II, performed bombing and close air support missions. They operated the Grumman TBF Avenger torpedo bomber aircraft.
VMU	Marine Unmanned Aerial Vehicle Squadron	This squadron designation was instituted in 1996, a considerable time after the widespread introduction of tactical unmanned aerial vehicles into the Marine Corps inventory has begun. The primary mission of VMU squadrons is aerial surveillance and reconnaissance in support of the Marine Corps ground troops.
VMX	Marine Operational Test and Evaluation Squadron	VMX-1, the only squadron in existence bearing the VMX designation, is responsible for the operational testing and evaluation of new aircraft types, weapons, tactics and techniques for the Marine Corps. It operates fixed wing, rotary wing and tiltrotor assets, depending on the current programs.

== U.S. Marine Corps - List of Rotary Wing and Tiltrotor Squadron Designations ==
Designator	Full Name	Notes
HMA	Marine Attack Helicopter Squadron	This designation was instituted in the early 1970s upon the introduction of the Bell AH-1 Cobra into the Marine Corps inventory. Later this designation was discontinued and replaced with HMLA - Light Attack Helicopter Squadron.
HMH	Marine Heavy Helicopter Squadron	This designation was instituted in the early 1960s. Since then it was assigned to squadrons flying heavy transport / heavy lift helicopters such as Sikorsky CH-37 Mojave and CH-53 Sea Stallion / Super Stallion.
HMHT	Marine Heavy Helicopter Training Squadron	HMHT squadrons are tasked with training pilots and crews on the helicopters employed by HMH squadrons.
HML	Marine Light Helicopter Squadron	Instituted in the early 1960s, this designation was assigned to squadrons flying various incarnations of the ubiquitous Bell UH-1 Huey.
HMLA	Marine Light Attack Helicopter Squadron	In use since the 1980s by squadrons tasked with ground attack missions and flying various variants of the Bell AH-1.
HMLAT	Marine Light Attack Helicopter Training Squadron	HMLAT squadrons are tasked with training pilots and crews on the helicopters employed by HMLA squadrons.
HMM	Marine Medium Helicopter Squadron	This designation was instituted in the early 1960s. Since then it was assigned to squadrons flying medium helicopters such as Sikorsky UH-34 Seahorse and Boeing Vertol CH-46 Sea Knight. Light helicopters (such as the Bell UH-1 Huey) were also assigned to HMM squadrons when required.
HMMT	Marine Medium Helicopter Training Squadron	HMMT squadrons are tasked with training pilots and crews on the helicopters employed by HMM squadrons.
HMR	Marine Helicopter Transport Squadron	This is the oldest rotary wing squadron designator in the Marine Corps, in use since 1951 and until the late 1950s by squadrons flying the Sikorsky HRS transport helicopter.
HMR(L)	Marine Helicopter Transport Squadron (Light)	This short-lived designation was assigned in the late 1950s to squadrons flying the Sikorsky HRS and Sikorsky HUS transport helicopters. In 1962 these units were re-designated as HMM – Medium Helicopter Squadrons.
HMR(M)	Marine Helicopter Transport Squadron (Medium)	This short-lived designation was assigned in the late 1950s to squadrons flying the Sikorsky HR2S heavy transport helicopter. In 1962 these units were re-designated as HMH – Heavy Helicopter Squadrons.
HMT	Marine Helicopter Training Squadron	A designation assigned to training squadrons operating a mix of different helicopter types (e.g. medium and heavy).
HMX	Marine Helicopter Squadron	A one of a kind designation carried by HMX-1, the squadron responsible for the helicopter transportation of the highest ranking government officials as well as with operational test and evaluation of new flight systems for Marine Corps helicopters.
VMM	Marine Medium Tiltrotor Squadron	VMM designation was instituted with the transitioning of existing Medium Helicopter Squadrons (HMM) to the new MV-22 Osprey tiltrotor aircraft.
VMMT	Marine Medium Tiltrotor Training Squadron	Instituted upon the introduction of the MV-22 Osprey, VMMT squadrons are tasked with training pilots and crews on the tiltrotor aircraft employed by VMM squadrons.
