= HSC-85 =

HELSEACOMBATRON EIGHT FIVE ("FIREHAWKS")
- Active: 1 July 1970 – 30 September 2023
- Country: United States of America
- Branch: United States Navy Reserve
- Type: Helicopter Squadron
- Role: Maritime Interdiction, Search and Rescue, Personnel Recovery, Casualty Evacuation, Special Operations Support
- Homeport: NAS North Island
- Nickname: Firehawks
- Mottos: Ready, Resilient, Resourceful
- Operations: Operation Iraqi Freedom, Operation Enduring Freedom, Global War on Terror

Commanders
- Commanding Officer: CDR N. W. Ryan
- Executive Officer: CDR R. A. Coffman
- Command Master Chief: CMDCM M. S. Dumlao

Aircraft flown
- Multirole helicopter: MH-60S

Helicopter Sea Combat Squadron EIGHT FIVE (HSC-85) was a United States Navy Reserve forces helicopter squadron (RESFORON) based out of Naval Air Station North Island in San Diego, California. The "FIREHAWKS" of HSC-85 are Reserve and Active Component Sailors who operate and maintain Sikorsky MH-60S Seahawk helicopters.

== Mission ==
HSC-85 provides strategic depth to Commander, Naval Air Forces and deploys in response to requests for forces from geographic combatant commanders. HSC-85 is also charged with providing training and readiness support to United States Naval Special Warfare Command and other services' special operations forces.

== History ==
HSC-85 traces its lineage back through a number of previous aviation units, both active and reserve, all the way to the U.S. Navy’s first operational helicopter squadron, the FLEET ANGELS of Helicopter Utility Squadron ONE (HU-1) which was established 1 April 1948. Former missions of anti-submarine warfare and logistics support and current missions of combat search and rescue and special operations support are also traceable back to HSC-85 predecessors.

HU-1 was re-designated as Helicopter Combat Support Squadron ONE (HC-1) in 1966 and deployed in detachments to support combat operations in Vietnam. The squadron continued to grow in size and in mission, leading to its breakup and formation of four new squadrons. Of these new squadrons, the SEA DEVILS of Helicopter Combat Support Squadron SEVEN (HC-7) were assigned the "Combat Search and Rescue" mission and the SEAWOLVES of Helicopter Attack Squadron (Light) THREE (HA(L)-3) were assigned the "Special Operations Support" mission.

As the utility of helicopters continued to grow throughout U.S. Navy operations, "Anti-Submarine Warfare" helicopter units were stood-up to protect surface action groups from submarine threats and provide search and rescue capabilities and "Logistics Support" to the surface fleet.

As hostilities ended in Vietnam, the U.S. Navy recognized a need to form reserve aviation squadrons in order to retain combat experienced aviators and maintenance personnel leaving active service but desiring to remain in the ready reserve as citizen Sailors. In June 1975 Helicopter Wing Reserve (HELWINGRES) was established at NAS North Island and included (among other helicopter squadrons) the HA(L)-4 REDWOLVES and HA(L)-5 BLUEHAWKS performing the special operations support mission and the HC-9 PROTECTORS performing the combat search and rescue mission.

=== Anti-Submarine Warfare and Logistics Support ===
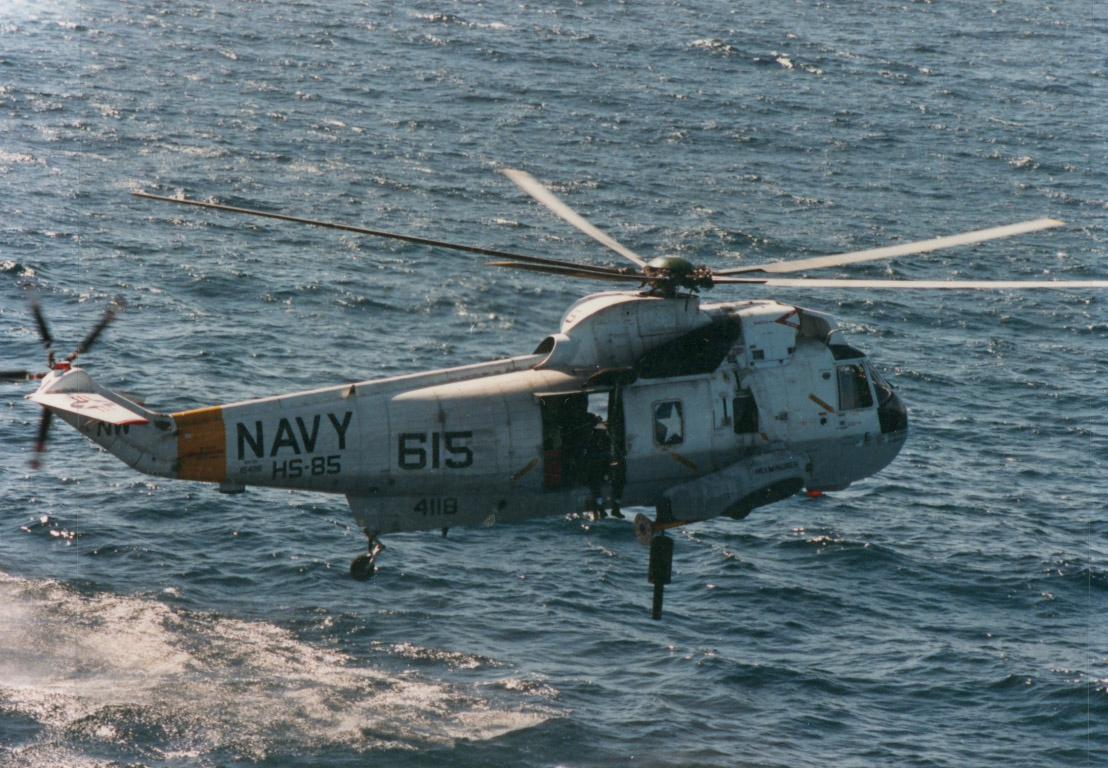
An HS-85 SH-3 Sea King conducting anti-submarine warfare training.

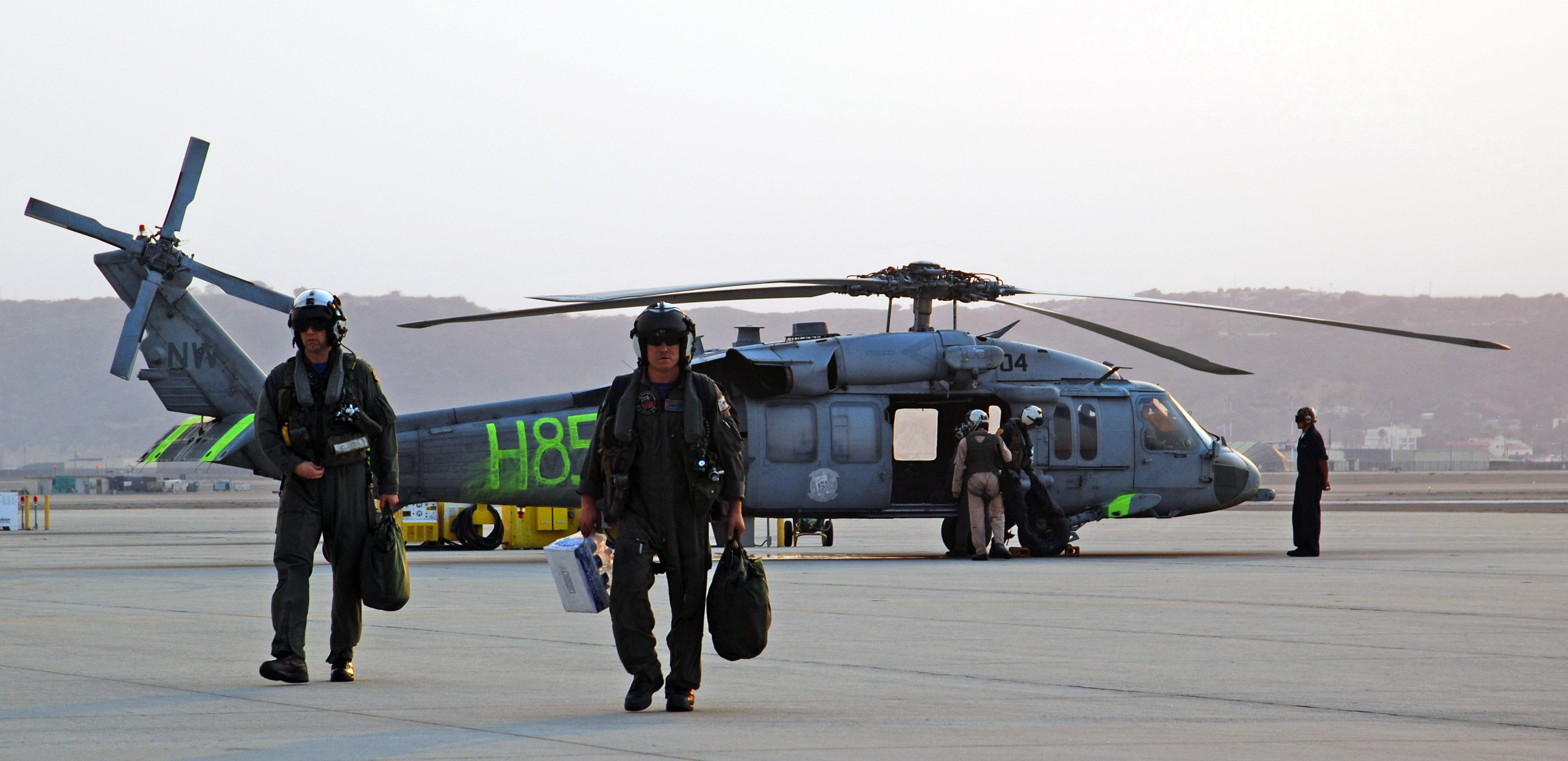
HSC-85 aircrews flying the MH-60S conduct aerial fire fighting support

On 1 July 1970, the GOLDEN GATERS of Helicopter Anti-Submarine Squadron EIGHT FIVE (HS-85) were established. Operating out of NAS Alameda, HS-85 flew the Sikorsky SH-3A Sea King, and later the SH-3D and SH-3H, providing logistics support to the Pacific Fleet and serving as a repository of anti-submarine experience and talent for aircrews and maintainers of the Navy Reserve. In 1993 HS-85 moved from NAS Alameda to NAS North Island in San Diego, CA.

In October 1994 HS-85 was re-designated as HC-85 and assimilated into HELWINGRES while retaining the GOLDEN GATERS moniker. HC-85 operated the utility UH-3H Sea King and remained a provider of search and rescue and logistics support to the Pacific Fleet, as well as supporting target launch and torpedo recovery on the Southern California Offshore Range (SCORE) complex at NALF San Clemente Island.

In February 2006, the squadron was again re-designated, this time as Helicopter Sea Combat Squadron EIGHT FIVE (HSC-85), and changed its name to HIGH ROLLERS, keeping with the theme of newly formed expeditionary squadrons, the HSC-21 BLACKJACKS (re-designated from the HC-11 GUNBEARERS) and the HSC-23 WILDCARDS. Trading in its UH-3H Sea Kings for utility Sikorsky MH-60S Seahawks, HSC-85 continued its Pacific Fleet and SCORE support until 2011 when the squadron’s mission changed to dedicated special operations support.

=== Combat Search and Rescue Support ===
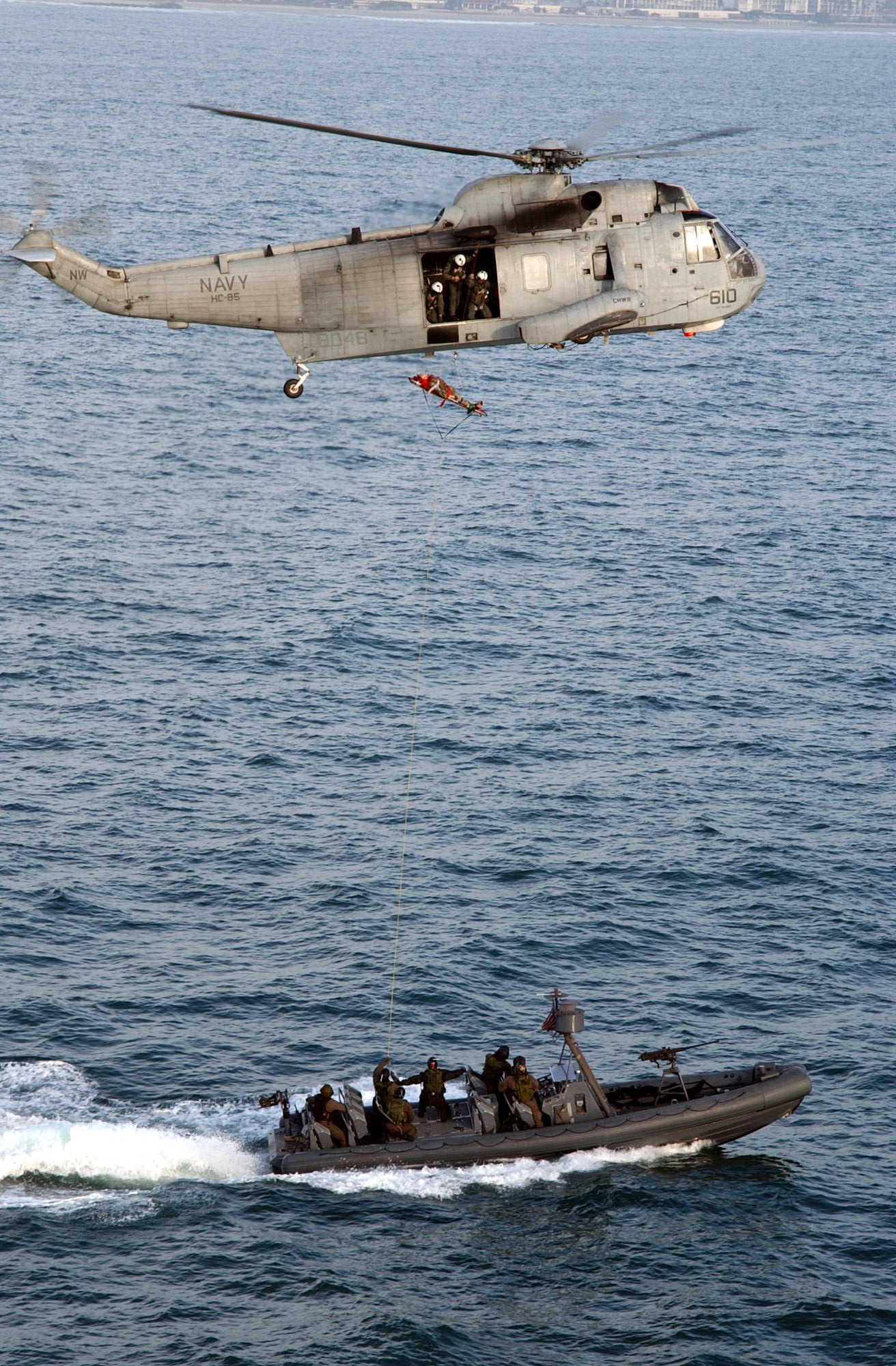
An HC-85 UH-3 Sea King conducts search and rescue training.

On 1 September 1967, the HC-7 SEA DEVILS were established out of two separate HC-1 search and rescue detachments, one homeported at NAAF Ream Field in Imperial Beach, CA and one homeported at NAF Atsugi, Japan. HC-7 flew the Kaman HH-2C Sea Sprite and Sikorsky HH-3A Sea King – dubbed "Big Mothers" – and deployed as detachments supporting combat search and rescue operations throughout the Pacific fleet and Southeast Asia areas of operations. Despite an incredible record of over 150 personnel rescued (including fighter aces LT William Driscoll and LT Randy Cunningham), awards of 5 Navy Crosses, 3 Silver Stars, 8 Distinguished Flying Crosses and the only Medal of Honor awarded to a Naval Aviator during the Vietnam War (LT Clyde Lassen), HC-7 and all associated detachments were disestablished on 30 June 1975.

In an attempt to preserve the combat experience of HC-7 aircrews and personnel, the U.S. Navy Reserve established the HC-9 PROTECTORS on 1 August 1975 as part of HELWINGRES. HC-9 continued to fly the HH-3A Sea King, providing combat search and rescue training, as well as operational support when called upon, to carrier strike groups. HC-9 was disestablished in 1988 as HELWINGRES combined combat search and rescue and special operations support into two remaining reserve squadrons, Helicopter Combat Support Squadrons (Special) FOUR and FIVE (HCS-4 and HCS-5).

=== Special Operations Support ===
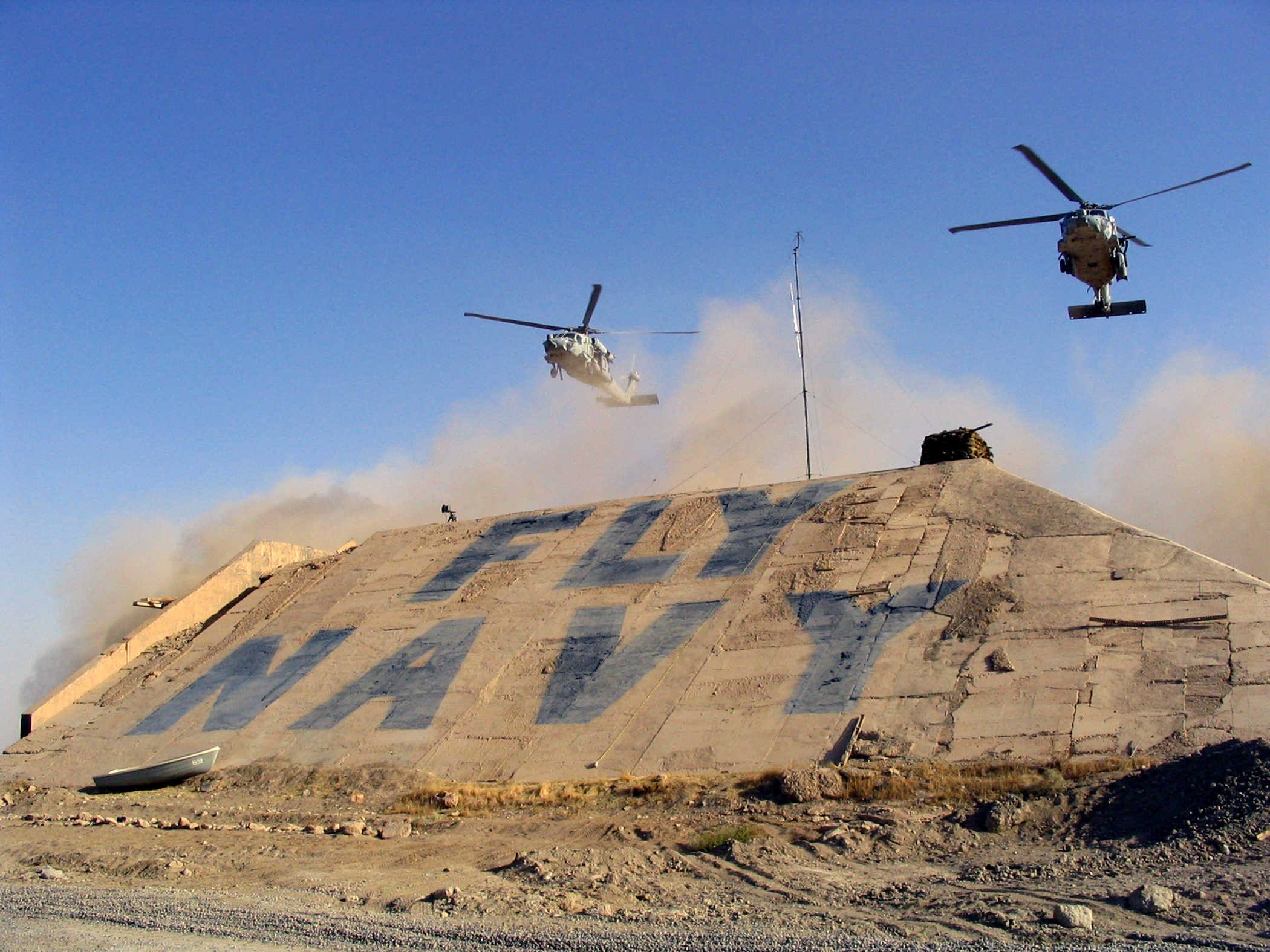
Two HCS-5 HH-60H assigned to JSOAD-AP in OIF.

U.S. Forces in Vietnam initiated Operation GAME WARDEN in 1966, which consisted of Navy SEALs on Patrol Boat, Riverine (PBR) watercraft patrolling the rivers of the Mekong Delta attempting to limit Viet Cong traffic, supported from the air during enemy contact by U.S. Army Bell UH-1 Iroquois gunships. The distance from Army forward operating bases housing the gunships was often too great for timely support. HC-1 was soon assigned the task, operating hand-me-down UH-1 Hueys in two-helicopter detachments aboard Tank Landing Ships (LST) stationed nearer the waterways of the Delta. As HC-1 grew and became too unwieldy to be effective as a single squadron, the detachments of Operation SEALORDS, were consolidated into a single squadron, the SEAWOLVES of HA(L)-3, established 1 April 1967. The all-volunteer squadron of former HC-1 personnel eventually became nine detachments along the Delta with a maintenance facility at Binh Thuy, Vietnam.

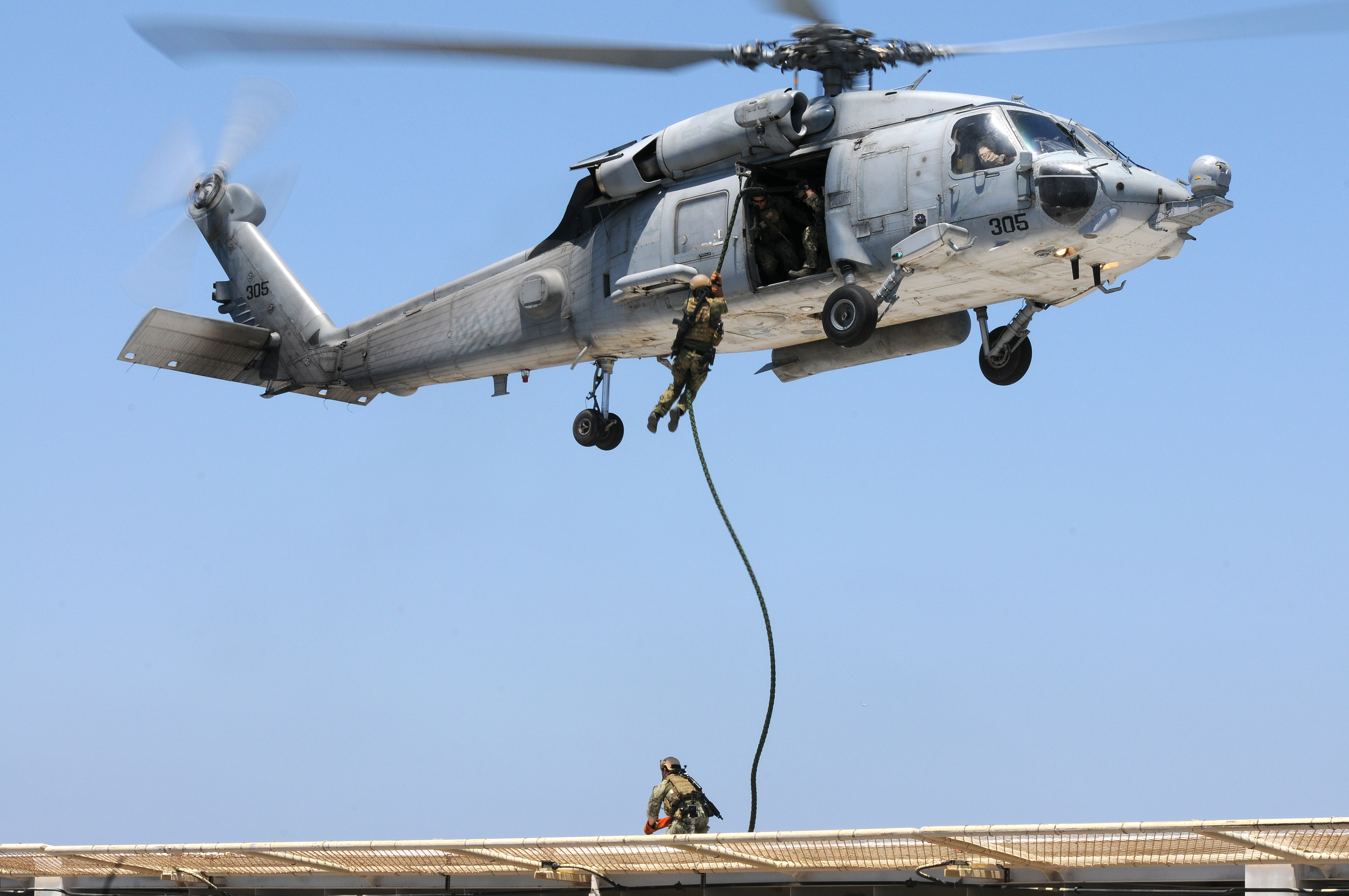
An HSC-85 HH-60H fastropes Navy SEALs to an oil and gas platform.

The SEAWOLVES support to Navy SEALs and PBR crews during 78,000 combat mission between April 1967 and March 1972 is legendary, resulting in 24,000 individual decorations, including 5 Navy Crosses, 31 Silver Stars, 219 Distinguished Flying Crosses, 16,000 Air Medals and six Presidential Unit Citations. Forty-four SEAWOLVES were killed-in-action or remain missing. Despite this incredible record, HA(L)-3 was disestablished in March 1972, giving the unit the distinction of the only Naval Aviation squadron to be commissioned and decommissioned outside of the United States.

Again attempting to preserve combat experience in helicopter operations, HELWINGRES established two squadrons to continue the special operations support mission, the REDWOLVES of HA(L)-4 and the BLUEHAWKS of HA(L)-5. HA(L)-5, established 1 March 1977 and based at NAS Point Mugu, and HA(L)-4, established one year later and based at NS Norfolk, both operated the HH-1K Huey, providing special operations training and deployed operational support when called upon to Navy SEAL units and surface strike groups of the Atlantic and Pacific Fleets.

On 1 October 1988, HA(L)-5 was re-designated HCS-5, became known as the FIREHAWKS and moved to NAS North Island a few years later. HA(L)-4 was re-designated HCS-4 and kept the REDWOLVES name. Both squadrons transitioned to flying the Sikorsky HH-60H, known unofficially as the Rescue Hawk, continuing their mission of special operations support and assuming the combat search and rescue mission as HC-9 was disestablished.

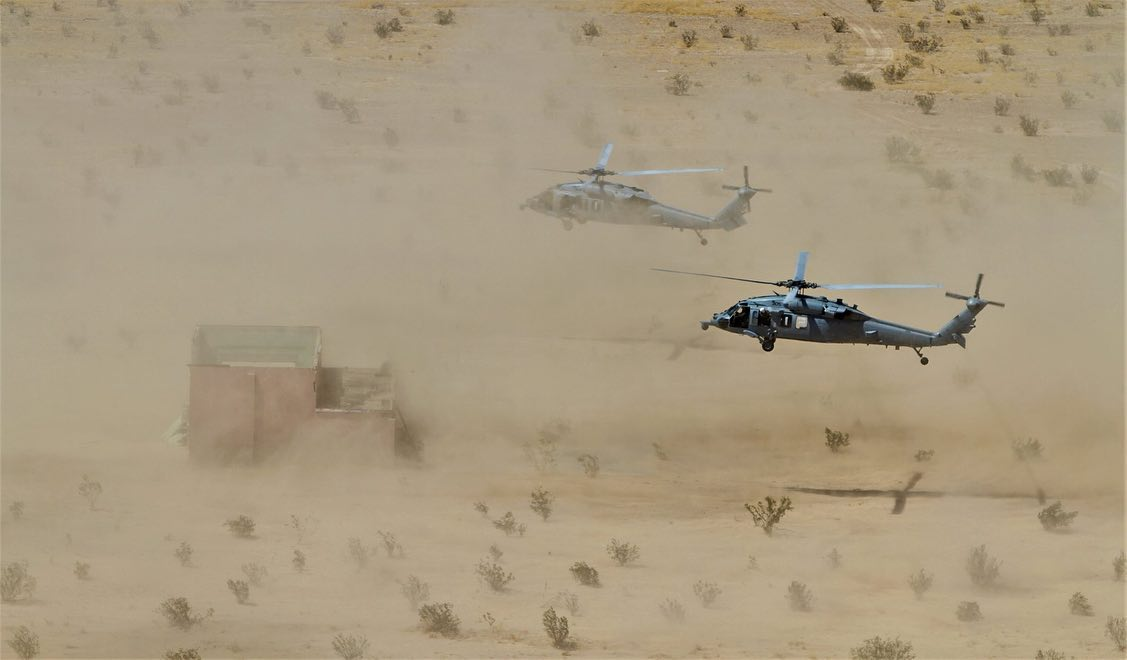
HSC-85 MH-60S perform overland insertion training.

Despite a robust history of support to combat operations, including combat search and rescue strip alert during Operations DESERT SHIELD and DESERT STORM, special operations support during UPHOLD DEMOCRACY, and performing both missions during three years of constant support to Joint Special Operations Air Detachment, Arabian Peninsula (JSOAD-AP) during IRAQI FREEDOM, HCS-5 was disestablished 31 December 2006, leaving HCS-4, now re-designated HSC-84, as the sole Navy squadron dedicated to special operations support.

=== Current Operations ===
In 2011 the primary mission of HSC-85 was assigned as dedicated special operations support at the request of U.S. Special Operations Command. The squadron still housed remnants of mission experienced personnel from HCS-5 as well as HCS-4, now known as HSC-84. HSC-85 took on the FIREHAWKS name and transitioned from the utility MH-60S to the HH-60H.

In 2016 the U.S. Navy again decided to disestablish HSC-85 and HSC-84, even though both were deployed at the time in support of U.S. Pacific Command and U.S. Central Command, respectively. Following Congressional involvement, HSC-85 remained while HSC-84 was shuttered, with the U.S. Navy pledging to retain special operations and combat search and rescue mission experience in newly formed Tactical Support Units on both the east (TSULANT) and west (TSUPAC) coasts.

In 2018 HSC-85 transitioned from the HH-60H to the Block III MH-60S. The squadron currently operates in support of U.S. Indo-Pacific Command and provides training and readiness support to Naval Special Warfare (WARCOM) and other service’s special operations units.

The Squadron is slated for deactivation in Fall of 2023.

=== Insignia of HSC-85 which was formerly designated HS-85 and HC-85 and which existed from 1 July 1970 to 30 September 2023 ===
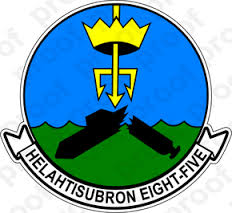
HS-85 "Golden Gaters" 1970–1994

HC-85 "Golden Gaters" 1994–2006

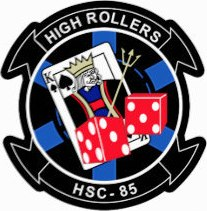
HSC-85 "High Rollers" 2006–2011

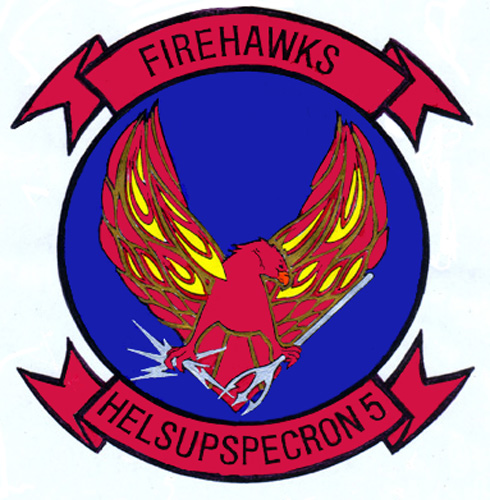
HSC-85 "Firehawks" 2011–2023

=== Insignia of HAL-5 and HCS-5 which existed from 1 March 1977 to 31 December 2006 ===
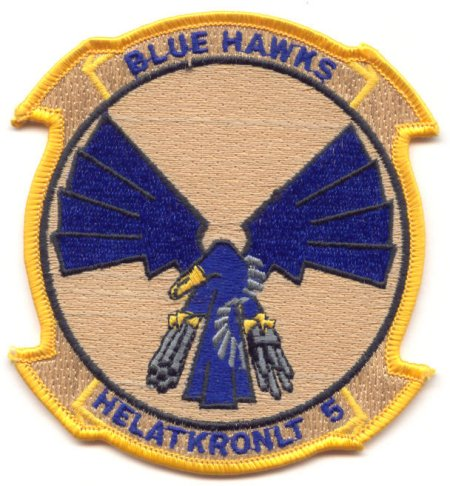
HA(L)-5 "Bluehawks" 1977–1988

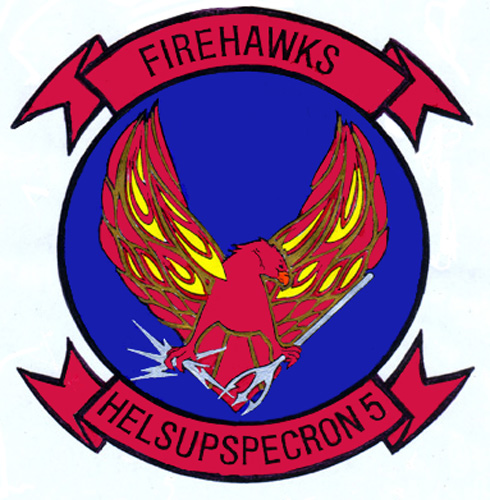
HCS-5 "Firehawks" 1988–2006

== See also ==
- U.S. Army Special Operations Aviation Command
- Air Force Special Operations Command
- List of United States Navy aircraft squadrons
