= VAL-4 =

Light Attack Squadron 4
- Active: January 1969-April 1972
- Country: United States
- Branch: United States Navy
- Role: Light attack
- Part of: Inactive
- Nickname(s): Black Ponies
- Engagements: Vietnam War

Aircraft flown
- Attack: OV-10A/D Bronco

VAL-4 was a Light Attack Squadron of the U.S. Navy. Established on 3 January 1969, it was disestablished on 10 April 1972.

== Operational history ==
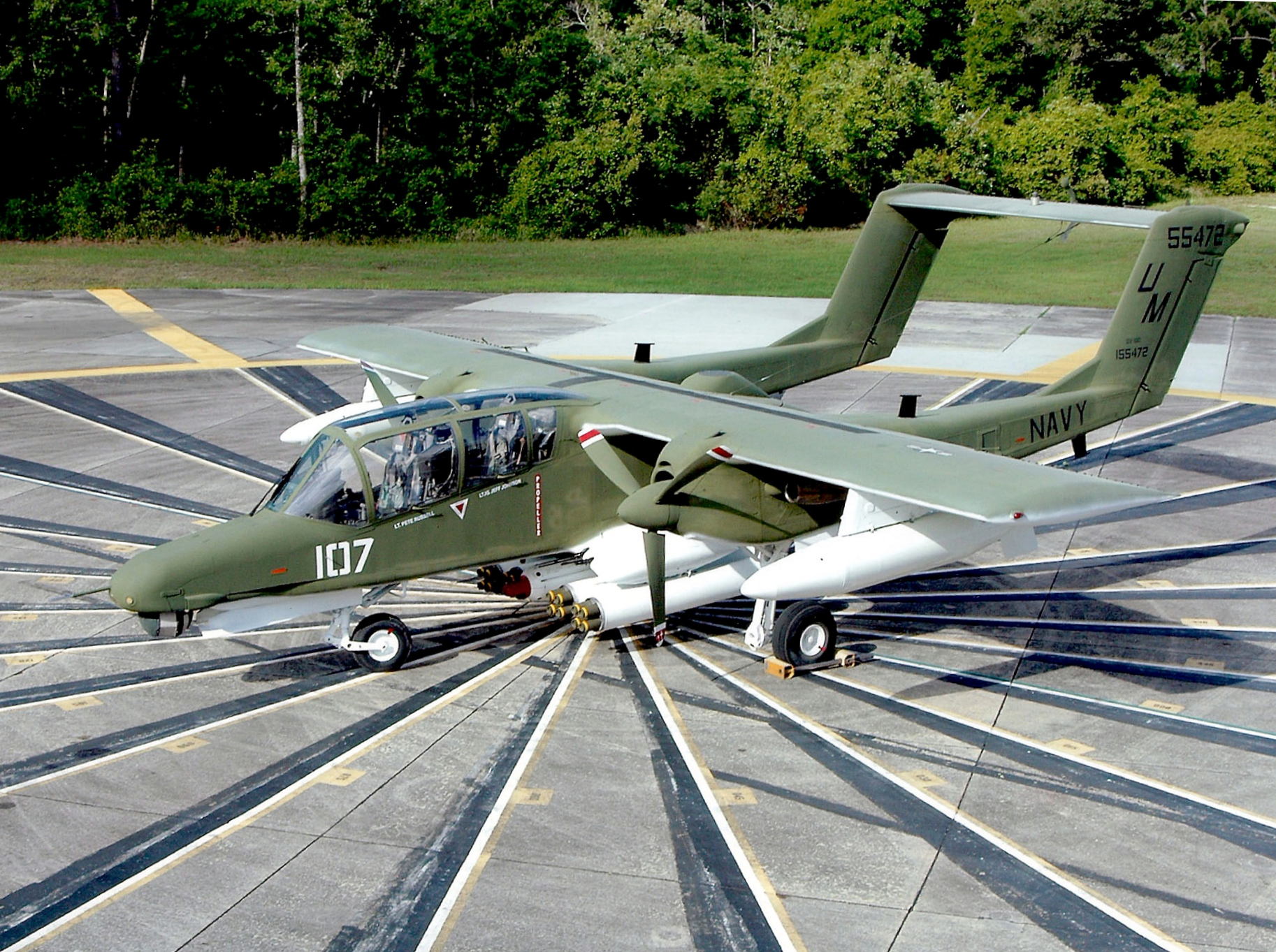
VAL-4 OV-10D in 1969

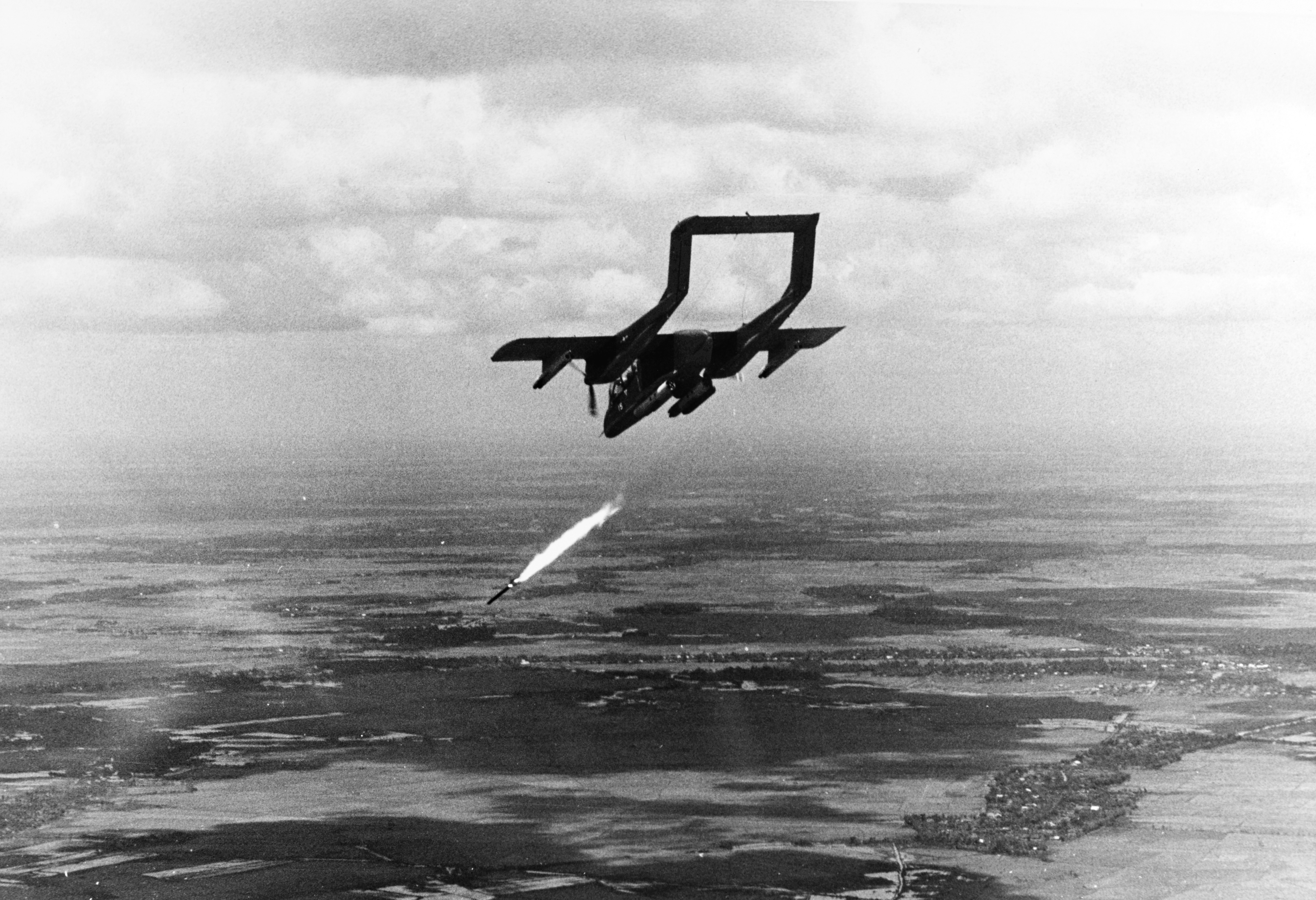
VAL-4 OV-10A fires a Zuni rocket in Vietnam c.1969

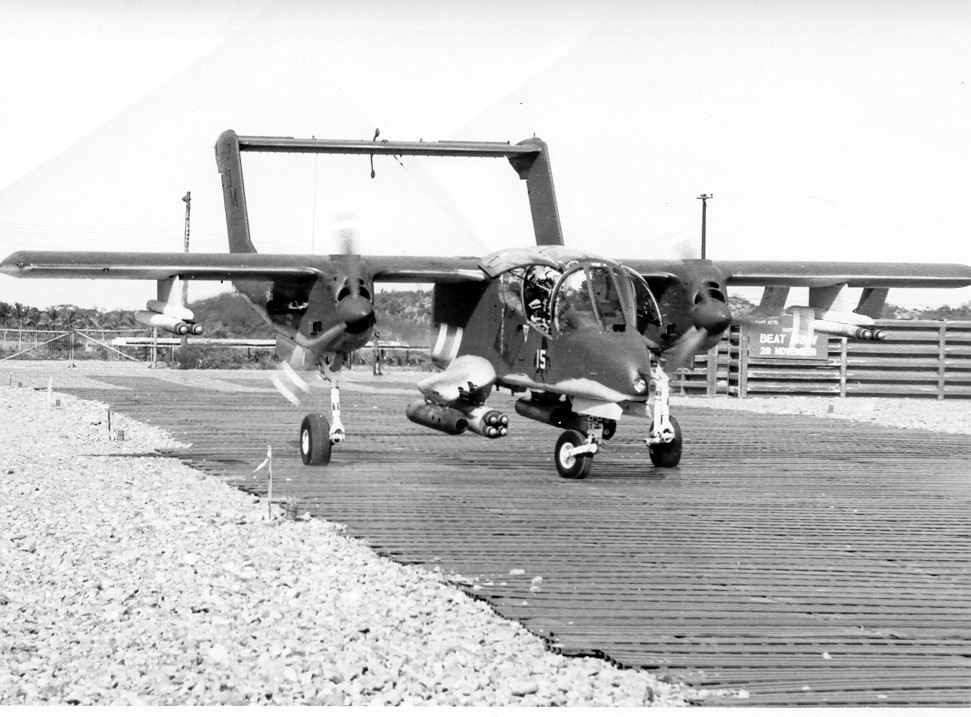
VAL-4 OV-10A c.1969

In September 1968 VS-41 began training personnel scheduled for assignment to VAL-4, receiving their first OV-10A Broncos the following month. On 3 January 1969 VAL-4 was established with the mission of conducting surveillance and offensive operations in support of river patrol craft, as well as providing air support for SEALS and combined U.S. Army, Navy and South Vietnamese operations, complementing the operations of HA(L)-3.

In March 1969 VAL-4 was permanently based at the Naval Support Activity Detachment Airfield, Binh Thuy Air Base, South Vietnam, for combat operations. The squadron had two detachments, Detachment A assigned to Binh Thuy and Detachment B assigned to Vung Tau Air Base.

On 19 April 1969 the squadron began combat operations, flying air support for the Mobile Riverine Force in the Mekong Delta of South Vietnam. The missions included normal patrol, overhead air cover, scramble alert and gunfire/artillery spotting. The OV-10s large payload and long endurance meant that it could provide air support to US and Army of the Republic of Vietnam (ARVN) forces throughout the delta.

From April–May 1970 VAL-4 participated in combined South Vietnamese and U.S. Riverine Force operations designed to neutralize sanctuary bases in the Mekong delta in support of the Cambodian Campaign.

On 1 July 1970 Detachment B was disestablished and all operations were concentrated at Binh Thuy.

In February 1971 VAL-4 with HA(L)-3 provided air support for Republic of Vietnam Navy supply convoys up the Mekong river to Phnom Penh.

On 31 March 1972 the squadron conducted its last combat mission prior to its disestablishment on 10 April 1972.

== Home port assignments ==
The squadron was assigned to these home ports:

- NAS North Island
- NAS Binh Thuy

== Aircraft assignment ==
- OV-10A/D Bronco

== See also ==
- List of inactive United States Navy aircraft squadrons
- History of the United States Navy
