= Helicopter Attack Squadron (Light) Five =

Helicopter Attack Squadron (Light) 5
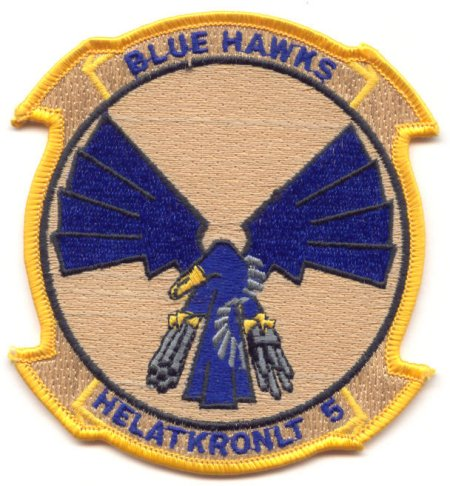
- Official HA(L)-5 Patch
- Active: 1 March 1977 – 20 October 1988
- Country: United States of America
- Branch: United States Navy
- Type: Helicopter
- Role: Special Warfare Support, Close Air Support
- Garrison/HQ: Naval Air Station Point Mugu, California
- Nickname: Blue Hawks
- Colors: Blue
- Mascot: Blue Hawk

Helicopter Attack Squadron (Light) Five, abbreviation HA(L)-5 (sometimes stylized as HAL-5), was a helicopter attack squadron of the United States Navy.

HA(L)-5 was the initial designation of the close air support squadron in the period following the Vietnam War, which, along with its sister squadron HA(L)-4 "Red Wolves", was one of the last two US Navy squadrons using HH-1K "Huey" gunships. In October 1989 the squadron was redesignated Helicopter Combat Support Squadron Special Five (HCS-5), it adopted the name "Firehawks" and it traded in its "Hueys" for HH-60H Seahawk Combat Search and Rescue helicopters. The squadron was deactivated on 13 December 2006.

== Genesis of the HA(L) squadrons ==
In 1966, United States Naval Special Warfare Command rotary support was originated as part of the response to the ongoing Vietnam War. Starting with Helicopter Combat Support Squadron ONE (HC-1), detachments of helicopter gunships supported the Mobile Riverine Force (also known as the Brown-water navy) effort in the Mekong Delta region of South Vietnam. HC-1 "Fleet Angels" operated two-aircraft detachments of UH-1B gunships, staged from amphibious vessels. Providing a quick reaction force and performing a close air-support (CAS) role for units of the Navy's Special Warfare Groups and the Mobile Riverine Force, the effectiveness of the helicopter attack mission was quickly realized and in response, the Navy began to widen the mission, creating the need for a specific Squadron to provide that support. In April 1967, HC-1 was divided into four separate units, Helicopter Attack Squadron (Light) 3 (HA(L)-3) (Navy Gunships), Helicopter Combat Support Squadron THREE (Navy Vertical Replenishment), Helicopter Combat Support Squadron FIVE (LAMPS), and Helicopter Combat Support Squadron Seven (Navy Combat Search and Rescue).

Nicknamed the "Seawolves", HA(L)-3 was established in South Vietnam with its headquarters originally in Vung Tau and later at Binh Thuy Air Base, originally flying in support of Operation Game Warden, earned over 20,000 unit and personnel awards. HA(L)-3 was disestablished in 1972 and in 1997, the US Navy recognized the service of the squadrons aircrew, retroactively awarding the Combat Aircrew Insignia to Combat Aircrewmen who served in HA(L)-3.

== Birth of the Blue Hawks ==
Four years after the disestablishment of HA(L)-3, the Navy determined that it still had a need for the Navy Gunship, establishing two new Helicopter Attack (Light) Squadrons in the Naval Reserves as part of the newly formed Commander, Helicopter Wing Reserve (COMHELWINGRES) in 1976. Helicopter Attack Squadron (Light) FIVE (HA(L)-5), nicknamed the "Blue Hawks", was established at Naval Air Station Point Mugu, California on the 1 March 1977 and its sister squadron, Helicopter Attack Squadron (Light) FOUR (HA(L)-4), known as the Red Wolves, was formed at Naval Air Station Norfolk, Virginia on 1 July 1976.

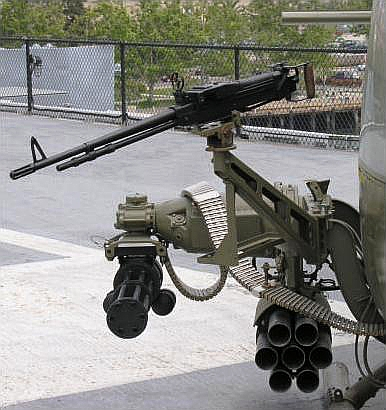
M-21 Weapon System

Given the mission of providing support to the Naval Special Warfare Command in support of Navy SEALs, EOD, and Navy Special Boat Units, flying the HH-1K Iroquois, the Navy once again had Gunships to support its special warfare operations. The HH-1K, possessing the same firepower as the UH-1B aircraft used by the HA(L)-3 Sea Wolves, had greater lift capability and allowed the aircraft to carry a higher payload. Outfitted with the M-21 weapons subsystem, it included two co-pilot controlled GAU-2B/A miniguns, two pilot-controlled rocket launchers, with a total of fourteen 2.75 inch Folding Fin Aerial Rockets (FFAR), and two crew operated M60 light machineguns. The aircraft was also equipped with a crew-controlled rescue hoist and the crews included Rescue Swimmers, although its primary mission did not include Combat Search and Rescue.

With the proliferation and modernization of weapons technology in the four years since Vietnam, HA(L)-5 aircraft and crews deployed new countermeasures and tactics to defeat the changing combat threat environment, introducing Night Vision Goggles (NVG) and a flight profile called Nap-of-the-Earth (NOE), the aircrews learned to avoid detection by enemy forces and minimize the threat of hand-held infra-red seeking missile systems.

The squadron, consisting of eight HH-1K Iroquois helicopters, 40 flight crewmen, and 150 maintenance and support personnel, operated from a home base at NAS Point Mugu, California in support of the Commander of the Naval Special Warfare Group at the Naval Amphibious Base, Coronado, California and made deployments to countries such as Egypt and South Korea.

== Changing of the guard; re-designation to Helicopter Combat Support Special Squadron 5 (HCS-5) ==
In 1983, a proposal was made to the Chief of Naval Operations (CNO) to combine the mission of the Naval Special Warfare Support mission of HA(L)-5 and HA(L)-4 with the Combat Search and Rescue (CSAR) Mission of Helicopter Combat Support Squadron NINE (HC-9), nicknamed the "Protectors". Two new squadrons, replacing three in the United States Navy Reserve, with the new aircraft significantly more capable of surviving in high-threat environments and able to operate from a wider variety of Navy ships. In conjunction with the United States Coast Guard, the US Navy undertook the development of the new CSAR helicopter, designated HH-60H Rescue Hawk in the USN and HH-60J Jayhawk in the USCG. 20 October 1988 HA(L)-5 was re-designated Helicopter Combat Support Special Squadron FIVE (HCS-5), nicknamed the "Firehawks" operating the new HH-60H helicopters. HCS-5 would remain at NAS Point Mugu for several years before moving to NAS North Island, the original home of HC-9. Most of the original HA(L)-5 personnel and crew remained with the squadron when it was re-designated and transitioned to the new helicopter. Some former members of the disestablished HC-9 also joined the squadron.

HCS-5 was ultimately deactivated on 31 December 2006.

On 1 March 2012 the Blue Hawk name was resurrected by Helicopter Maritime Strike Squadron 78, HSM-78 when it was established on that date. In attendance were a contingent of HAL-5 personnel, most long retired, that were present to pass the torch to the new Blue Hawks.

== HH-1K gunships on display ==
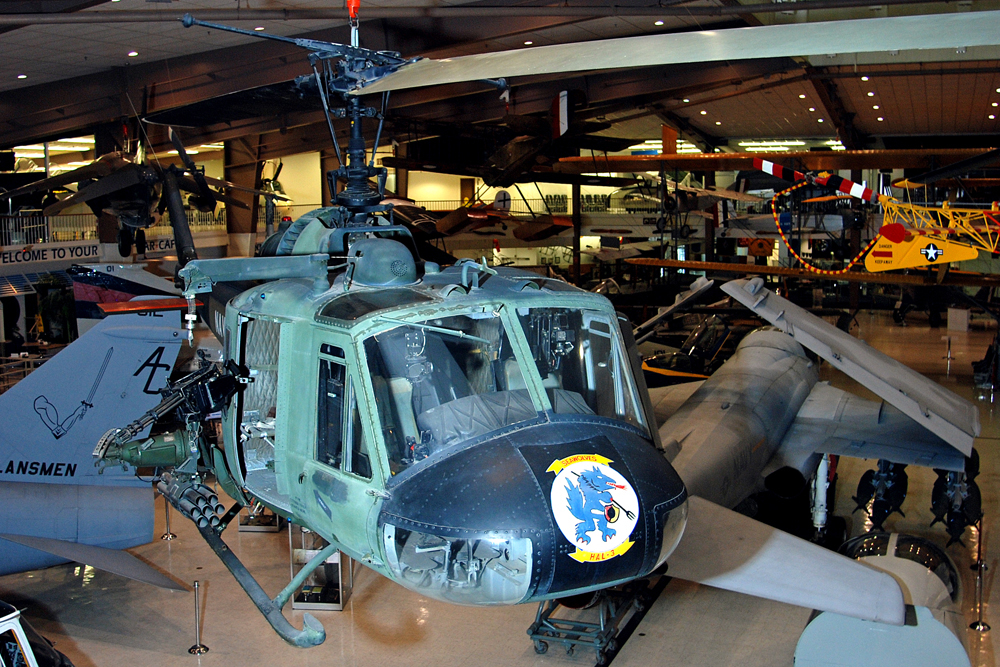
Former HH-1K from HA(L)-5 painted and configured to represent a HA(L)-3 Seawolf of the Vietnam War. Aircraft is on permanent display at the National Museum of Naval Aviation.

Although there are no longer Navy HH-1K Iroquois helicopters in U.S. Naval service, HA(L)-5's aircraft are still available to be seen. One of HA(L)-5's HH-1K is on static display at the National Museum of Naval Aviation. Although configured to represent the HA(L)-3 Seawolves aircraft 301 of the Vietnam War, it is in fact Navy Bureau Number 157188 of HA(L)-5. Another one of the HA(L)-5's HH-1K is still flying as part of the Ventura County, California Sheriff and Fire Department's Search and Rescue (SAR) Aerial unit. Although no longer painted in the original olive-drab, low-infrared paint, the former gunship can be seen in its new yellow and blue colors of Ventura County at Camarillo Airport, California. HH-1K NW305 is on display at the China Lake Museum of Armament and Technology. This aircraft was restored for the museum by former HAL-5 Bluehawk enlisted and officers. NW305 is slated to be refurbished in the near future again by the crewmen who originally flew and maintained her during her career as a gunship.

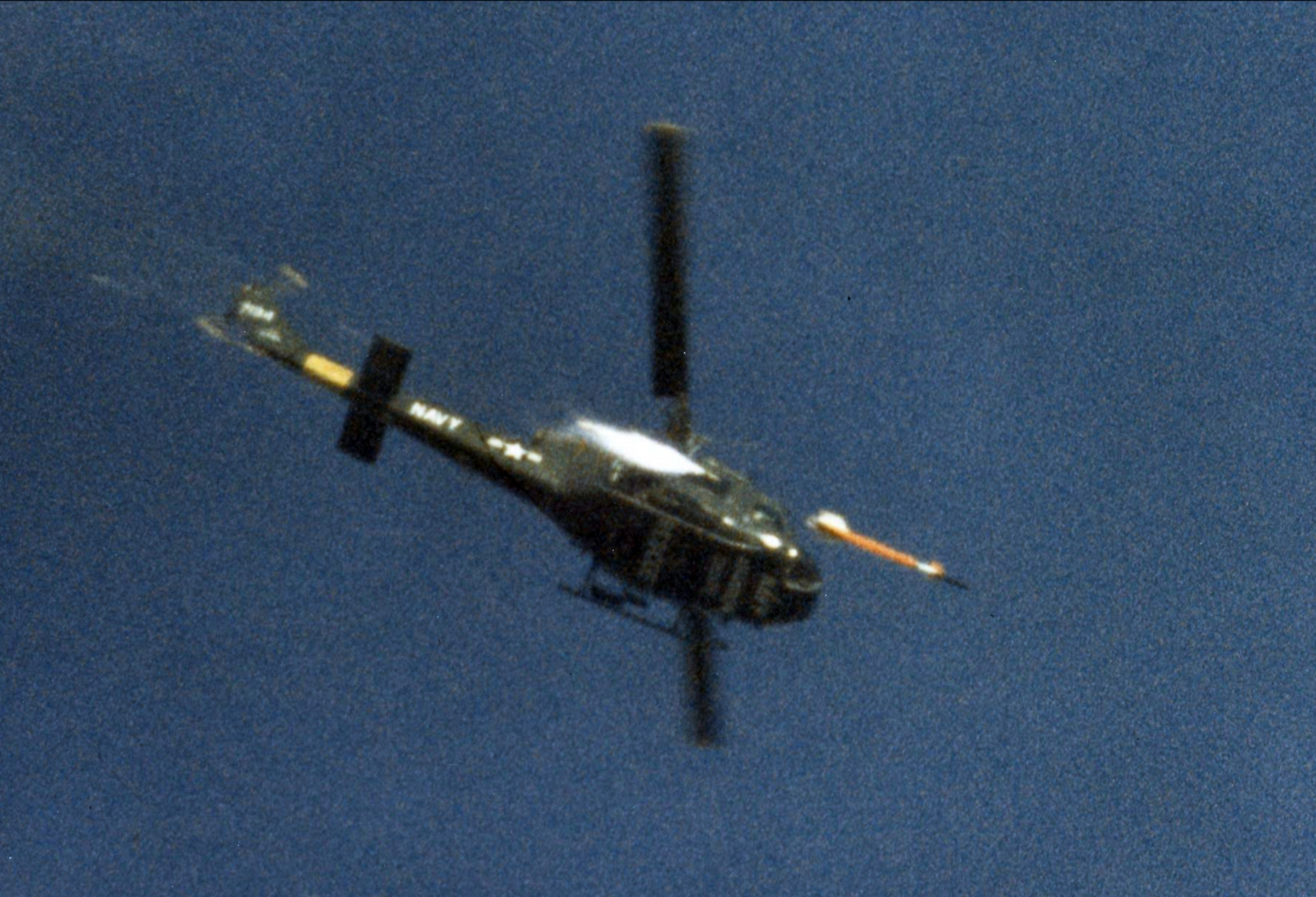
HH-1K testing a Sidewinder Missile at China Lake, CA

== See also ==
- History of the United States Navy
- List of United States Navy aircraft squadrons
