= Nam Can Naval Base =

Naval base in Vietnam

Site information
- Type: Navy
- Controlled by: Republic of Vietnam Navy; United States Navy

Location
- Coordinates: 8.755°N 104.948°E

Site history
- Built: 1969
- In use: 1969–75
- Battles/wars: Vietnam War

Nam Can Airfield
- IATA: none; ICAO: none

Summary
- Elevation AMSL: 7 ft (2.1 m)
- Interactive map of Nam Can Airfield

Runways
Direction	Length		Surface
Direction	ft	m	Surface
	2,800	853	asphalt

Nam Can Naval Base is a former Republic of Vietnam Navy (RVNN) and United States Navy base in the town of Năm Căn, Cà Mau province in the extreme south of Vietnam.

== History ==
Located at the extreme southern tip of South Vietnam, Năm Căn was a swampy fishing and charcoal-collecting village which had been overrun by the Viet Cong (VC) during the Tet Offensive and almost totally destroyed. The few primitive old roads were abandoned and useless. Until 1969 the area had been left to the VC.

U.S. leaders recognized that to sustain a military presence deep in the Cà Mau Peninsula they had to develop a permanent logistics capability in the region. The repair ships, self-propelled Barracks ships and Landing Ship, Tanks (LSTs) deployed to the Gulf of Siam in December 1968 were too distant from the inland operational areas so the Allies had to find another way to supply the riverine forces. Admiral Elmo Zumwalt ordered the construction of an Ammi barge pontoon base mid-point in the Cửa Lớn River opposite Năm Căn. Zumwalt hoped that the base afloat would serve as an essential element in an operation called Sea Float to assert the South Vietnamese government's presence in the Cà Mau region. The eventual 13-barge complex, a mobile advanced tactical support base (MATSB), provided berthing, messing, and supply support for U.S. Patrol Craft Fast (PCFs), riverine assault craft and patrol gunboats; RVNN ships and craft; and Navy SEALs. A Huey gunship from the HA(L)-3 detachment operated from a landing platform on one of the barges.

On the morning of 25 June 1969, Navy Dock landing ships towed the barges to the mouth of the Bo De where they were taken in tow by tugs and moored off Năm Căn. The weapons of the U.S. and South Vietnamese combat vessels as well as emplaced mortars and automatic weapons made Sea Float a defensive porcupine. The river's 6 to 8-knot current provided the most effective defense against VC swimmer-sappers.

In November 1969, COMUSMACV General Creighton Abrams endorsed Zumwalt's first-priority effort to establish a permanent South Vietnamese government presence in Cà Mau, in Operation Solid Anchor. Additional resources poured in. United States Air Force planes defoliated the terrain surrounding both Năm Căn and Sea Float with Agent Orange to deny the VC cover and concealment. South Vietnamese ground troops reinforced the area's defense forces. As security improved in the area civilians began to return to Năm Căn.

The initial building operation at Nam Can was to install a floating base on concrete pontoons to provide security while the Seabees worked on the shore to build an Advanced Tactical Support Base, called Solid Anchor, however the swampy sands weren't up to carrying the loads of a modern naval base, neither the heavy equipment nor the naval base structures. The contractor took over the dredging and fill needed for the base and a 3,000 feet (910 m) runway. Eventually, by 1970, Nam Can was going to need 640,000 cubic yards of fill to support a base and airfield. This meant a fill of 3–5 feet (0.91–1.52 m) on most of the base. The base eventually had 12 Butler buildings, 41 SEA huts and a fleet of 39 patrol boats of various kinds and about 1,000 people in the base population including RVNN dependent housing built by Seabees.

In April 1970, guards on Sea Float frustrated an attack by VC swimmer-sappers equipped with Soviet-made underwater gear and explosives, killing four VC with grenades and rifle fire. That July, mines tore a hole in USS Krishna anchored in the Cửa Lớn but failed to sink the ship. Later in the month the VC mined and capsized the RVNN's LSSL-225, killing 17 RVNN sailors.

In September 1970 the Solid Anchor base ashore was ready to take on the logistic support job and Sea Float was disestablished. Soon after that date, the Navy towed the Ammi barges out of the area to serve other needs.

In April 1971, the Navy turned over control of the Solid Anchor base which had cost US$50m to construct to the RVNN. American naval advisors continued to serve at Nam Can until February 1973, one month before the final withdrawal of all U.S. military personnel from South Vietnam. The RVNN 5th Coastal Flotilla operated 27 patrol craft from the base.
