= Binh Thuy Air Base =

Airbase in Vietnam

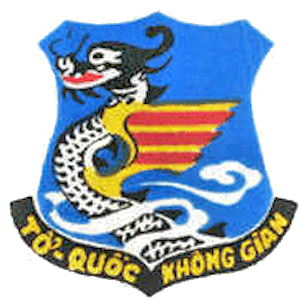
Binh Thuy Air Base
- Part of Republic of Vietnam Air Force (RVNAF); Pacific Air Forces (USAF); Vietnam Air Defence - Air Force (VN ADAF)
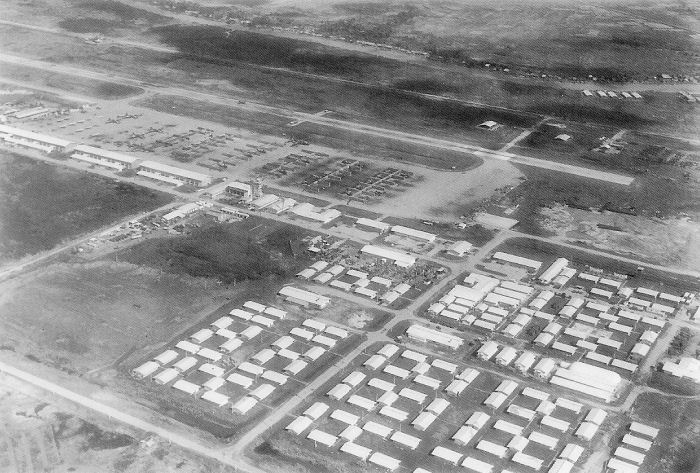
- Binh Thuy in 1967

Site information
- Type: Air Force Base
- Controlled by: Vietnam Air Defence - Air Force; Republic of Vietnam Air Force; United States Air Force
- Condition: Captured 1975 by PAVN, later used as a military airfield/civil airport

Location
- Coordinates: 10.0852°N 105.712°E

Site history
- Built: 1965
- In use: 1965–present
- Battles/wars: Vietnam War

Garrison information
- Occupants: 4th Air Division (RVNAF); 22nd Tactical Air Support Squadron (USAF)

Airfield information
- IATA: none; ICAO: none

Summary
- Elevation AMSL: 3 m (9.8 ft)
- Interactive map of Airfield information

Runways
Direction	Length		Surface
Direction	m	ft	Surface
06/24	2,404	7,887	Concrete

Binh Thuy Air Base (also known as Can Tho Air Base and Trà Nóc Air Base) is a military airfield located 7 km northwest of Cần Thơ in the Mekong Delta. During the Vietnam War it was used by the United States Air Force (USAF), United States Navy and the Republic of Vietnam Air Force (RVNAF). It is currently operated by the Vietnam Air Defence - Air Force (VNADAF).

== Construction ==
Since June 1962 USAF units had supported RVNAF operations at Cần Thơ Airfield.

In mid-1963 Military Assistance Command, Vietnam (MACV) proposed the construction of a 6,000-foot (1,800 m) runway at Cần Thơ to replace the existing 3,000-foot (910 m) runway at Sóc Trăng Airfield which was unsuitable for night and wet weather operations with a projected US$4.5 million construction cost and a 2-year construction period.

In January 1964 given the need for heavier aircraft to be available for quick reaction air support in the Mekong Delta, CINCPAC approved the construction of a new airfield at Cần Thơ for a cost of US$2.5 million to be ready within one year.

Construction of the new airfield began in February 1964. The selected site was low-lying swampland adjacent to the Bassac River and the Seabees operated a dredge on the Bassac 22 hours a day to produce landfill for the site. However the quality of the fill produced was poor and when the project passed to construction contractor RMK-BRJ they resorted to bringing in sand from elsewhere, eventually moving over 680,000 cubic yards of fill to create the 6,000 ft asphalt runway, taxi ramps and headquarters building.

== USAF use ==
On 8 May 1965 the 22nd Tactical Air Support Squadron equipped with 30 O-1 Bird Dogs was established at Binh Thuy.

In June 1965 the base became a forward operating location for AC-47 Spooky gunships of E Flight of the 4th Air Commando Squadron.

On 15 September 1965 Detachment 10, 38th Aerospace Rescue & Recovery Squadron equipped with 2 HH-43F helicopters deployed to the base to support flight operations.

On 20 February 1966 a VC mortar attack on the base was stopped by fire from one of the base's AC-47s as was another mortar attack on 8 July.

On 14 October 1967 following the activation of the 14th Air Commando Squadron at Nha Trang Air Base the AC-47s of E Flight, 4th Air Commando Squadron were replaced by 5 AC-47s of D Flight 14th Air Commando Squadron.

During the Tet Offensive, Viet Cong (VC) forces attacked the base with mortar and rocket fire and on 13 February launched a ground attack on base which was repulsed by USAF Security Police for no US or South Vietnamese losses.

On 26 June 1969, all AC-47s of D Flight, 3rd Special Operations Squadron which had absorbed the assets of 14th Air Commando Squadron, were flown to Nha Trang Air Base for transfer to the RVNAF.

On 20 December 1969 Detachment 10, 38th Aerospace Rescue & Recovery Squadron was disbanded.

On 15 January 1970 the 22nd Tactical Air Support Squadron left Binh Thuy and moved to Bien Hoa Air Base.

In February 1970 as part of the process of Vietnamization the USAF began handing over control of Binh Thuy to the RVNAF 4th Air Division and this was completed by the end of the year.

== US Navy use ==
On 25 September 1967 HA(L)-3 Detachment 7 was activated at the base, they would remain here until their deactivation in March 1972.

On 19 April 1969 Light Attack Squadron 4 (VAL-4) began combat operations, flying air support for the Mobile Riverine Force in the Mekong Delta. The missions included patrol, overhead air cover, scramble alert and gunfire/artillery spotting. On 31 March 1972 VAL-4 conducted its last combat mission prior to its disestablishment on 10 April 1972. On 11 April 1972 the US Navy Base at Binh Thuy was handed over to the Republic of Vietnam Navy.

== RVNAF use ==
In October 1964 the RVNAF 520th Fighter Squadron equipped with A-1Hs was formed at Bien Hoa AB, however due to delays in construction of the base it was only in December that they were able to start deploying a 5 aircraft detachment daily from Bien Hoa AB to Binh Thuy.

On 7 May 1967 an attack on the base destroyed 4 A-1Hs and 2 UH-34s.

By 1969 with the transfer of AC-47s to the RVNAF, 6 AC-47s of the 817th Combat Squadron were maintained on ground alert at the base.

== Fall of South Vietnam ==
As the southernmost RVNAF base, Binh Thuy remained operational until the end of the Vietnam War. In the 1975 Spring Offensive, the Army of the Republic of Vietnam 21st Division defended Binh Thuy from the attacking PAVN. On the morning of 30 April 1975 Binh Thuy based jets carried out the last known air strike of the war destroying two T-54 tanks of the People's Army of Vietnam 10th Division as they attempted to attack Tan Son Nhut Air Base.

== Accidents and incidents ==
- In early 1967 an AC-47 of the 4th Air Commando Squadron crashed on landing and was destroyed.
