= HSC-84 =

Helicopter Sea Combat Squadron 84
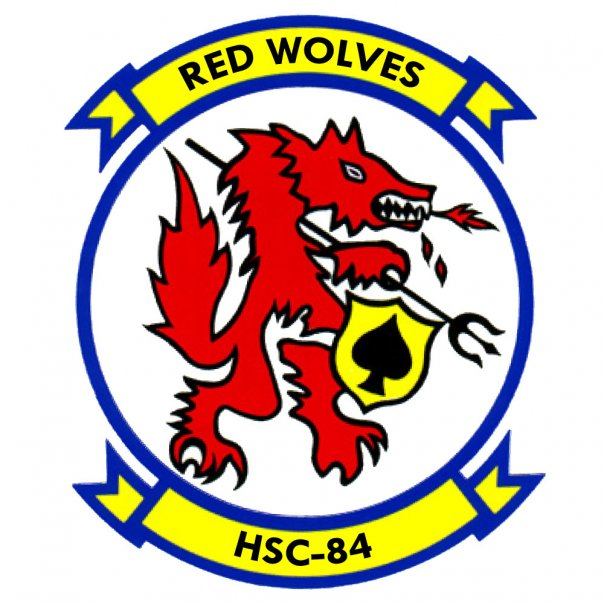
- Current HSC-84 insignia
- Active: 1 July 1976 – 19 March 2016
- Country: United States of America
- Branch: United States Navy
- Type: Helicopter
- Role: Special Warfare Support, Search and rescue, Combat search and rescue (CSAR)
- Part of: Helicopter Sea Combat Wing, US Atlantic Fleet
- Garrison/HQ: Naval Air Station Norfolk, Virginia
- Colors: Red & Yellow
- Mascot: Red Wolf
- Engagements: Operation Desert Storm; Operation Uphold Democracy; Operation Joint Endeavor; Operation Enduring Freedom; Operation Iraqi Freedom

Helicopter Sea Combat Squadron 84 (HSC-84) "Red Wolves" was a helicopter squadron of the United States Navy Reserve. Along with the "Firehawks" of HSC-85, the "Red Wolves" were one of only two squadrons in the U.S. Navy dedicated to supporting Navy SEAL and SWCC Teams, and Combat Search & Rescue. Prior to their deactivation in March 2016 they operated 14 HH-60H Rescue Hawks organized into four independent, two aircraft detachments that could deploy anywhere in the world within 72 hours of notice.

== History ==
HSC-84 was established on 1 July 1976 at NAS Norfolk, Virginia by CDR James L Poe, USNR and CDR Theodore G Sholl, USNR as Helicopter Attack Squadron (Light) Four (HAL-4) equipped with Bell HH-1K Huey gunships to provide dedicated aviation support for Naval Special Warfare (NSW), Explosive Ordnance Disposal (EOD) and Special Warfare Combatant-craft Crewmen (SWCC) Teams.

HAL-4 continued the traditions of its predecessor HAL-3 "Seawolves", which was established on 1 April 1967 in Vietnam as the only Helicopter Attack Squadron in the Navy. Operating the UH-1/HH-1, HAL-3 proved the concept of using specially outfitted naval helicopters to provide insertion/extraction and direct fire support, for Naval Special Warfare Teams and Riverine Forces. HAL-3 was disestablished 16 March 1972.

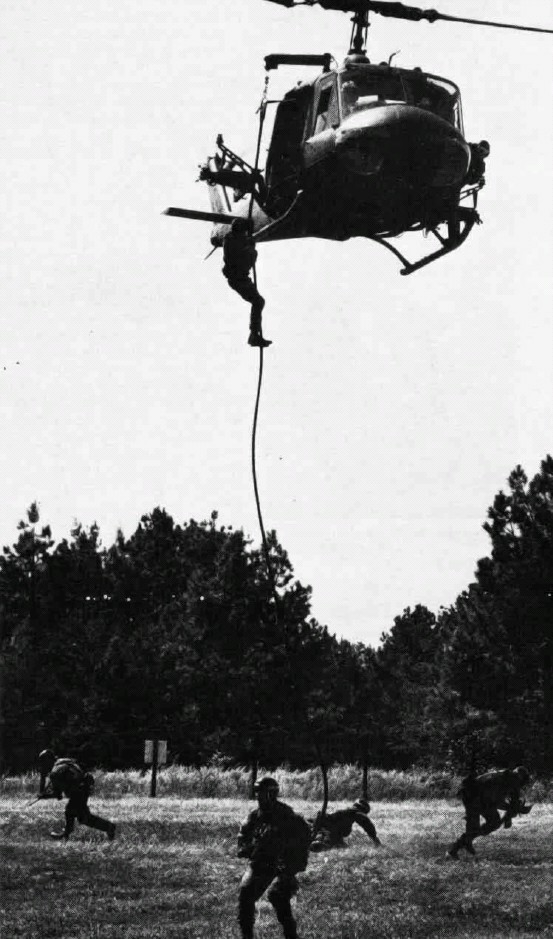
SEALs Fast Rope out of HH-1K of HA(L)-4

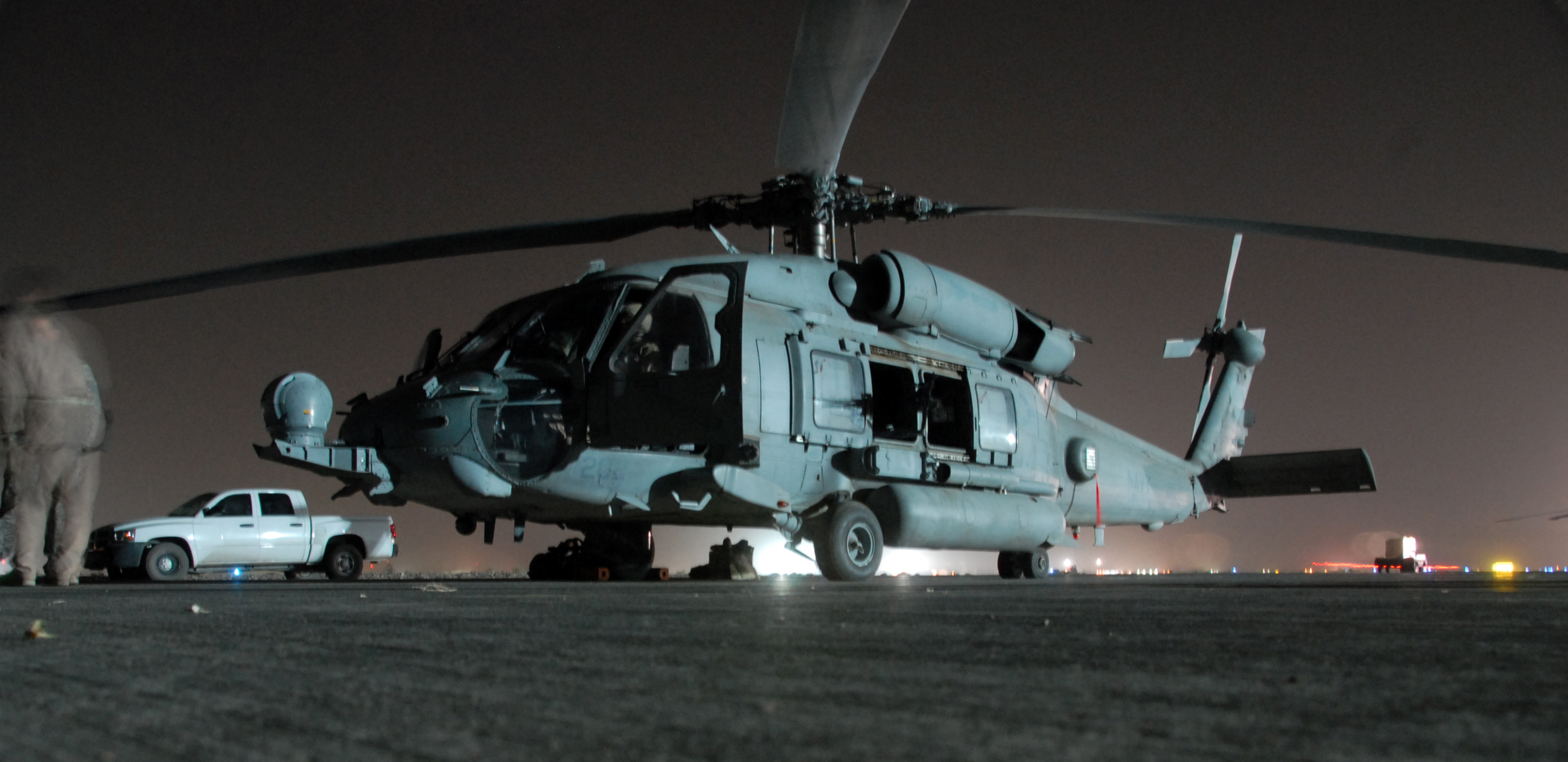
HH-60H at Balad Air Base in Iraq, 2008.

On 1 October 1989, HAL-4 was re-designated Helicopter Combat Support Special Squadron 4 (HCS-4). Along with a change in designation, HCS-4 also received the HH-60H Seahawk and added Strike Rescue to its primary mission of Naval Special Warfare support.

In December 1990, HCS-4 was mobilized and deployed one detachment to Saudi Arabia in support of Operation Desert Shield/Desert Storm marking the first use of the HH-60H in combat. Using the squadron's capability to independently deploy to remote sites, four helicopters with support personnel were based at RSAF Tabuk, Saudi Arabia and operated from forward bases at Al Jouf and Ar'Ar (an alert strip 10 miles (16 km) from the Iraqi border). Living in and operating out of tents, HCS-4 provided 24-hour Strike Rescue and Special Warfare support to coalition forces.

In September 1994, HCS-4 was once again called upon, this time in support of Operation Uphold Democracy in Haiti. In less than 48 hours, two aircraft with support personnel were equipped and ready for combat operations aboard ships of the Atlantic Fleet. The detachment initially deployed aboard the aircraft carrier USS Dwight D. Eisenhower before splitting into two single aircraft detachments, one crossdecking to the cruiser USS Vicksburg to provide Special Warfare support and the other to the destroyer USS Comte de Grasse for Strike Rescue Support.

In January 1996, HCS-4 deployed a one helicopter detachment in support of the aircraft carrier USS George Washington during its deployment to the Adriatic Sea for Operation Joint Endeavor. The detachment completed the squadron's first ever six-month deployment seamlessly integrating with Helicopter Anti-submarine Squadron 5 (HS-5) in support of operations in the Balkans.

In September 2001, HCS-4 was winding down a successful mini-detachment to Ft. Belvoir, Virginia when the morning of 11 September 2001 they received word of a terrorist attack on The Pentagon. Detachment personnel quickly loaded up one aircraft with medical supplies and launched it to the Pentagon. Upon arriving at the Pentagon the aircraft and crew maintained a standby alert posture for the next few days.

In March 2003, HCS-4 was once again called upon to deploy in support of Operation Noble Eagle and Iraqi Freedom. HCS-4 deployed four helicopters and support personnel to support this mission. Two helicopters and support personnel were stationed in Akrotiri, Cyprus. Two helicopters and support personnel were stationed on USS La Salle and the USS Nashville.

On 1 October 2006, HCS-4 was redesignated Helicopter Sea Combat Squadron Eight Four (HSC-84). HSC-84 continued to be the forefront in the U.S. Navy as the premier Rotary wing Special Operations support.

On 7 December 2014 Navy times posted, HSC-84 and 85 are scheduled to shut down in fiscal year 2016. That would likely force fleet helo pilots to pick up special operations missions, which Butcher characterized as a problematic plan since these missions require specialized flight training and gear.

A SOCOM spokesman referred a request for comment to the Navy.

"We're continuing to look at all options as we formulate our FY 16 budget, but at this point in time these options are all pre-decisional," Navy spokesman Lt. Rob Myers told Navy Times 21 Nov.. "As with our FY15 budget submission, we will balance requirements with affordability to ensure we are delivering the right capabilities to the operational commanders and support to our sailors in the fleet."

On 19 March 2016, after 40 years of service in support of United States special forces operations, the command was deactivated at Naval Station Norfolk.

== Insignia lineage ==
The Viet Cong had given the title "Seawolf" to HAL-3. In Vietnamese, their words for it would be "Shoi Ben". The colors on the shield are taken from the Republic of Vietnam Flag, the Ace of Spades is the card of death, the trident represents the squadrons' sea heritage, the flame their power to sustain. Many of the aspects of the original HAL-3 logo were kept, with the exceptions of the blue wolf and the color of the shield. The wolf was inspired by the Löwenbräu beer's logo (showing actually a lion).

== See also ==
- History of the United States Navy
- List of United States Navy aircraft squadrons
