= HA(L)-3 =

US Navy Helicopter Attack Squadron (Light) 3

Helicopter Attack Squadron (Light) 3
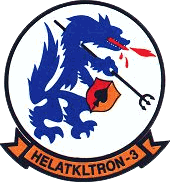
- HA(L)-3 squadron patch
- Active: 1 April 1967 - 16 March 1972
- Country: United States
- Branch: United States Navy
- Type: Naval special operations aviation unit
- Role: Aerial ambulance helicopter escort Aerial reconnaissance Air assault Airlift; Air-sea rescue Airstrike; Close air support Combat search and rescue Medical evacuation Search and destroy Special operations
- Size: Squadron
- Nickname: Seawolves
- Engagements: Vietnam War

HA(L)-3, (Helicopter Attack Squadron (Light) 3), nicknamed the "Seawolves", was a naval special operations aviation squadron unit in the United States Navy (USN) formed in support of United States Naval Special Warfare Command (USNSWC) operations and Mobile Riverine Forces (MRFs) during the Vietnam War.

== Beginnings of the Navy helicopter gunship ==
Prior to the Vietnam War, the helicopter was a valued tool within the United States Army (USA) for aerial reconnaissance, airlift, medical evacuation (MEDEVAC) of wounded, and search and rescue (SAR). Helicopters within the USN were used for marine amphibious envelopment, search and rescue, vertical replenishment (VERTREP), and experimentally, as naval mine sweepers. As an offensive weapon, the Navy developed the helicopter as an anti-submarine warfare aircraft, developing the capability to carry and launch aerial torpedoes. As an offensive weapon for ground-based targets, the helicopter was relatively ignored in favor of traditional, fixed-wing aircraft.

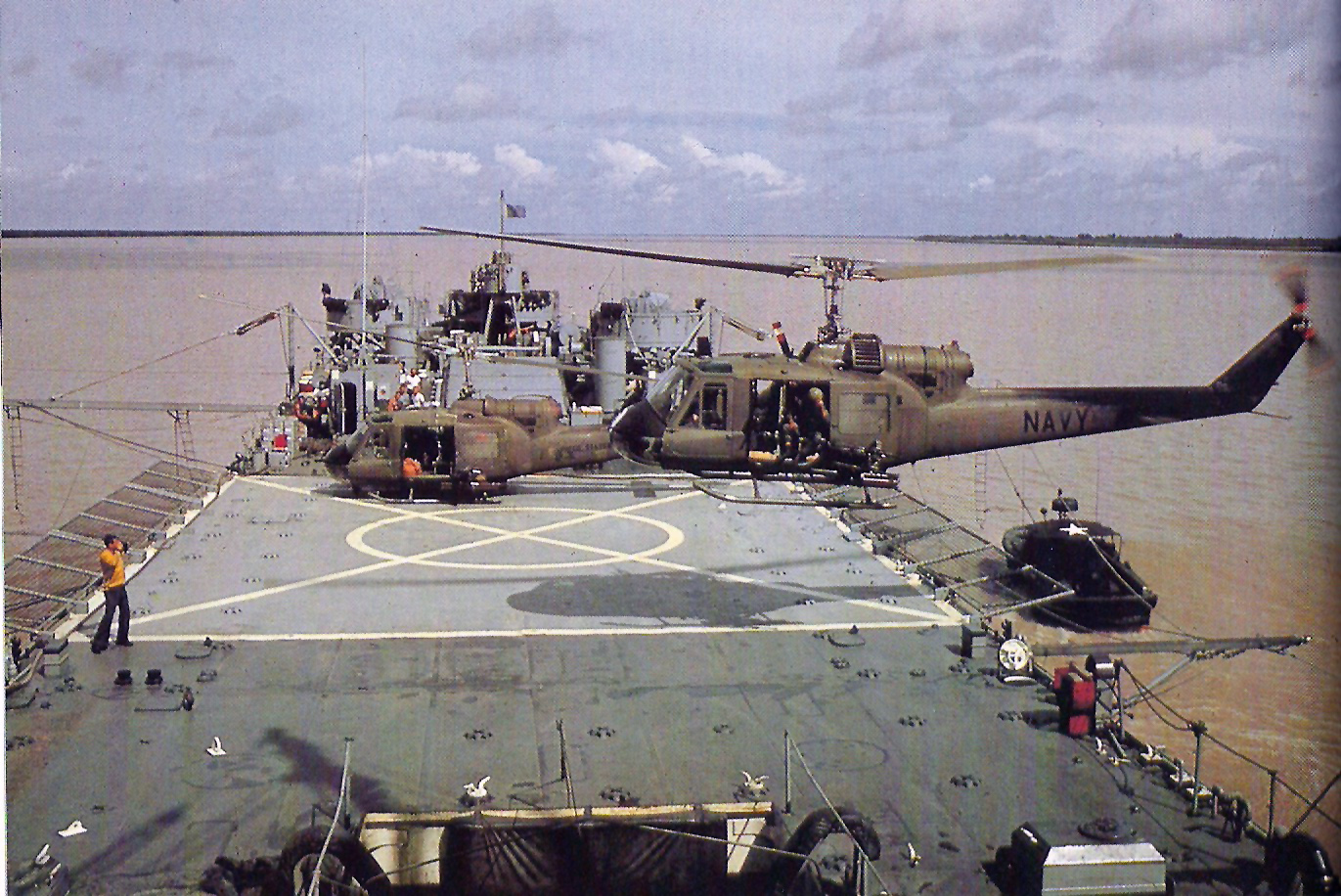
A UH-1E of HA(L)-3 landing on USS Harnett County (LST-821), October 1967.

In 1965, the US Navy began joint operations off the southern coast of South Vietnam in support of the growing war. In the same year, the Navy began limited Mobile Riverine Forces operations in the Mekong Delta, disrupting the Viet Cong's lines of communications, locating supply caches, and eliminating tax collecting stations. Based on the "Brown-water navy" Navy's early success, a commitment was made to continue river operations on a full-scale basis in the Mekong Delta. It was also determined that key to the survival of the boats operating in the rivers would be close air support (CAS).

Initially, the Brown-water Navy was supported by elements of the US Army's 145th Combat Aviation Battalion who had greater experience in helicopter gunship operations and tactics. Operating off a "Mothership", the USS Belle Grove, the Army and Navy worked together on Operation Jackstay. Although the joint effort was a success, it was felt that Naval aircrewman and Naval aviator would be more suitable for the mission, especially since the mission would require the pilots and crews to operate off the deck of ships in all weather conditions, day and night. This, coupled with Army's pilots and aircrews lack of training in shipboard operations, identified a need for a dedicated, United States Navy, helicopter gunship program in Vietnam.

== The birth of the HA(L)-3 and the Seawolves ==
In 1966, rotary wing support was originated as part of the response to the ongoing war in South Vietnam. Starting with Helicopter Combat Support Squadron ONE (HC-1), detachments of helicopter gunships transferred to the Navy to conduct combat operations in the Mekong Delta region of South Vietnam. HC-1 operated two-aircraft detachments of Army UH-1B gunships, staged from shore bases and patrol craft tenders. Providing a quick reaction, close air support (CAS) role for units of the Brown-water Navy, the effectiveness of the helicopter attack mission was quickly realized.

In response, the Navy began to widen the mission requirements. This created a need for a specific squadron in support of the mission requirements. In April 1967, HC-1 was divided into four separate units, Helicopter Sea Combat Squadron THREE (Navy Vertical Replenishment), Helicopter Combat Support Squadron Five, Helicopter Combat Support Squadron Seven (Navy Combat Search and Rescue), and Helicopter Attack Squadron (Light) 3, nicknamed the Seawolves.

In 1966, the Navy sent a message fleet-wide, asking for volunteer Naval Aviators to man HA(L)-3. From the response, eighty Aviators were chosen to be the first "Seawolves" and transferred to Vietnam. On 1 April 1967, HA(L)-3 was officially established in South Vietnam under the command of LCDR Joseph B. Howard.

The wolf on the patch was inspired by the lion logo on a Löwenbräu beer can; a trident as a symbol for the Navy was added, and a shield with a spade as a symbol for death with red and yellow colours as found on the flag of South Vietnam.

== Fighting in Vietnam ==
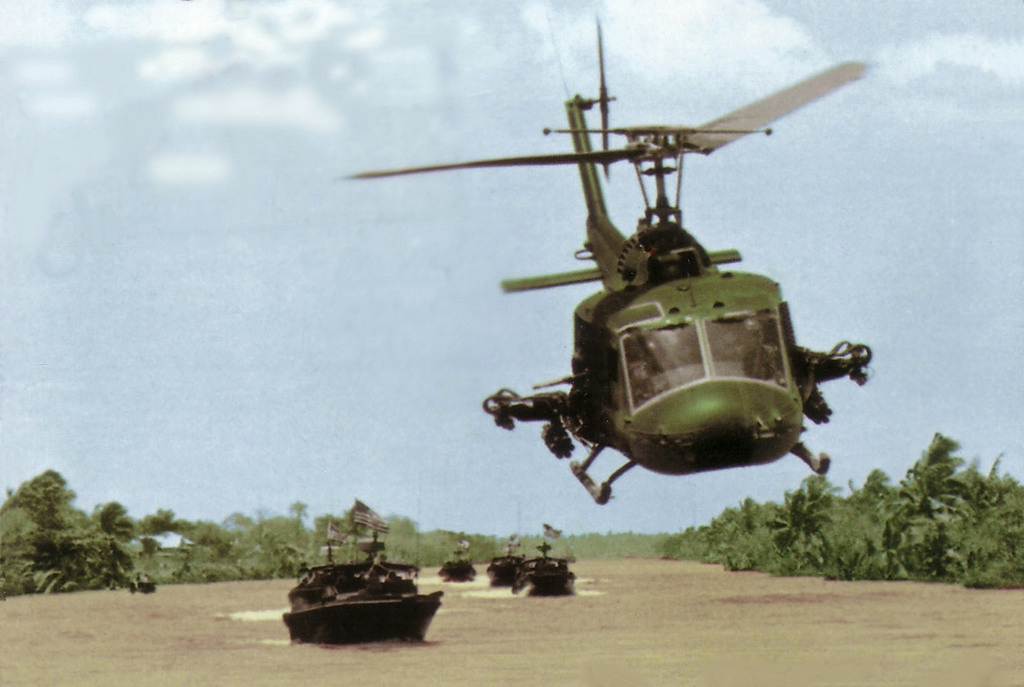
A HA(L)-3 UH-1E escorting a river patrol, circa 1968.

The Seawolves would see their first major action while still part of a detachment of HC-1. On 31 October 1966, two Navy boats encountered a superior force of over 80 boats transferring a Viet Cong battalion. Encountering fierce resistance from them, the Navy boat commanders requested close air support. Scrambling and arriving within approximately fifteen minutes, the Seawolves would claim 16 Viet Cong boats sunk or destroyed.

The squadron was activated on 1 April 1967 at a commissioning ceremony at Vung Tau Air Base with four detachments: Detachment 1 (formerly HC-1 Detachment 29) on USS Hunterdon County; Detachment 2 (formerly HC-1 Detachment 27) at Nhà Bè Base; Detachment 3 (formerly HC-1 Detachment 25) at Vĩnh Long Airfield and Detachment 4 (formerly HC-1 Detachment 21) on USS Jennings County.

By August 1967, the squadron had grown to eight two-helicopter detachments based at Vung Tau, Binh Thuy Air Base, Đồng Tâm Base Camp, Vĩnh Long, and Nhà Bè and on LSTs anchored on the Hàm Luông, Cổ Chiên and Bassac Rivers.

After the activation of HA(L)-3 missions included aerial ambulance helicopter escort, aerial reconnaissance, airlift, air-sea rescue, airstrike, close air support, combat search and rescue, medical evacuation, search and destroy, special operations, and supporting SEAL Teams insertion and extraction. From its inception the squadron were designed as a quick-reaction force. Two ship formations would stand alert for 24-hour shifts and respond to close air support requests up to 50 miles (80 km) away from their base. The squadron fell under the command of Task Force 116 and was originally deployed to support Patrol Boat, River (PBR) operations, but in time the squadron found themselves supporting Task Force 117 operations and even Army forces.

=== 1969 ===
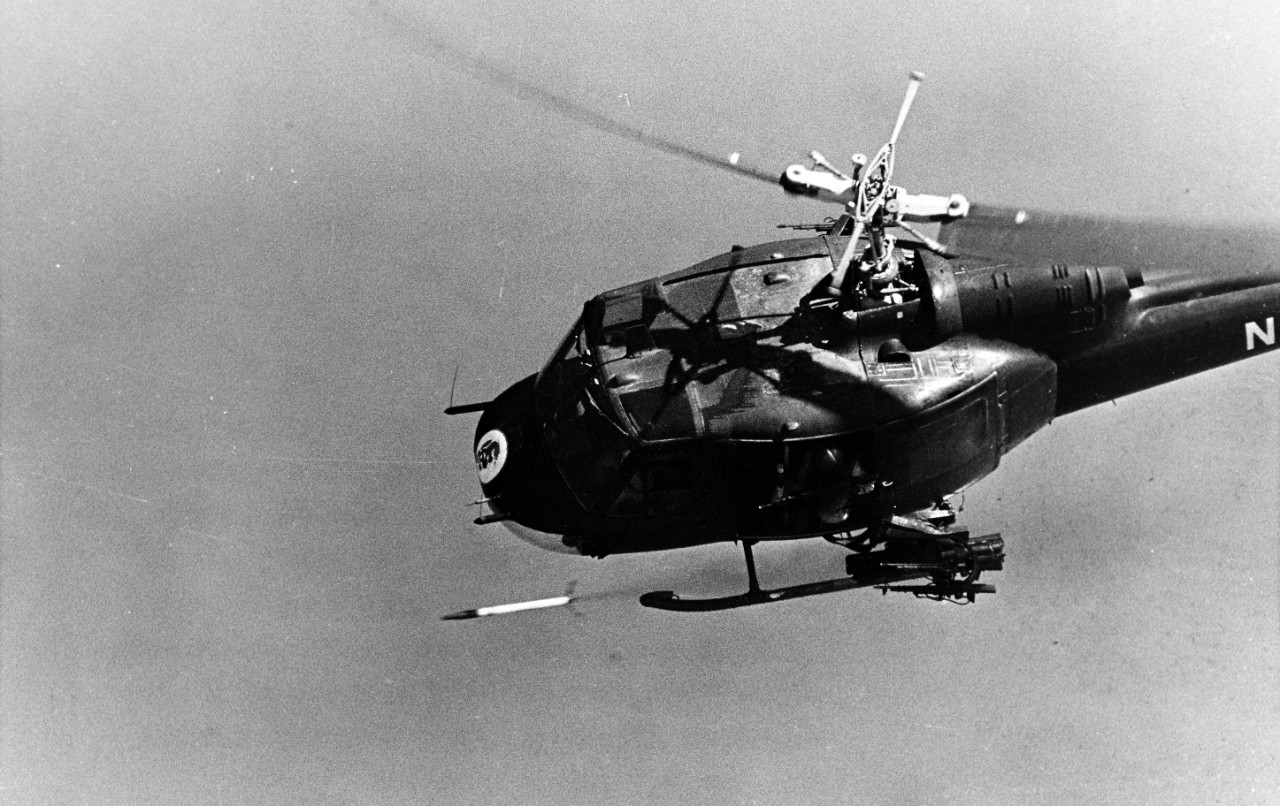
HA(L)-3, Detachment Three UH-1E fires a 2.75-inch rocket, October 1969

In March Seawolf 305 crashed due to engine failure killing two crewmen. On 23 April a helicopter from Detachment 3 hit a power cable and crashed at Cu Chi Base Camp killing one crewman. On 28 April Seawolf 320 crashed killing three crewmen and Seawolf 305 made a forced landing nearby and one crewman was killed during the extraction. In August Seawolf 331 crashed on takeoff killing one crewman and Seawolf 300 was shot down. On 15 September Seawolf 302 crashed on takeoff from USS Harnett County killing two crewmen. In December Seawolf 313 crashed killing one crewman.

=== 1970 ===
On 20 February Cambodian authorities returned the remains of two US Navy crewmen whose helicopter crashed in Cambodia on 28 April 1969. On 29 March Detachment 3 helicopters supported the defense of Chi Lang Special Forces Camp. On 13 April Seawolf 315 ditched in the Gulf of Thailand on approach to USS Garrett County. On 9 May squadron helicopters began operations in support of the Cambodian campaign. On 22 May Seawolf 302 was shot down and later destroyed by an airstrike. On 1 June a squadron helicopter crashed at Binh Thuy killing three crewmen. On 5 July Seawolf 325 made an emergency landing, the crew was extracted and the helicopter recovered the next day. On 13 August a squadron helicopter crashed on takeoff at Binh Thuy. On 15 September Seawolf 312 and Seawolf 313 were shot down while escorting a medevac helicopter with two crewmen killed. On 3 October Seawolf 306 crash-landed at Cà Mau killing one crewman. On 16 November a Detachment 7 helicopter crashed near Đồng Tâm. On 26 November a squadron helicopter ditched in the Gulf of Thailand. On 19 December Seawolf 312 crashed southeast of Kien Long killing all four crewmen.

=== 1971 ===
On 17 February a squadron UH-1B experienced engine failure and ditched in the Gulf of Thailand. On 8 March a UH-1C experienced engine failure and autorotated into seawater causing irreparable structural damage. On 7 April during a practice autorotation at Cà Mau a UH-1B crashed and was destroyed. On 19 April a UH-1B received fire resulting in a rocket exploding and killing a door gunner. On 28 May a UH-1B was destroyed by a 75mm recoilless rifle round on the deck of YRBM-21. On 28 August Seawolf 316 was hit by ground fire and ditched. On 30 August a UH-1 was shot down and later destroyed on the ground. On 20 September Seawolf 322 disintegrated in mid-air over Hậu Nghĩa Province killing all four crewmen. On 18 October Seawolf 11 spun into water during hoisting operations and was damaged beyond repair.

=== 1972 ===
On 26 January 1972 the squadron commenced standdown. On 3 February Detachment 6 at Phu Loi Base Camp was disestablished. On 6 February Detachment 1 at Nam Can Naval Base was disestablished. On 10 February Detachment 7 at Đồng Tâm Base Camp was disestablished. On 14 February Detachment 5 at Châu Đốc was disestablished. On 18 February Detachment 8 at Rạch Giá was disestablished. On 19 February Detachment 4 was disestablished. On 23 February Detachment 3 at Cà Mau was disestablished. On 26 February Detachment 2 at Nhà Bè Base was disestablished. On 2 March Detachment 9 at Binh Thuy Air Base was disestablished. On 6 March the squadron's last gunship was retrograded. On 16 March the squadron completed stand-down procedures and was disestablished.

By the time of their decommissioning on 16 March 1972, The Seawolves flew over 120,000 combat sorties over South Vietnam and Cambodia. Over 200 Seawolves would be wounded in combat and 44 would be killed in action.

== Post Vietnam War developments ==
It would take the Navy four years from the disestablishment of HA(L)-3 to realize that it still had a need for this type of specialized, special warfare aviation support. With the establishment of Helicopter Attack Squadron (Light) Four (HA(L)-4) and Helicopter Attack Squadron (Light) Five (HA(L)-5) in 1976 and 1977, the Navy Gunships would once again join the fleet, though in the United States Navy Reserve. Although these two units would never see combat as HA(L) squadrons, they would later go on to see combat in Operation Desert Shield/Storm, Operation Uphold Democracy, Operation Joint Endeavor, Operation Enduring Freedom and Iraq War as Helicopter Sea Combat Squadron 84 (HSC-84) and HA(L)-5.

== See also ==
- History of the United States Navy
- List of United States Navy aircraft squadrons
- Experimental Military Unit - Joint helicopter squadron consisting of US Army and Royal Australian Navy helicopter pilots that operated in the Mekong River delta during the Vietnam War
