= List of boat builders =

This is a list of boat builders, for which there is a Wikipedia article.

== Motorboats (<50 feet) ==
- A.F. Theriault & Sons Shipyard
- American Skier
- Andrée & Rosenqvist
- Bayliner
- Beneteau
- Benetti
- Blohm + Voss
- Boston Whaler
- Brunswick Boat Group
- Burger Boat Company
- Cantieri di Pisa
- Carter Marine
- Carver Yachts
- Centurion Boats
- Chaparral Boats
- Chris-Craft Corporation
- Cimmarron Boats
- Clyde Boats
- Cobalt Boats
- Codecasa
- Correct Craft
- Cruisers Yachts
- Evinrude
- Ferretti Group
- Feadship
- Front Street Shipyard
- Glastron
- HanseYachts
- Herbert Woods
- Horizon Yachts
- Hylas Yachts
- ICON Yachts
- Jade Yachts
- Jeanneau
- Johnson Yachts
- KaiserWerft
- Kadey-Krogen Yachts
- Lazzara
- Lürssen
- Lowe Boats
- Malibu Boats
- MasterCraft
- Maxum
- Mondomarine
- Nautique
- Nobiskrug
- Ocean Alexander
- Oceanco
- Pearson Yachts
- Perini Navi
- Porta-bote
- Princess Yachts
- Royal Yacht
- Sea Ray
- Ski Nautique
- StanCraft Boat Company
- Su Marine Yachts
- Sunseeker
- Ta Shing
- Tayana Yachts
- Tiara Yachts
- Tollycraft
- Trojan Yachts
- Uniflite
- Wacanda Marine
- Wally Yachts
- Yamaha Motor Corporation

== Sailboats ==
- Amel Yachts
- Bavaria Yachtbau
- Beneteau
- Dufour Yachts
- Hallberg-Rassy
- Jeanneau
- J/Boats
- Nautor's Swan
- O'Day Corp.
- Pearson Yachts
- Pogo Structures
- Sunseeker

== Catamarans ==
- Farrier Marine
- Four Winns
- Lagoon

== Trimarans ==
- Corsair Marine
- Farrier Marine

== Watersports, dinghies, launches & tenders ==
- Bombardier
- Boston Whaler
- Bossoms Boatyard
- Corsair Marine
- Honda Marine Group
- Kawasaki Heavy Industries
- Karmin International
- Thunder Tiger
- Yamaha Motor Corporation
- Zodiac Group
- Z1 Boats

== See also ==
- Boat
- List of boat types
- List of sailboat designers and manufacturers
- Rigid Inflatable Boat
- Sailing
- Sailing (sport)
- Ski boat
- Yacht racing
