= Balboa Yacht Club =

Boating association located in Newport Beach, California

- Burgee
- Founded: 1922
- Location: 1801 Bayside Dr Corona del Mar, Newport Beach (CA)
- Website: www.balboayachtclub.com

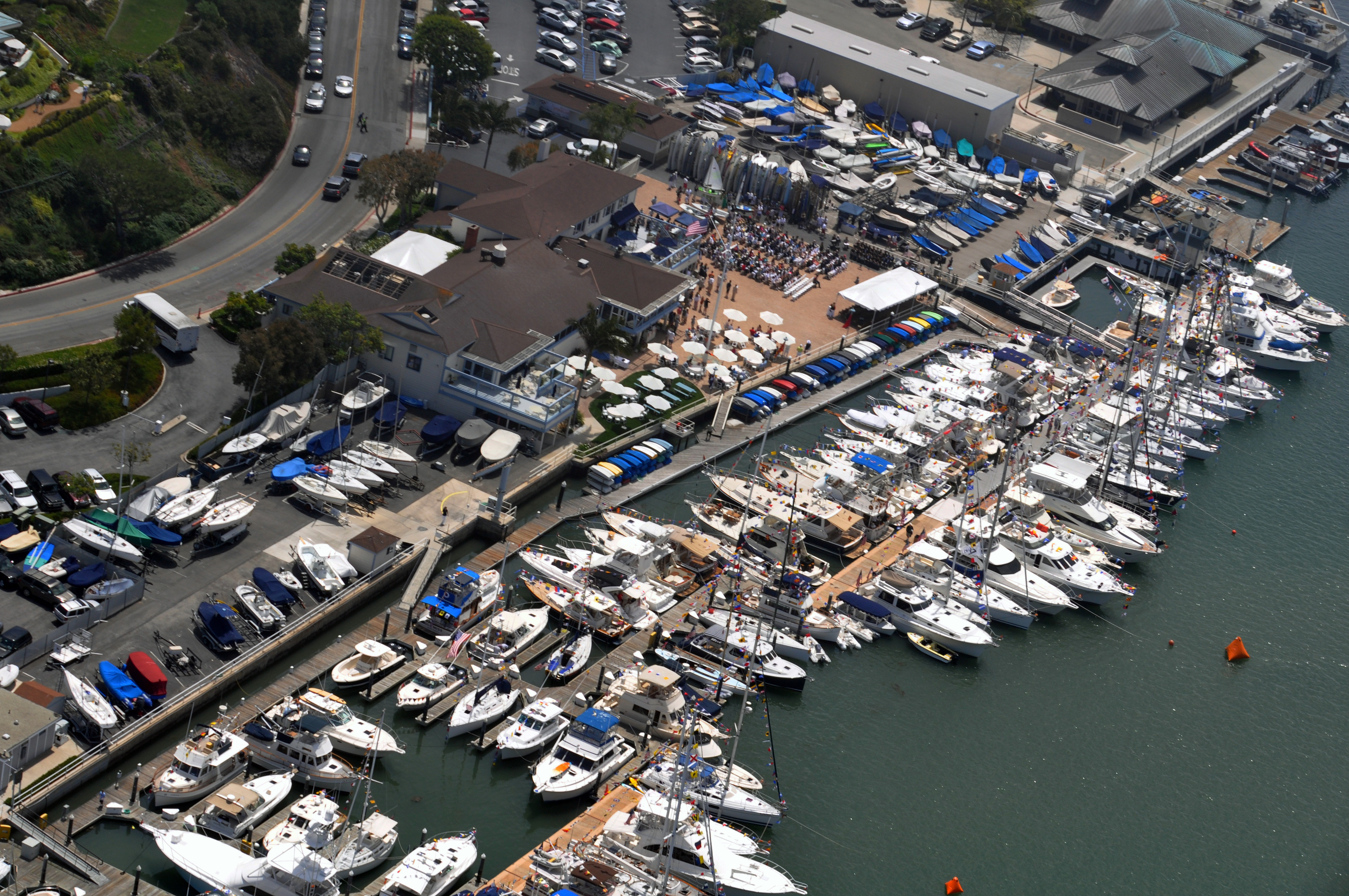
The Balboa Yacht Club

Balboa Yacht Club (BYC) is a yacht club located in Corona del Mar, Newport Beach, Orange County, California. It is located near the entrance of the Newport Harbor.

== History ==
BYC was founded in 1922 as the Southland Sailing Club, and was soon renamed to the Balboa Yacht Club. BYC has an outstation on Catalina Island, in Whites Cove, west of Avalon.

== Facilities ==
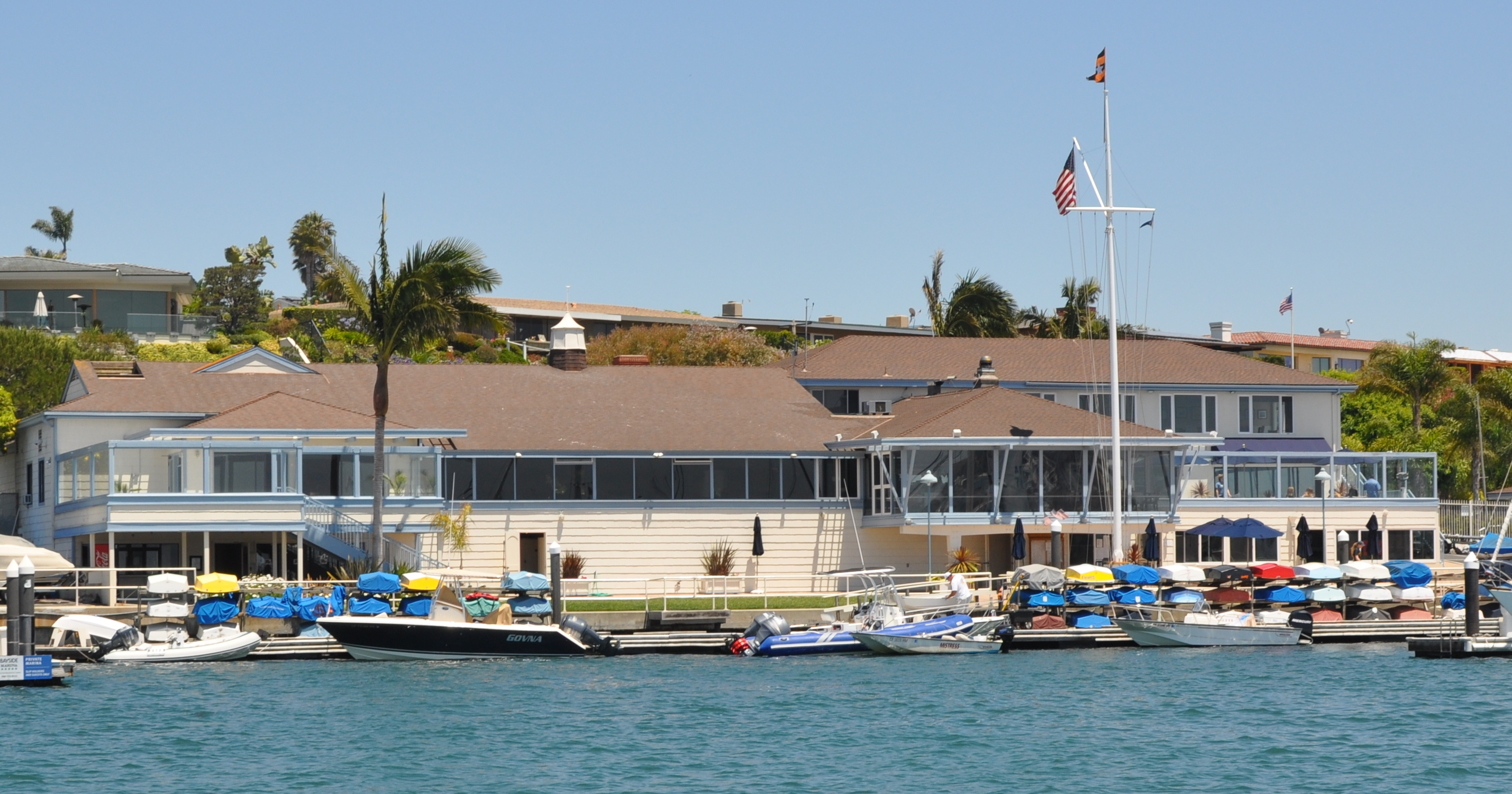
Balboa Yacht Club clubhouse

The facility has a main dining room and outdoor seating, and a pavilion equipped with a barbecue and snack bar. It provides mooring cans, plus both wet and dry boat slips for members and guests for a monthly fee. The wet slips can accommodate boats up to 55 feet in length, and dry slips and a three-ton crane for smaller boats up to 25 feet in length as well as a dinghy launch and storage. The club is open five days a week, plus a full-time dock staff and shore boat.

There is additionally a satellite facility located at Whites Landing on Santa Catalina Island. This location offers members a small anchorage, and a beach to stay at while boating about the island. There are a few tents available for those on vessels not suited to sleeping, and a large communal grill is lit in the evening for cooking. There are kayaks available for use, as well as a volleyball court.

== Fleets ==
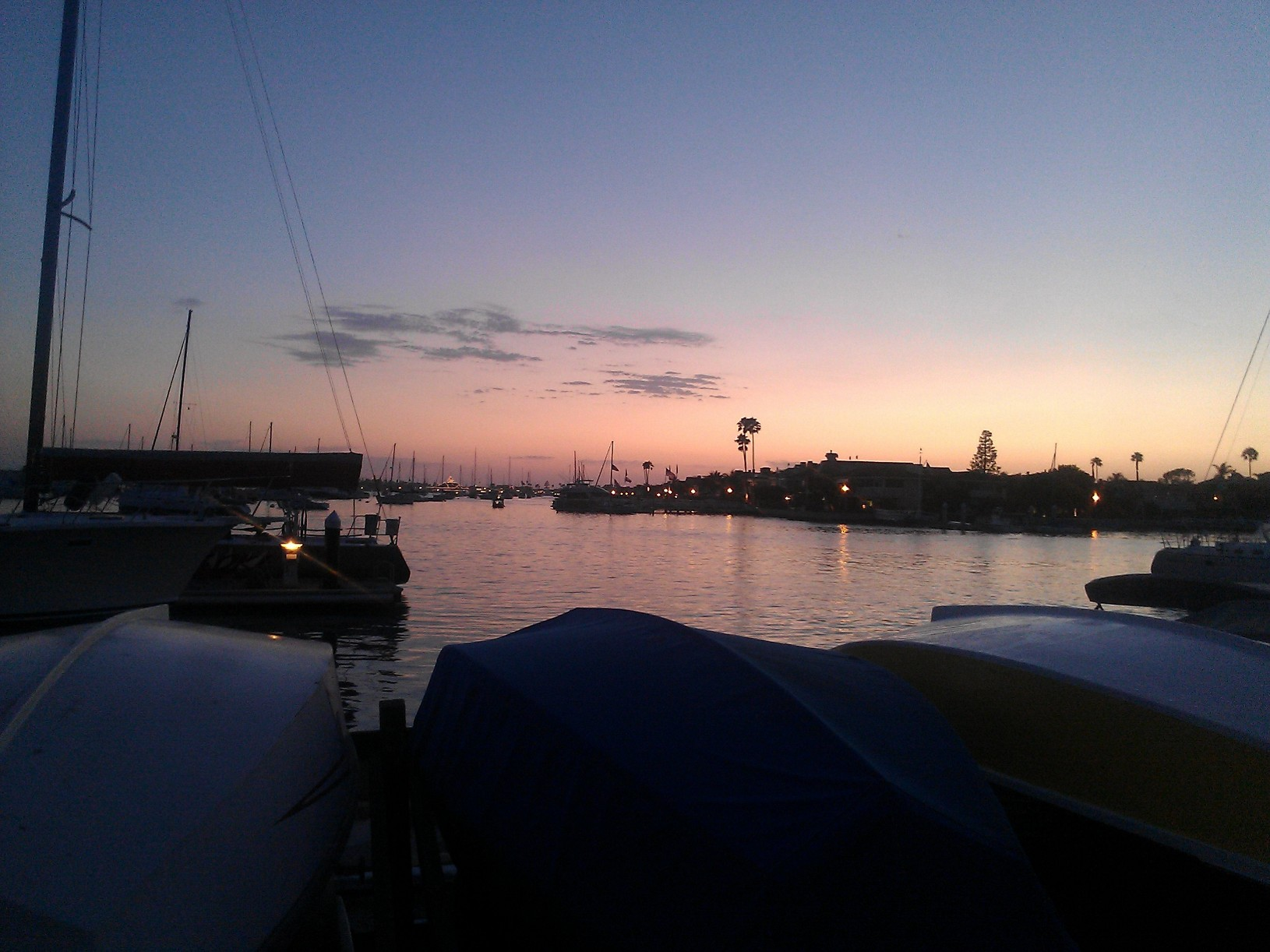
Balboa Yacht Club, 2012

Balboa Yacht Club is home to multiple fleets, many of are used to be raced regularly. There are fleets of Naples Sabot, FJs, Harbor 20s, and an adult Sabot fleet. Most of the larger boats race outside of Newport Harbor in the Pacific Ocean. It is the home of the Thursday night "Beer Can Races".

== Sailors ==
Balboa's skippers Bob White and Bob Davis won the Snipe world championships in 1945 and 1946 respectively, and Jack Franco and Renee Vesterby the North Americans in 1990. David Ullman won the 470 World Championships in 1977, 1978 and 1980, the Melges 24 World Championships in 2007 and the Clifford Day Mallory Cup in 1980.

== Junior Sailing Program ==
The club has a large junior sailing programs which includes a full-time junior program director, coaches, maintenance and administrative staff. Facilities include a junior clubhouse, tool room, Sabot and Laser storage spaces, sail and boat wash areas crane and launching ramp.

Members have access to the junior charter fleet that includes Sabots, Lasers, CFJ's & C420's. Also included in the fleet are the BYC Jr. race committee boat, Whaler chase boats, inflatables, and multi-boat trailers for travel to away regattas.

Throughout the year, events are scheduled for sailors of all ability levels including special events, field trips, racing clinics, a very active after-school program, and practices. During the summer months, the Junior Program offers summer sailing and racing program.

== Regattas ==
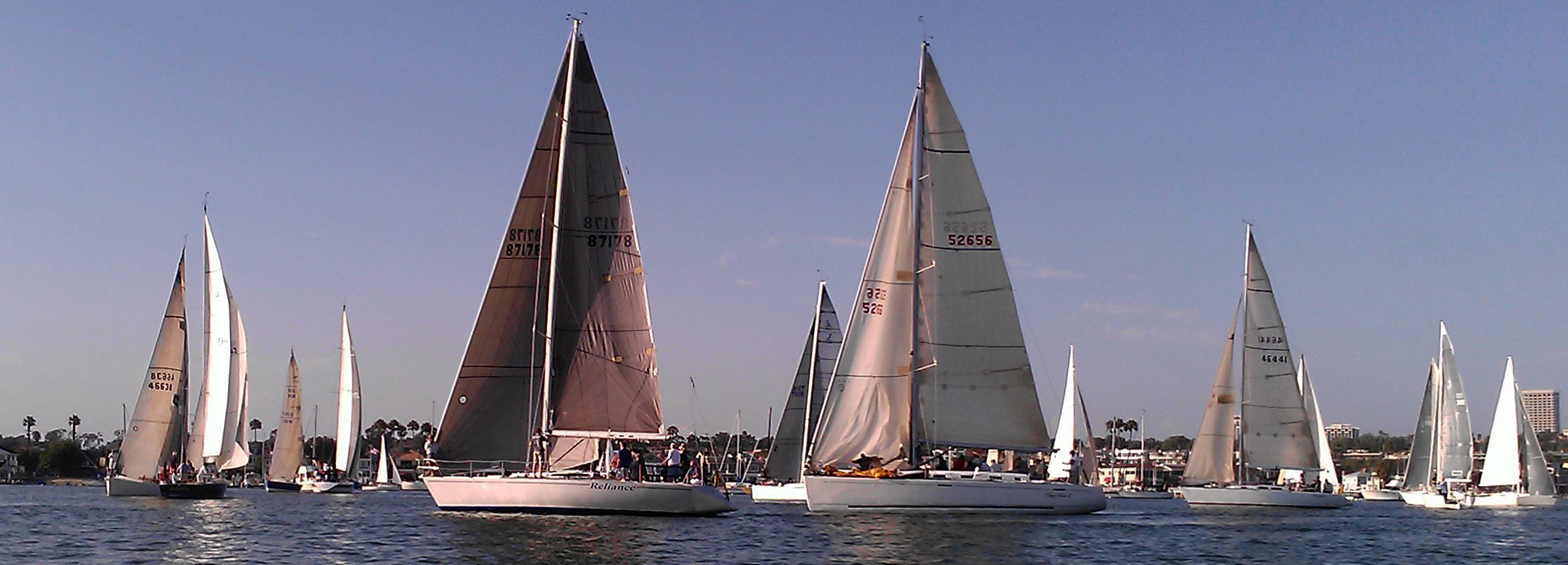
Beer can yachts at the start of a race

The Balboa Yacht Club is the home of many national and international regattas each year, featuring some of the most predominate racing yachts in the Southern California area.

- Annual CDM to Cabo San Lucas race
- Annual Governor's Cup
- Thursday Night Beer Can Races
- 2012 FJ National Championships

== Governor's Cup ==
The Governor's Cup is a youth match racing sailing regatta held annually by the Balboa Yacht Club.

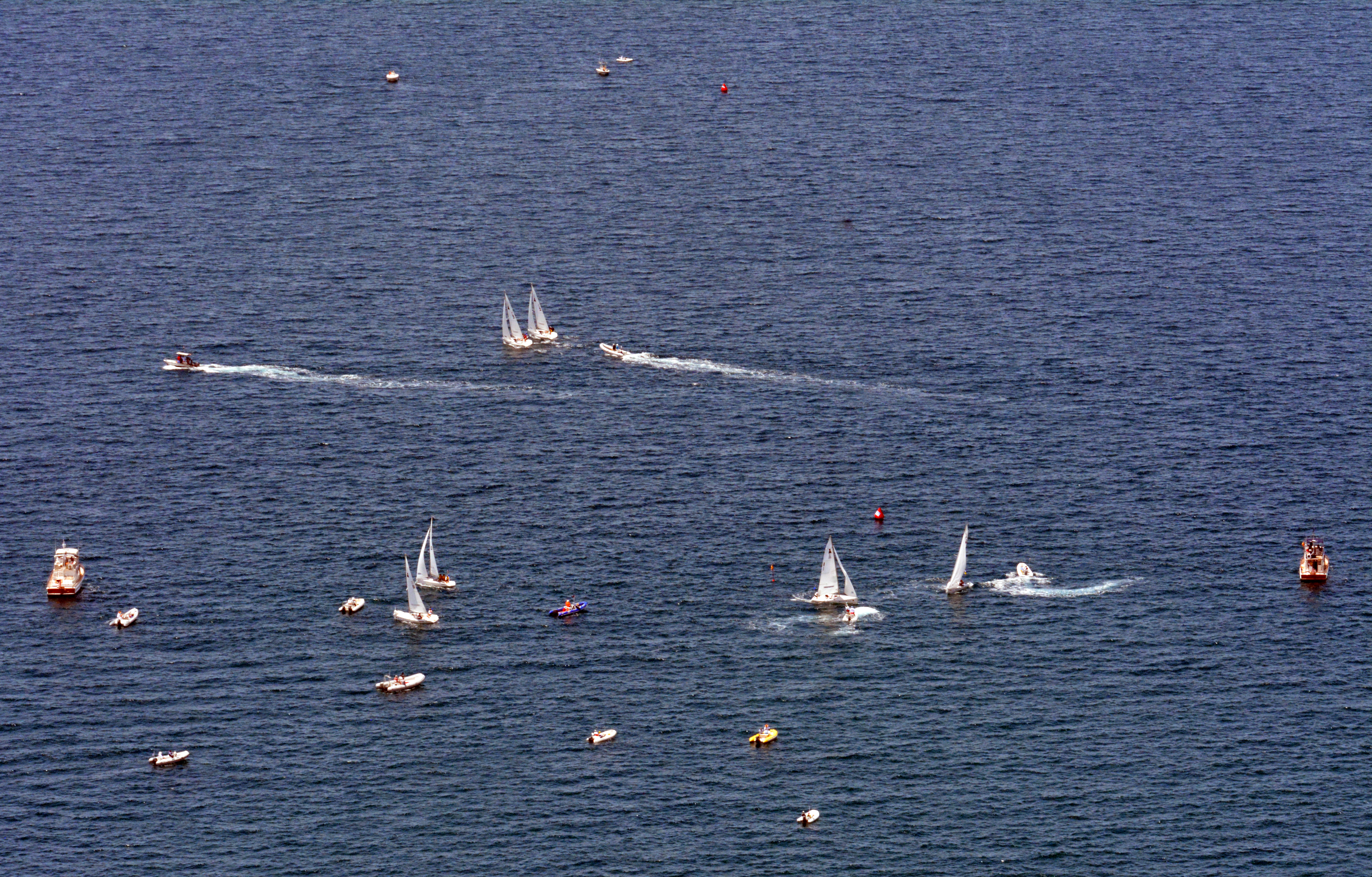
BYC Governors Cup, July 18, 2014

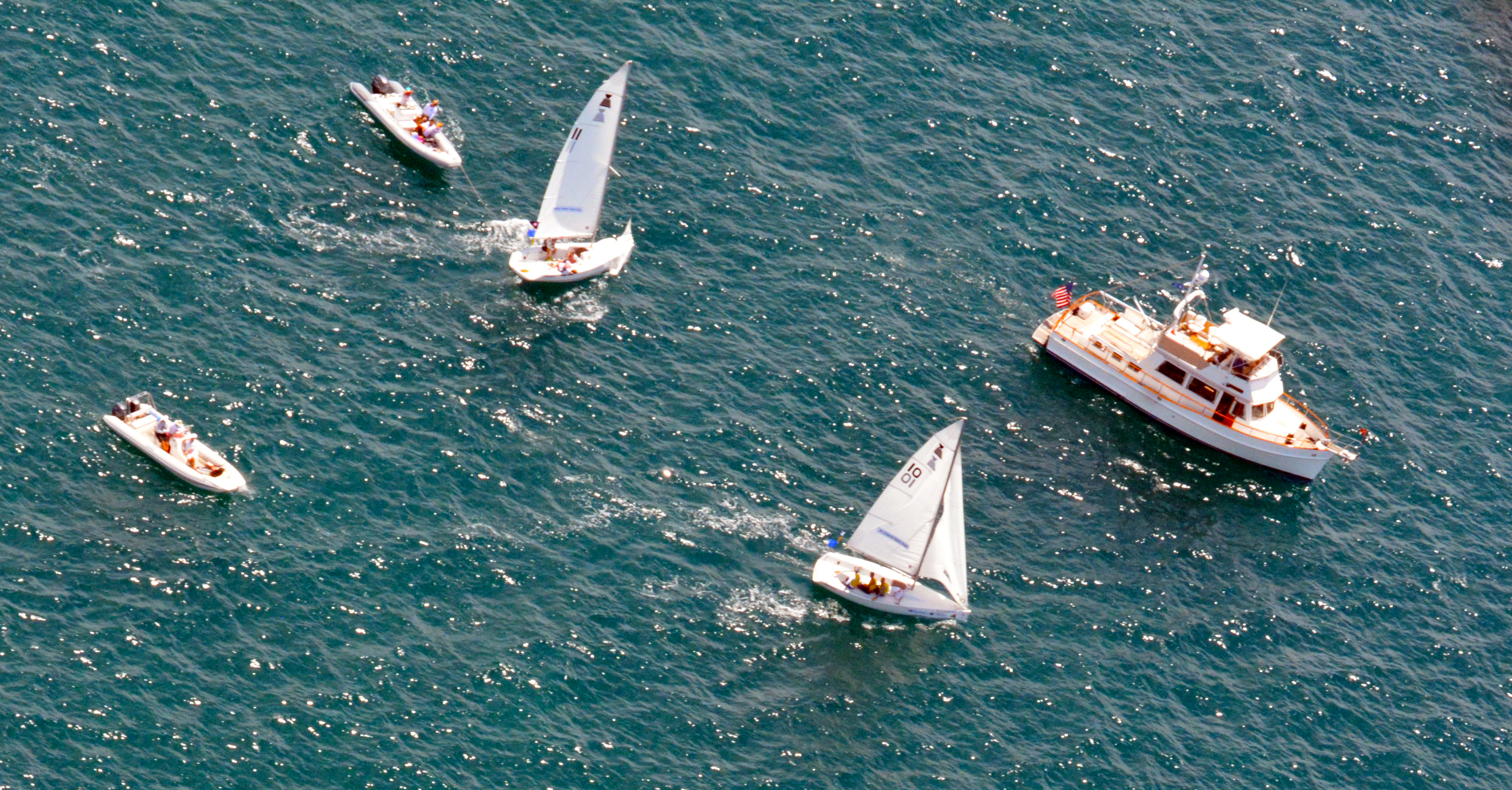
Governor's Cup racers

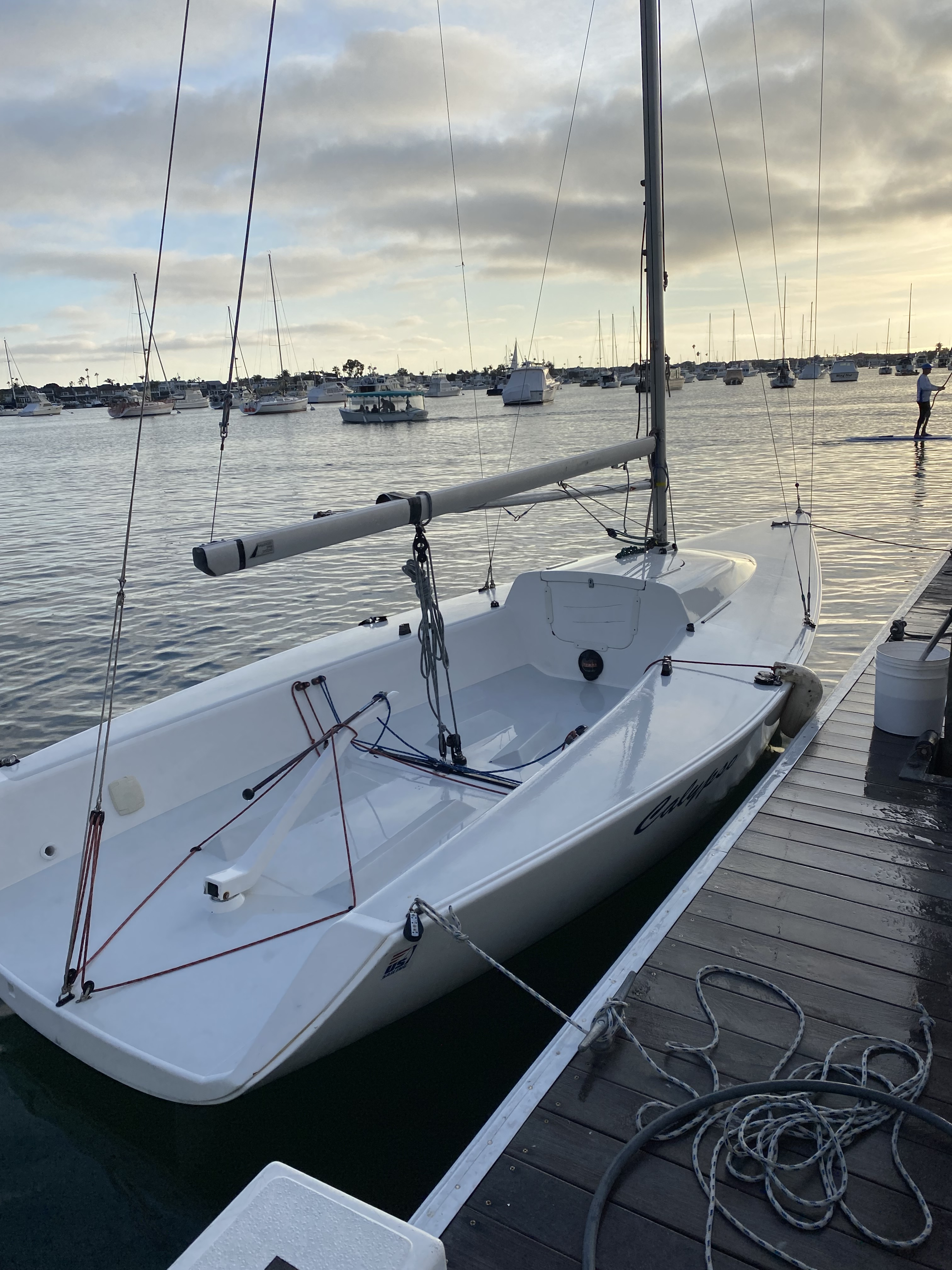
Governor's Cup 21 'Calypso', used for match race training at BYC.

The regatta was established in 1967 when the then California Governor Ronald Reagan donated the cup to Chet and Glee Purcell. Reagan declared the cup be "for the purpose of encouraging Youth Racing in the State of California and the recognition of the skill and high performance of those men and women under twenty years of age," which agreed with vision the Mr. and Mrs. Purcell shared.

=== Winning skippers ===
Year	Skipper	Yacht Club
1967	Argyle Campbell	BYC
1968	Argyle Campbell	BYC
1969	Andy Rose	BYC
1970	Andy Rose	BYC
1971	John Daigh	NHYC
1972	Curt Olsen	CYC
1973	Bill Menninger	LAYC
1974	Mark Rastello	BYC
1975	Steve Washburn	LBYC
1976	Steve Schock	NHYC
1977	Scott Mason	BCYC
1978	Brad Wheeler	BYC
1979	Brad Wheeler	BYC
1980	Jack Franco	BYC
1981	Gordon Clute	SFYC
1982	Mike Pinckney	BCYC
1983	Mike Pnickney	BCYC
1984	Chris Redman	ABYC
1985	Chris Redman	ABYC
1986	Bart Hackworth	SFYC
1987	Geoff Becker	CpBYC
1988	Jason Fain	RYC
1989	Mark Christensen	RNZYS
1990	Kelvin Harrap	RNZYS
1991	Giselle Camet	SDYC
1992	Anthony Merrington	RPAYC
1993	Tim Wadlow	SWYC
1994	Matt McQueen	StFYC
1995	Andy Estcourt	RNZYS
1996	Steve Kleha	NHYC
1997	Tom Hebbert	BBSC
1998	Brian Bissel	NHYC
1999	Colin Campbell	KHYC
2000	Colin Campbell	KHYC
2001	Simon Minoprio	RNZYS
2002	Paul Campbell-James	RYA
2003	Seve Jarvin	CYCA
2004	Murray Gordon	RPAYC
2005	Murray Gordon	RPAYC
2006	Steven Natvig	KHYC
2007	Michael Menninger	NHYC
2008	Michael Menninger	NHYC
2009	William Tiller	RNZYS
2010	William Tiller	RNZYS
2011	Nevin Snow	SDYC
2012	Timothy Coltman	RPNYC
2013	Sam Gilmour	RFBYC
2014	Sam Gilmour	RFBYC
2015	Harry Price	CYCA
2016	Nevin Snow	SDYC
2017	Christophe Killian	BYC
2018	Harry Price	CYCA
2019	Nick Egnot Johnson	RNZYS
2021	Jeffrey Petersen	BYC
2022	Jordan Stevenson	RNZYS

== Other events ==
The inaugural Wooden Boat Festival was held on June 7, 2014 at the Balboa Yacht Club. The show is similar to the Lake Tahoe Concours d'Elegance with vintage wooden power boats and sailboats.

== Maritime Sciences & Seamanship Foundation ==
The Balboa Yacht Club also funds the BYC Maritime Sciences & Seamanship Foundation

== See also ==
- List of International Council of Yacht Clubs members
