= Lake Tahoe Concours d'Elegance =

Wooden boat judging event, since 1972

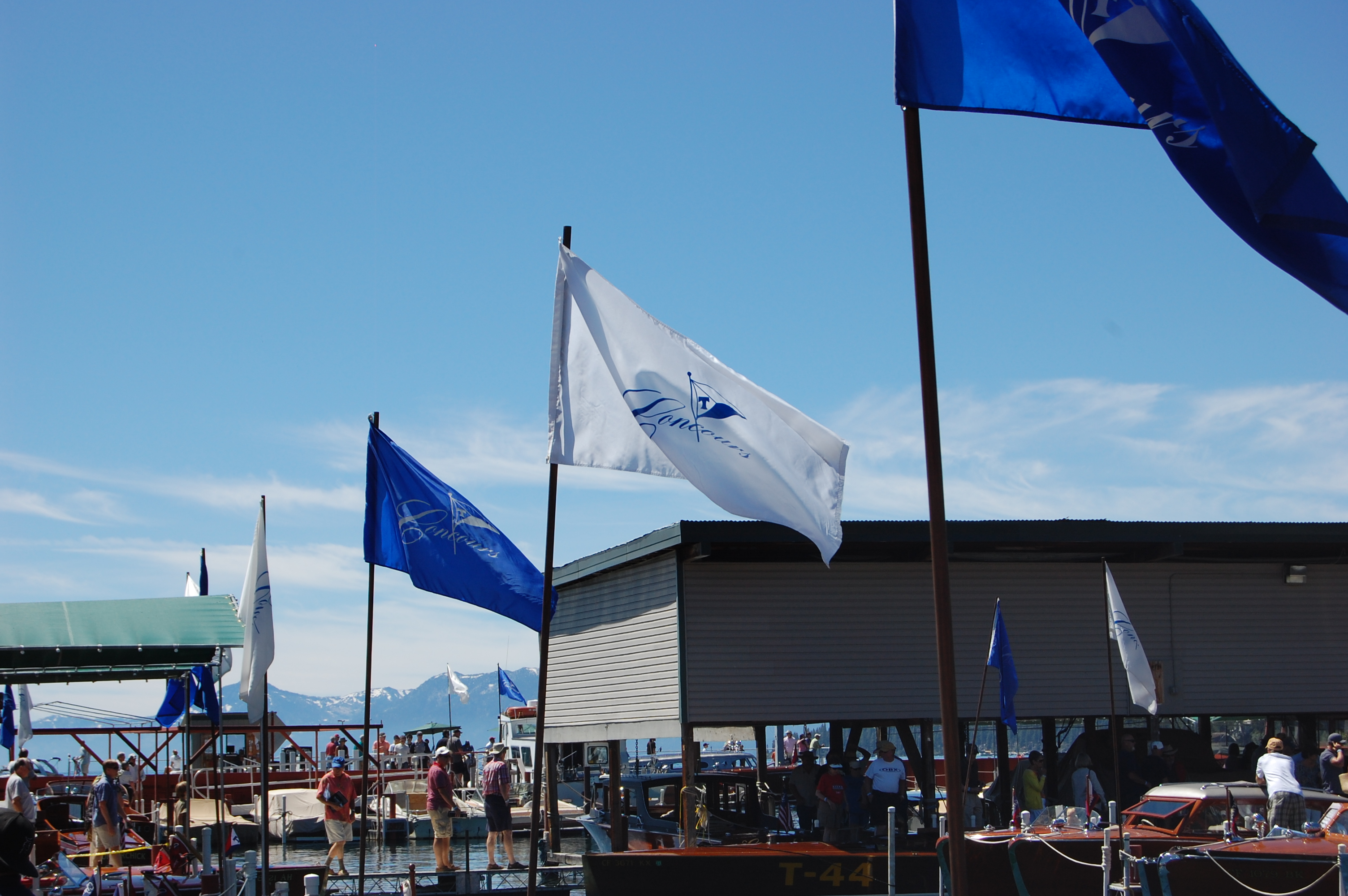
The logo of the Concours as seen on flags at the 2011 show.

The Lake Tahoe Concours d'Elegance is an event held at Lake Tahoe yearly, and serves as one of the most prestigious judging events for classic wooden boats. The event, held over a two- to three-day span in August of every year (with the years 2009 and 2010 being exceptions, held in June), started in 1972 by wooden boat enthusiasts and experts of Lake Tahoe to judge boats much like in a car concours. Now officially hosted by the Tahoe Yacht Club, since 1994, the show has become a renowned event in the wooden boat world. Each year the show raises money for charitable donation, with $32,000 being donated in 2010, with total donations from 1994 to present have totaled over $200,000.

== History ==
The Lake Tahoe Concourse d'Elegance was started at the Tahoe City Marina in 1972, by wooden boat enthusiasts and owners seeking to create a judging and display spectacle for their boats. In 1994, the Tahoe Yacht Club (founded 1925) began hosting the show, and moved the event to Sierra Boat Company's marina in Carnelian Bay. Each year a painting by artist Roy Dryer III is made and used as the official poster of that year's show.

== Events ==
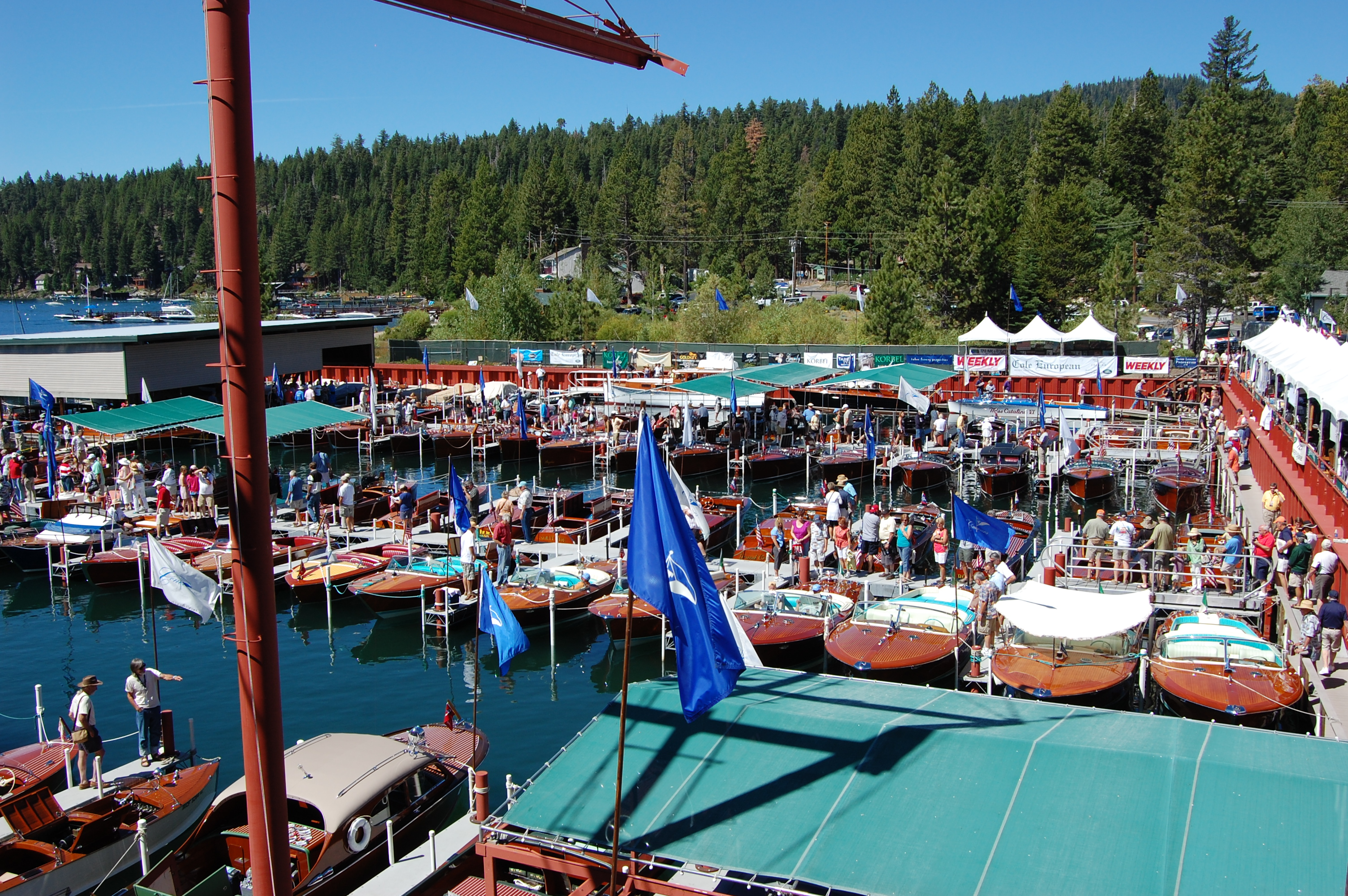
The show on judging day, as seen from atop the Sierra Boat building at the 2011 Concours.

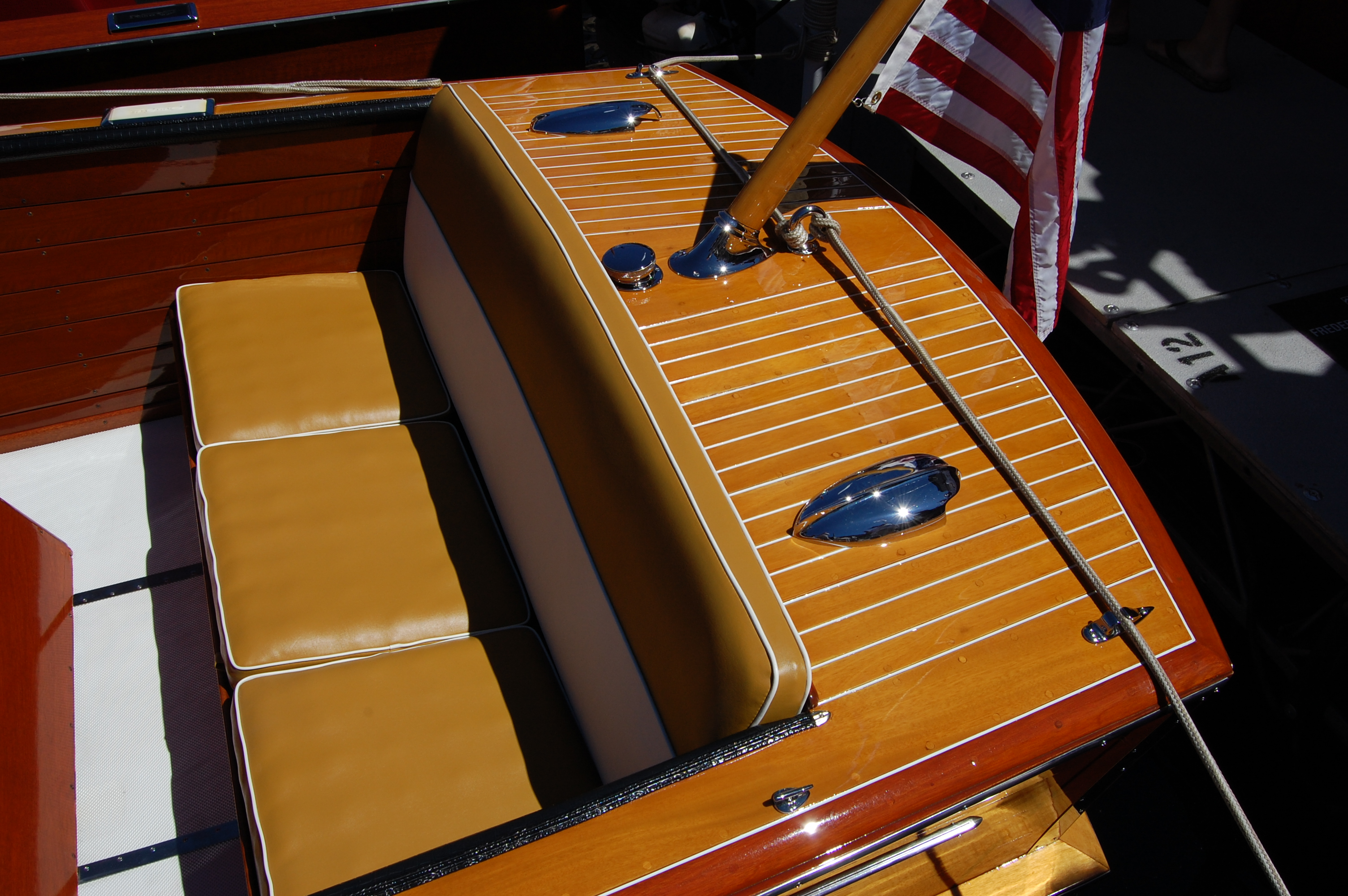
An example of a blonde deck of a Chris-Craft, called so because of the gold varnish.

The show is a centerpiece of the Wooden Boat Week at Lake Tahoe, which consists of the show itself, various barbecue events for yacht club members, and the Woodie-Over-The-Bottom race, which is a multi-step race over an annually changing course that consists of completing multiple tasks at predetermined speeds; the week is finished with a celebration called Mahogany Magic, which showcases a slideshow of all the events that transpired over that week.

The show originally started on a Thursday, closed to the public, where the boats' engines would be run as the first step in the judging process. The show officially began on Friday, to VIP visitors, the day the judging would take place (although it would extend into Saturday). The show has many classes, for each marque of boat, as well as perpetual awards; a Marque Class was selected each year, as the predominant show theme, where boats from the specific class, ranging from Chris-Crafts to Boats of the 1920s. One the Saturday of the show, after all judging ends, the boats make a celebratory exit from the Sierra Boat Marina, as they head to the awards ceremony, or wherever the owners wish to go afterwards.

== Judging ==
From the beginning, the show was intended to be a place for owners to both show off their boats, and for them to be judged. Over the show's years, the judging system has been refined, and first-place boats are considered world-class. The judging system consists of a 100-point judging rubric, in which every aspect from hardware, to finish, to wiring and upholstery are thoroughly examined. Points are taken off for things such as incorrect wiring (from original), incorrect varnish color, imperfections in the finish, incorrect upholstery color, and hardware that isn't correct for the boat. Boats, unlike cars, need not their original engine, but must have an engine that is correct for that boat model, that year; if it was an option that year for a Hemi, but the boat originally has a Chevrolet engine, so long as everything has been restored as the boat would be configured with the Hemi, it will not face a deduction. Because of the 100-point system, there may be multiple first-place boats for that class, or there may only be second or third-place boats. As the prestige of the show has grown, and restorations get better, it is said by many judges and experts that some first-place boats may be restored to a condition better than it would have had exiting the factory.

Judges are all highly knowledgeable in wooden boats, and each judging team for a class has a lead judge, who is a foremost expert in that class, for instance Rivas. The chief judge of the show is a foremost expert in almost all wooden boats in general, and he has the expertise to oversee the entire process, and is a source for lead judges, as lead judges are for the judges, to clarify on questions, and make a final decision. Once the boats are judged, the judges from each class go to a respective table within the yacht club, away from the crowds, and discuss each boat and consider deductions based on all the judges' notes, to give a final score. Because of this rigorous process over its 39-year history, the show's judges and judging system are renowned, and it is the 'Pebble Beach' of wooden boat shows.

== Classes ==
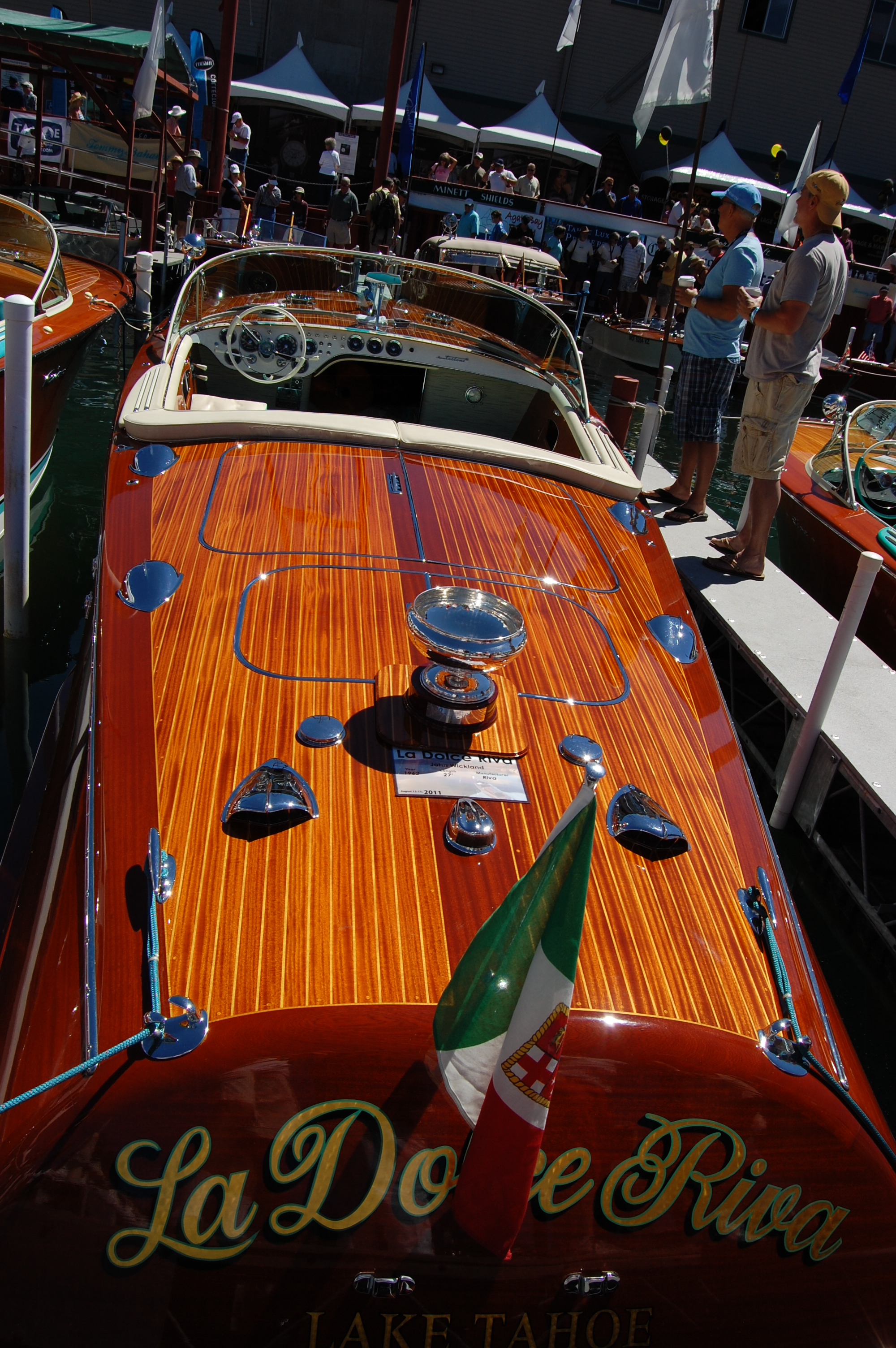
An example of a first-place winning Riva Tritone.

There are many classes in the show, to cover all types of wooden boats, from Hackercrafts to Stancrafts, and all other in between. This is a list of the classes from the 2011 Concours.

- Class 1- Lakers & Launches
- Class 2- Outboards & Canoes
- Class 3- Triple Cockpit Runabouts Over 23 ft.
- Class 4- Triple Cockpit Runabouts Under 23 ft.
- Class 4- Utility Models
- Class 5- Pre-War Runabouts (war being WWII)
- Class 6- Post-War Runabouts
- Class 7- Blonde Deck Runabouts
- Class 8- Riva & International Entries
- Class 9- Sedan Runabouts
- Class 10- Youth Entries
- Class 11- Sedan Runabouts (there is no #10 listed)
- Class 12- Racing Runabouts / Gentlemen's Racers
- Class 13- Open Class
- Class 14- Marque Class (2011, Gar Woods)
