= Newport Beach Wooden Boat Festival =

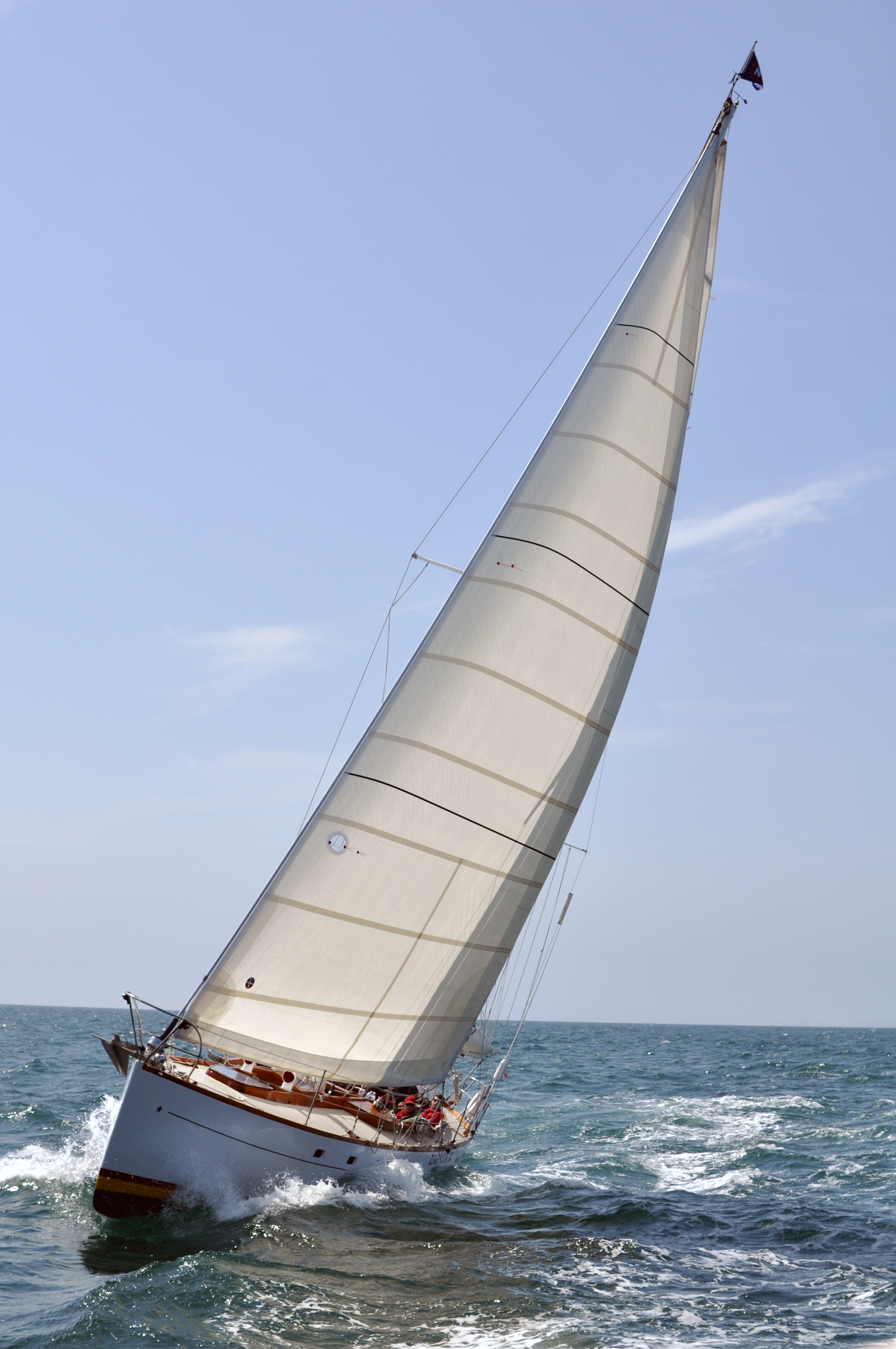
- Zapata II Winner in Class of the 2014 Newport Beach Wooden Boat Festival
- Location: Newport Beach, California, United States
- Organised by: Balboa Yacht Club
- Website: newportbeachwoodenboatfestival.com

The Newport Beach Wooden Boat Festival is an annual event held at the Balboa Yacht Club in Newport Beach, California. The festival celebrates wooden boats of all sizes including wooden canoes, kayaks, and dinghies, as well as yachts and tall ships.

The first Newport Beach Wooden Boat Festival was held June 6, 2014 and featured 47 boats on display.

The COVID-19 pandemic caused officials to scrap the 7th annual festival in 2020 & defer it to 2021.

2018 Newport Beach Wooden Boat Festival documentary by Don Ramey Logan

== Awards ==
Awards are given in the following categories:

- Best–in-class power: over 50 feet and under 50 feet
- Best–in-class sail: over 50 feet and under 50 feet
- Human-powered wooden vessels

== 2015 events ==
The 2015 Newport Beach Wooden Boat Festival was held on June 6, 2015, in conjunction with the 40th anniversary of the Newport Beach Harbor Patrol. The yacht America, for which the America's Cup is named, was on display at the event.

== 2014 Winners ==
Sail:

- Over 50 feet: Zapata II
- Under 50 feet: RHODES 33 "Madness"
