= Patrol Boat, River =

U.S. Navy, Vietnam War (1966–1975)

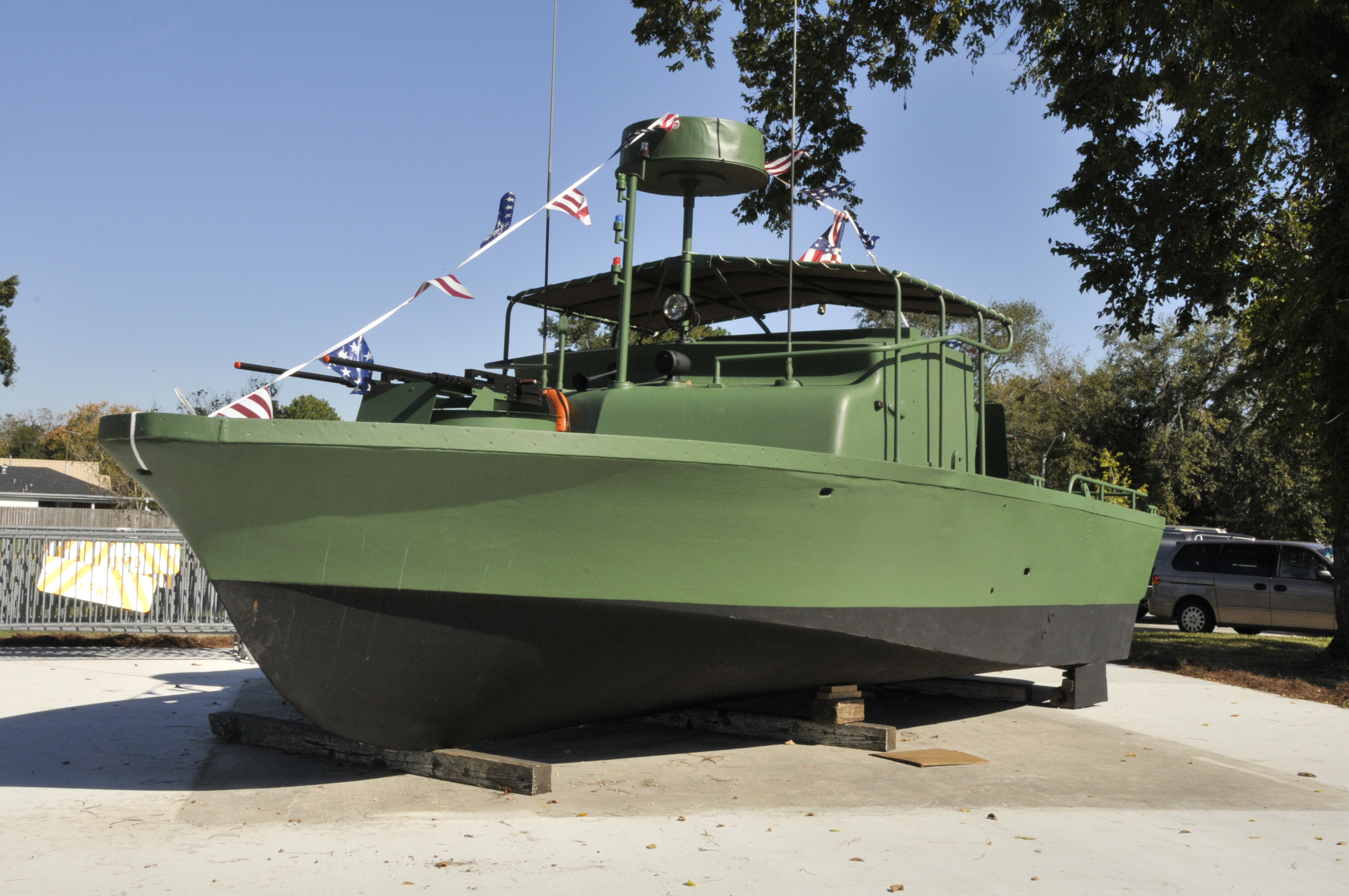
- Preserved PBR 6829 in Kenner, Louisiana.

Class overview
- Name: PBR (Patrol Boat, River)
- Builders: Uniflite, River City Machine Works
- Operators: See Operators
- Preceded by: PTF boat
- Succeeded by: Special Operations Craft – Riverine
- Cost: $75,000 ($593,000 in 2018 dollars)
- Built: Dec. 1965 – Sep. 1980, 1990
- In service: 1966–2019
- Completed: 161 (Mark I) and 418 (Mark II) 6 (Mark II Replacements - RCMW)
- Active: 13
- Lost: at least 19
- Preserved: 27 non-operational 9 operational

General characteristics
- Type: Riverine patrol boat
- Displacement: 8.9 ton for Mk II
- Length: 31 ft (9.4 m) (Mk I); 32 ft (9.8 m) (Mk II)
- Beam: 10.5 ft (3.2 m) (MK I); 11.5 ft (3.5 m) (MK II)
- Draft: 2 ft (0.61 m)
- Propulsion: 2 × 180 hp (130 kW) Detroit Diesel 6V53N engines each driving a Jacuzzi Brothers 14YJ water pump-jet with thrust buckets for reverse thrust.
- Speed: 30 knots (56 km/h; 35 mph) (unloaded); 25 knots (46 km/h; 29 mph) (loaded)
- Range: 150 nautical miles
- Complement: 4
- Crew: Coxswain, Engineman, Gunner, Seaman, Patrol Officer, MP, ARVN Interpreter
- Sensors & processing systems: Raytheon 1900 radar unit
- Armament: 1 × twin .50 caliber (12.7 mm) M2HB Browning machine guns or 1 × single (20 mm) Mk12 Colt 20 mm cannon (forward, in a rotating tub); 1 × single (81 mm) M252 mortar or 1 × single M2HB (rear); 1 or 2 × 7.62 mm M60 machine gun(s) (side-mounted); 1 × 40 mm Mk 18 grenade launcher (pintle mount)
- Armor: Ceramic armor shields fitted to guns, bridge. Also crew-applied ballistic blankets to protect the coxswain in the control cockpit.

Patrol Boat, River / PBR or Pibber, is the United States Navy designation for a small rigid-hulled patrol boat used in the Vietnam War from March 1966 until 1975. They were deployed in a force that grew to 250 boats, the most common craft in the River Patrol Force, Task Force 116. They were used to stop and search river traffic in areas such as the Mekong Delta, the Rung Sat Special Zone, the Saigon River and in I Corps in the area assigned to Task Force Clearwater, in an attempt to disrupt weapons shipments. In this role, they frequently became involved in firefights with enemy soldiers on boats and on the shore, were used to insert and extract Navy SEAL teams, and were employed by the United States Army's 458th Transportation Company, known as the 'Sea Tigers.'

The PBR was a versatile boat with a fiberglass hull and water jet drive which enabled it to operate in shallow, weed-choked rivers. It drew only 2 feet (0.61 m) of water fully loaded. The drives could be pivoted to reverse direction, turn the boat in its own length, or come to a stop from full speed in a few boat lengths.

Development began with a report released in January 1965 from the Weapons Planning Group of the Naval Air Weapons Station China Lake testing installation, calling for the development of a more effective riverine warfare force. Existing hardware used by the Republic of Vietnam Navy was based on French patrol craft left over from the French Indochina War, and deemed unsuitable to counteract heavy Vietcong presence in the Mekong Delta.

The PBR continued to see use after the Vietnam War by several navies. The U.S. retired it in the 90s, after which it was replaced by the Special Operations Craft – Riverine (SOC-R).

== Design ==
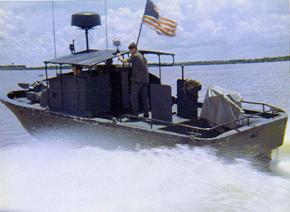
PBR Mark II

To meet the demand for new riverine craft, the Bureau of Naval Weapons issued a set of requirements for a shallow-water hull made of aluminum or fiberglass, a propulsion system suited for a delta environment, capable of high speed and high maneuverability. Due to the urgent need of equipment by U.S. forces, only existing hull designs adapted to military use would be accepted.

The first PBR prototype was designed by Willis Slane and Jack Hargrave of Hatteras Yachts Co., located at High Point, North Carolina. A week after a meeting with U.S. Navy officials at Washington D.C., Slane and Hargrave had the prototype ready, based on an existing sporting hull. 28 foot long and featuring a water-jet drive from Indiana Gear Works, powered by a set of supercharged Daytona diesel engines, it was capable of 30.5 knots.

A second prototype was produced by Arthur Nordtvedt, the design was based on a pleasure boat constructed by Uniflite (United Boat Builders), a boatyard in Bellingham, Washington, on the northern end of Puget Sound near the Canadian border.

During trials, the incomplete nature of the Hatteras prototype worked against it. On November 29, 1965, the Navy awarded a contract to the company for construction of 140 PBRs to Uniflite on the stipulation that 120 hulls had to be delivered by April 1, 1966.

The PBR was manufactured in two versions, both with a hull constructed of fiberglass. The Mark I was 31 feet (9.4 m) length and 10-foot, 7-inch beam. The Mark II version was 32 feet (9.8 m) long, and had a 1-foot (0.30 m) wider beam than the Mark I. The first Mark I craft came off the assembly line on December 21, 1965. The first 11 PBRs were delivered on March 21, 1966, at the U.S. logistics base in Cần Thơ, with approximately 300 delivered over the next few years to the U.S. and South Vietnamese military.

Nordtvedt was flown to South Vietnam in September 1966 to address deficiencies with the Mark I. Suggestions from boat crews, and field observations, were incorporated into the Mark II design. It had improved drives to reduce fouling, aluminum gunwales added to the hull to resist wear, and a flatter hull bottom better suited to shallow water.

According to Nordtvedt the redesign “improved its ability to carry a heavier load with no loss in performance.” This allowed Mark II's to utilize heavier weapons. Production began in 1967, continuing until 1980. In 1990, 6 Mark IIs were built by River City Machine Works Inc., to replace existing PBRs.

=== Crew ===
The PBR was usually manned by a four-man crew. Typically, a first class petty officer served as boat captain, with a gunner's mate, an engineman, and a seaman on board. Each crewman was cross-trained in each other's jobs in the event one became unable to carry out his duties.

Generally, PBRs operated in pairs under the command of a patrol officer who rode on one of the boats.

An MP or Interpreter from an ARVN unit often rode with PBRs when on routine patrols, to help inspect local Sampan boats and other civilian river traffic or enforce curfews.

=== Power ===
The boats were powered by dual 220 horsepower (160 kilowatts) Detroit Diesel 6V53N engines with Jacuzzi Brothers 14YJ water-jet drives. The boats reached top speeds of 25–31 knots (46–57 km/h; 29–36 mph) depending on the load.

A field modification to remove armor from PBR 105 supposedly allowed the vessel to reach a top speed of 35 knots (65 km/h; 40 mph).

=== Armament ===
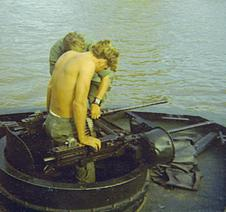
PBR Mark II forward .50 caliber twin M2 machine guns

The boats had a comparatively heavy firepower for their size. Typical armament configuration included twin M2HB .50 caliber (12.7 mm) machine guns forward in a rotating, shielded tub, a single rear M2HB, one or two M60 7.62 mm light machine guns mounted on the port and starboard sides, and a Mk 18 grenade launcher. There was also a full complement of M16 rifles, shotguns, M1911 pistols and hand grenades. Some had a "piggyback" arrangement, a .50 cal machine gun on top of an 81mm mortar; others had a bow-mounted Mk16 Mod 4 Colt 20 mm automatic cannon, derived from the AN/M3 version of the Hispano-Suiza HS.404 and also found on the LCMs and PBRs.

The boats are not well protected, aside from some ceramic armor shielding for the machine gun pit, and some quarter-inch thick steel armor plate for the coxswain's flat.

They were designed to rely on rapid acceleration, maneuverability, and speed to get out of dangerous situations.

== Operational career ==
From 1966 to 1970, PBRs were operated by the Navy as the principal component of Task Force 116, established on 18 December 1965. The navy began training crews on the PBR at facilities in Coronado and Mare Island, California. Mare Island was home to the U.S. Navy's Repair Facilities, Mothballing Operations, Submarine Operations, and Riverine Training Operations for both Patrol Craft Fast (PCF—more commonly known as Swift Boats), PBRs, and the River Assault Boats of the Mobile Riverine Force. By August 1968 TF 116 operated as 5 separate River Divisions, RD 51–55, located in Cần Thơ, Sa Đéc (later Vĩnh Long), Mỹ Tho, Nha Be, and Danang.

The first recorded loss of a PBR occurred in early 1967, in an accident during launch from the USS Jennings County.

The force participated in Operation Game Warden and Operation Jackstay, but only in a patrol role. It was intended for units to retreat if engaged. The start of the Tet Offensive resulted in a need to press PBRs into heavier than expected fighting, participating in the Battle of Huế and the Battle of Khe Sanh. PBRs acquitted themselves well, and began being used as active fire support.

Since the Navy was busy patrolling the rivers, the U.S. Army had to secure the waters around its military ports. So, it converted the 458th Transportation Company (LARC) into a PBR company in early 1968 under the 18th Military Police Brigade. With the company headquarters at Cat Lai, the company assigned pairs of PBRs to each of the Army ports. PBR's in Army use were nicknamed "J-Boats" to distinguish them.

In early 1969, President Richard M. Nixon formally adopted the policy of "Vietnamization". The naval part, called ACTOV ("Accelerated Turnover to the Vietnamese"), involved the phased transfer to Vietnam of the U.S. river and coastal fleet, as well as operational command over various operations. On 10 October 1969, 80 PBRs were transferred to the RVNN at the Ba Son Shipyard, the PBRs were divided into four River Patrol Groups (RPGs) as part of Task Force 212.

In December 1970, Task Force 116 was deactivated, with most PBR boats transferred to the Republic of Vietnam Navy. In September 1971, The 458th was deactivated.

Due to significant cuts of U.S. financial support in 1974, the RVNN was forced to lay up many of its PBRs.

After the fall of South Vietnam in 1975, most naval assets, including PBR boats were captured by North Vietnamese forces and placed into service with the Vietnam People's Navy. The boats were kept with their original American armaments, as the VPN did not begin rearming captured craft with domestic weapons until the 2010s. Vietnam retired its PBRs beginning in 1988, with the last boats in active military service in 1992.

The U.S. Navy continued to retain some PBR Mark IIs to provide for security, escort duty, and training. During the 1980s, PBRs were stationed at the Naval Base Panama Canal Zone, providing escort for larger surface combatants. During Operation Earnest Will PBR units operated from the USS LaSalle in the Persian Gulf, to escort US merchant shipping until the end of the Tanker War.

The PBR saw its last military action in 1989 during Operation Just Cause supporting U.S. Navy SEALs tasked with securing control of the Canal Locks and Paitillia airfield. On December 20, 1989, two PBRs provided fire support against Panamanian forces during a boarding action of a German-registered Merchant ship.

In the early 1990s, what remained of the U.S. Navy's PBR force was solely in the Naval Reserve and was moved further inland towards Sacramento, California, the state capital, which is also intertwined with rivers. From Sacramento, PBRs could still transit directly to and through San Francisco Bay and into the Pacific Ocean, if need be.

PBRs were placed into the U.S. Naval Reserve up until 1995 at California Deactivated units were being sold as military surplus in 1991, after being stripped down of hardware. By 1994, only 27 PBR Mark IIs remained in the U.S. reserves. The last PBRs were retired for good by March 31, 1996, when Mare Island base closed due to a BRAC action.

The training areas for the PBRs and Swift Boats still exist today within the Napa Sonoma Marsh state wildlife area. Sloughs such as Dutchman Slough, China Slough, Napa Slough, Devil's Slough, Suisun marshland and the Napa River all run through the former training area.

== Operators ==
- Khmer Republic – Khmer National Navy 64 units.
- Panama – SENAN
- Philippines – Formerly used by Philippine Navy
- South Vietnam – Republic of Vietnam Navy 293 units in 1970.
- Vietnam: Vietnam People's Navy 275 units in 1975, Captured from the former South Vietnam Navy. Retired in 1992.
- Thailand – Royal Thai Navy 45 units overall, 20 commissioned in 1967, 10 in 1972, and 15 in 1973. 13 in active service as of 2019.
- United States – Formerly used by US Navy, retired in 1995.

== Preservation ==
=== United States ===
As of 2021 there were known to be between 36 original PBRs held between private collectors, museums, and historical societies, with 9 vessels in working condition and others in various stages of restoration.

PBR 7331 was donated to the Operation Black Sheep non-profit organization in 2017 by John McClurg. It was restored to working order in 2018 and offers public tours in Muskegon, Michigan.

Known PBRs as of 2021
Hull	Model	Custodian	Status	Location
664	MK. I	Naval Amphibious Base Little Creek	Display	Norfolk VA
6615	MK. I	Lynden Pioneer Museum	Storage	Lynden WA
6665	MK. I	Bellingham Intl Maritime Museum	Display	Bellingham WA
66108	MK. I	Patriots Point Naval & Maritime Museum	Display	Mt. Pleasant SC
66161	MK. I	USS Silversides Museum	Operational	Muskegon MI
671	MK. II	Private Collection	Refurbishing	Bridgeport CT
6827	MK. II	Private Collection	Operational	Lake Sawyer WA
6829	MK. II	Veterans Memorial Century of Sentries Park	Display	Kenner LA
6881	MK. II	Private Collection	Refurbishing	Martinsburg WV
6883	MK. II	Private Collection	Refurbishing	Lynchburg TX
6884	MK. II	Unknown (Formerly Hall Truck Sales)	Unknown	Unknown
6887	MK. II	Veterans Memorial Museum	Display	Huntsville AL
6889	MK. II	Mare Island Museum	Display	Vallejo CA
6889	Re-hull	Museum of the American GI	Display	College Station TX
6894	MK. II	Naval History and Heritage Command	Storage	Washington DC
6927	MK. II	Private Collection	Operational	Richmond OH
J7844	MK. II	Gamewardens NW Chapter	Refurbishing	Sumner WA
J7844	Re-hull	Private Collection	Operational	St. Augustine FL
7021	MK. II	Russell Military Museum	Display	Zion IL
7116	MK. II	Private Collection	Refurbishing	Martinsburgh WV
7118	MK. II	Private Collection	Storage	Greenport NY
7129	MK. II	Private Collection	Storage	Bridgeport CT
721	MK. II	Private Collection	Operational	Shiloh NC
722	MK. II	Gamewardens NW Chapter	Unknown	New Zealand WA
723	MK. II	Private Collection	Storage	Oroville CA
7210	MK. II	Private Collection	Refurbishing	Davis CA
210	MK. II	Wyoming Museum of Military	Operational	Dubois WY
7215	MK. II	Gamewardens WC Chapter	Display	Coronado CA
7329	MK. II	Private Collection	Refurbishing	Lynchburg TX
7331	MK. II	Alabama Naval Museum	Display	Mobile AL
7331	Re-hull	Operation Blacksheep	Operational	Muskegon MI
7332	MK. II	Private Collection	Unknown	Portland OR
7332	Re-hull	Private Collection	Operational	San Anselmo CA
7334	MK. II	Military Machines of American Freedom	Display	Quincy FL
7335	MK. II	Nat’l Vietnam War Museum	Display	Orlando FL
7336	MK. II	Gamewardens WC Chapter	Operational	Murrietta CA
7336	Re-hull	Private Collection	Refurbishing	Chama NM
7337	MK. II	Private Collection	Refurbishing	Gettysburg PA
Unknown	MK. II	US Army Transportation Museum	Storage	Fort Eustis, VA
Unknown	MK. II	Private Collection	Storage	Jacksonville, FL
Unknown	MK. II	National Navy Seal Museum & Memorial	Display	Fort Pierce FL
Unknown	MK. II	National Navy Seal Museum & Memorial	Display	Fort Pierce FL
	Replica	Jeremy Clarkson	Storage	Cook Islands

== Medals ==
James "Willie" Williams was a United States Navy sailor commanding PBR 105. During a patrol operation on 31 October 1966, an engagement between the two PBRs (105 and one other) and two Viet Cong (VC) sampans escalated into a three-hour running battle involving more than 50 enemy vessels, numerous VC ground troops, and U.S. Navy attack helicopter support. For his role in this battle, Williams received the Medal of Honor. According to the citation, "the patrol accounted for the destruction or loss of 65 enemy boats and inflicted numerous casualties on the enemy personnel." Williams is considered the most heavily decorated enlisted sailor in U.S. Navy history. The U.S. Navy posthumously named a guided missile destroyer, USS James E. Williams, after him.

On 6 March 1967, United States Navy Seaman David George Ouellet was the forward machine gunner on PBR 124. After observing a grenade hurtled in his boats direction, Seaman Ouellet left the protection of his position and ran to the rear of his boat warning his shipmates to take cover. He then pushed the boat's captain down to safety and placed himself between the grenade and his shipmates. His actions saved the other men, but Ouellet was mortally wounded when the grenade detonated. For his actions that day, he was posthumously awarded the Medal of Honor.

Patrick Osborne Ford was a United States Navy sailor serving on a PBR patrol boat who was killed in South Vietnam after he saved the lives of two of his shipmates. The U.S. Navy posthumously awarded him the Navy Cross and later named a frigate, USS Ford (FFG-54), after him.

== In popular culture ==
The 1979 film Apocalypse Now takes place on a fictional United States Navy PBR, using the radio call-sign PBR Street Gang.

A PBR is seen used by the Vietnamese Navy in Rambo: First Blood Part II.

The PBR appears in the 1994 film Street Fighter. Used by soldiers analogous to UN peacekeepers.

Gunboat (1990) is a PBR simulation video game developed and released by Accolade for MS-DOS.

The PBR is a usable vehicle in Battlefield: Vietnam (2004) and Battlefield Bad Company 2: Vietnam (2010), as well as Operation Flashpoint: Cold War Crisis (2001), and Far Cry 3 (2012)

Appears in Call of Duty Black Ops (2010) during the mission Crash Site. The player boards a PBR and makes their way to a crashed Soviet plane.

The patrol boat appears in Grand Theft Auto V (2013) being added in the Cayo Perico Heist Update from November 2020. The boat is featured as a heist approach.

An unarmed PBR Mk. II replica called "Boat Machine" was used in the 2019 "Seamen" special; Episode 1, Season 4, of the television show The Grand Tour by Jeremy Clarkson. Due to a mistaken claim that there were no surviving PBRs, the replica was built completely from scratch in New Zealand. The total cost of building Clarkson's PBR was £100,000. The replica's fate is uncertain, with it being apparently stuck in the Cook Islands as of 2021.

== See also ==
- Patrol Craft Fast: An all-aluminum, 50-foot-long (15 m), riverine boat commonly referred to as the Swift Boat by the U.S. Navy's Brown Water Navy during the Vietnam War.
- Assault Support Patrol Boat
