= Cantieri di Pisa =

Italian company that produces yachts

- Headquarters: Pisa, Italy
- Products: Custom pleasure yachts.
- Website: www.cantieridipisa.com

Cantieri di Pisa (Pisa Shipyards) is an Italian company that produces yachts. Its history began in 1945 Pisa.

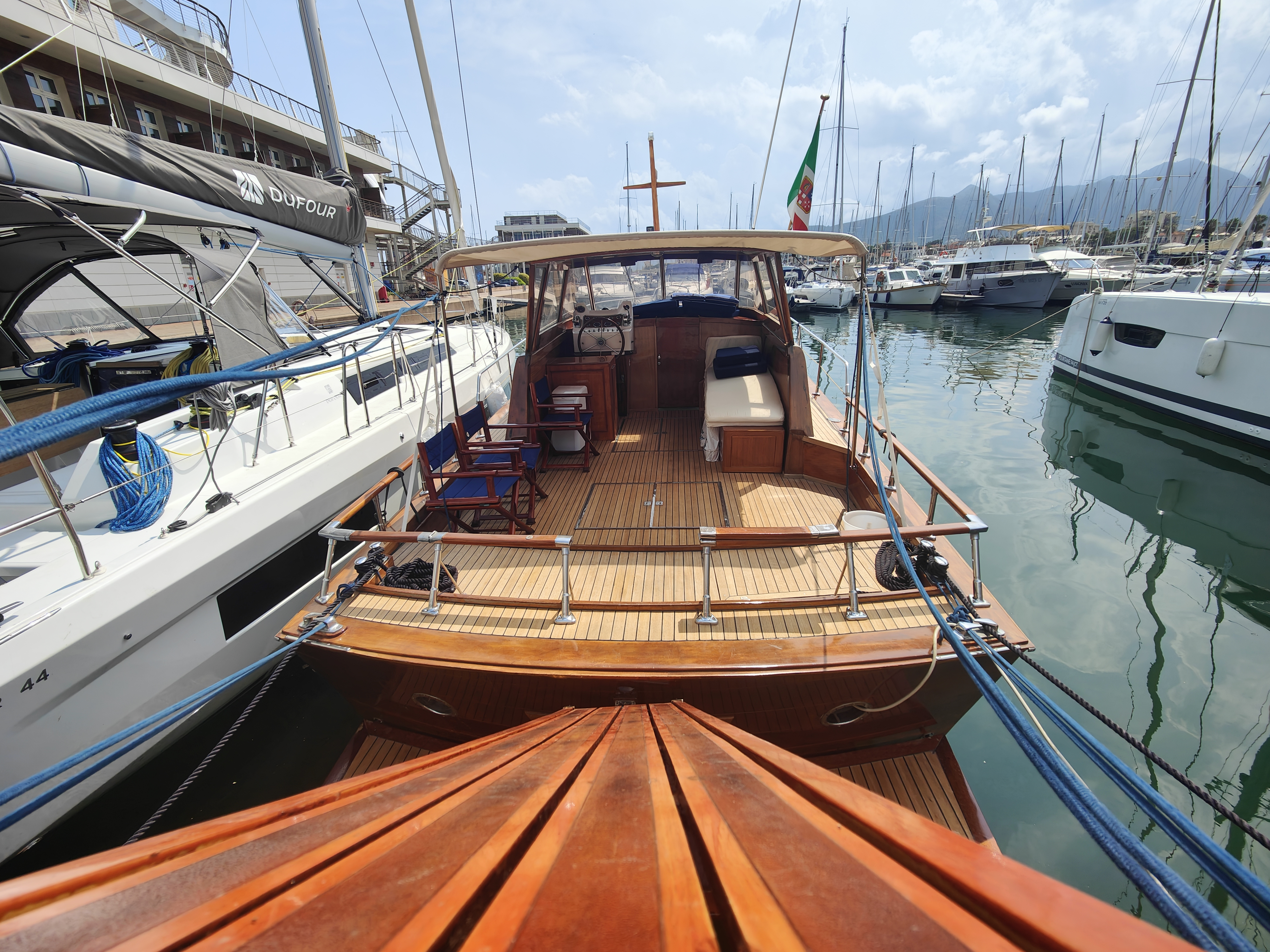
Super Polaris 1968, length 13,20mt. (43 feet 3,7 inch)/weight 18 tons/Motor GM Detroit Diesel 6V53K/436CV/max speed 25 kN/6 beds/3 W.C./capacity 760 LT.(200,771 gallons USA); (167,177 UK gallons) (additional tank 380 LT.; 100,4 gallons USA; 83,6 UK gallons).

The company became famous during the 1960s and 1970s when it began developing a particular line of yachts with names inspired by celestial constellations: Pegasus, Saturno, Jupiter, Polaris and Kitalpha. An additional model, the Akhir, quickly become the company's iconic vessel and helped make the Cantieri di Pisa name famous all over the world. In 2015 was acquired by Mondomarine.

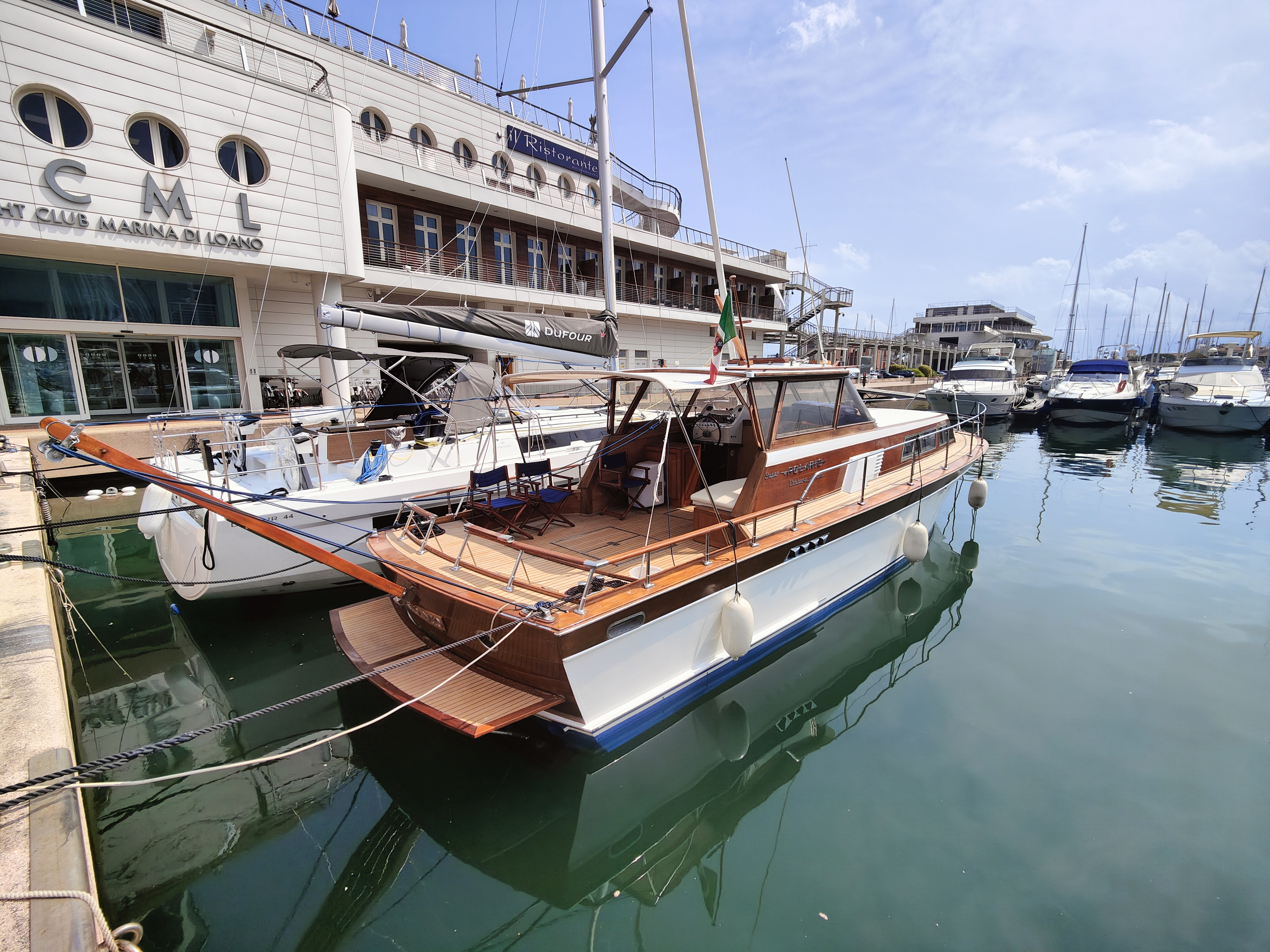
A beauty from the 60's at Marina di Loano, Super Polaris of 1968
