= Z1 Boats =

Z1 Boat is a brand of luxury yacht tender manufactured in the United States. Most notably, the 23 foot sportsboat, with a V-hull design made of fiberglass or Carbon / Kevlar laminate schedule, with an inboard motor, foot controls, and side steering console. The speedboats are manufactured by Z1 Boats, Inc.

== Purposes ==
It is used for sport fishing, water skiing, as a runabout, as a tender on luxury yachts and as a high performance sport boat.

== Manufacturing ==
Z1 boats were originally manufactured in Florida. The boats are equipped with very powerful Mercury Marine engines, and Bravo series sterndrive.

- All modern boats under twenty feet manufactured for sale in the United States are required by law to have positive flotation so that a completely swamped boat will still float.

== Current models ==
The current production model is the twenty-three foot, Luxury yacht tender, winner of the 2003 Miami International Boat Show sexiest boat award.

== See also ==
- Ski boat
- Boating
