= Clyde Boats =

American boatbuilder

- Company type: Private Limited Company
- Industry: Boatbuilder
- Founded: 1928
- Founder: Clyde Rummney
- Headquarters: Detroit, United States of America
- Area served: Great Lakes
- Products: Motor boats

Clyde Boats was a small, privately owned, custom boat company located in Detroit, Michigan. For nearly fifty years it produced custom mahogany motorboats for clients in the Great Lakes area.

Clyde Boats were available in three sizes; 12', 14', and 16'. Each boat began as a wooden "tub" constructed of moulded plywood and built by fishermen in Nova Scotia.
