= Carter Safari 28 =

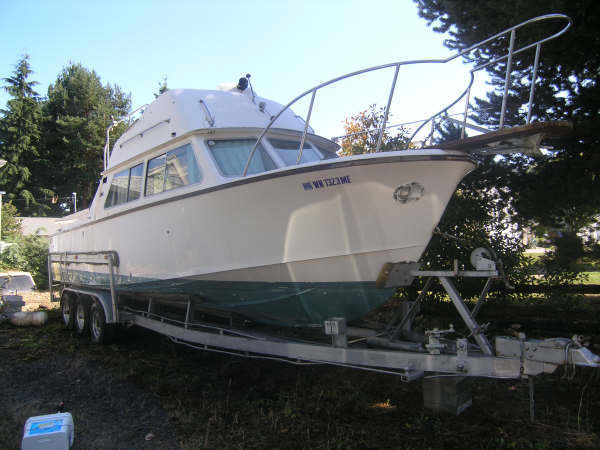
- Carter Safari 28

General
- Make: Carter
- Model: Safari
- Size: 28
- Builder: John Carter
- Built In: Costa Mesa, CA

Specs
- Available Power: 307CI. Volvo 225 B (SBC)(standard)x2; 351CI Volvo 240 A (SBF)x2; Volvo Diesel x2
- Drive: Volvo Penta 280 (x2)
- Fuel capacity: 150 Gallons
- Fresh Water Capacity: 2 x 30 Gallon Tanks
- Holding Tank Capacity: 35 Gallons
- Hull Buildup: Fibreglass.: 12 handlaid lays at Keel, - 8 handlaid lays balance of hull, - Stringers fully glassed and bonded to hull
- Sleeping Capacity: 4 to 8
- Forward Freeboard: 46"
- Aft Freeboard: 30"
- Forward Draft: 19"
- Aft Draft: 16.5" (26.5" with drives)
- Beam: 7' 11"
- Gunwale length: 29' 8"
- Displacement: 6700# dry

The Carter Safari 28 is a boat built by Carter Marine Inc in the 1970s. The Company was created by John Carter, who is an ex-boat builder from Costa Mesa, CA. They are identified by a black plaque above the center window in the cabin.

== About the boats ==
All the boats are 28' hull length. From there was the option of a bow sprit, as well as a swimgrid, which added to the total length. The boats are all equipped with a Flying Bridge Helm station, and some are also equipped with a secondary helm inside the cabin. In the cabin there is a head that also doubles as a shower stall. Across from the head is a large storage closet that has one shelf, and a hanger for clothes. In front of the closet there is a long counter. On this counter was a sink. Some boats also had a propane stove, others had a helm station mounted to the forward of the counter and had no stove. Across from the counter was a small table and bench seats, they also folded down like most RVs into a bed. Ahead of that is the V berth with enough room to sleep two.

The ID plaque only applied to early issue models. When the Coast Guard started requiring embossed hull numbers the ID was embossed on the stern transom.

The fuel tank of early model Safari 28 was made of fiberglass,(Coast Guard Requirements changed this sometime in the 1970s to require a metal tank) which can degrade with modern gasoline fuel blends.

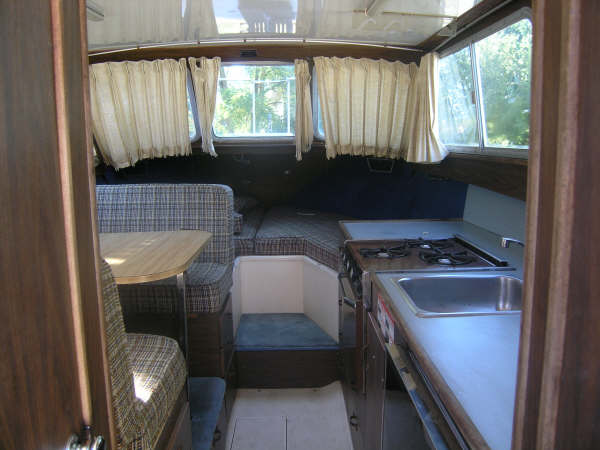
Inside the cabin, with stove, and no helm

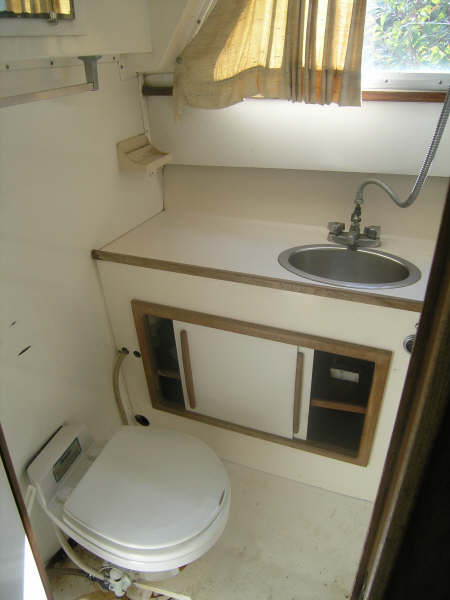
The head, inside the cabin

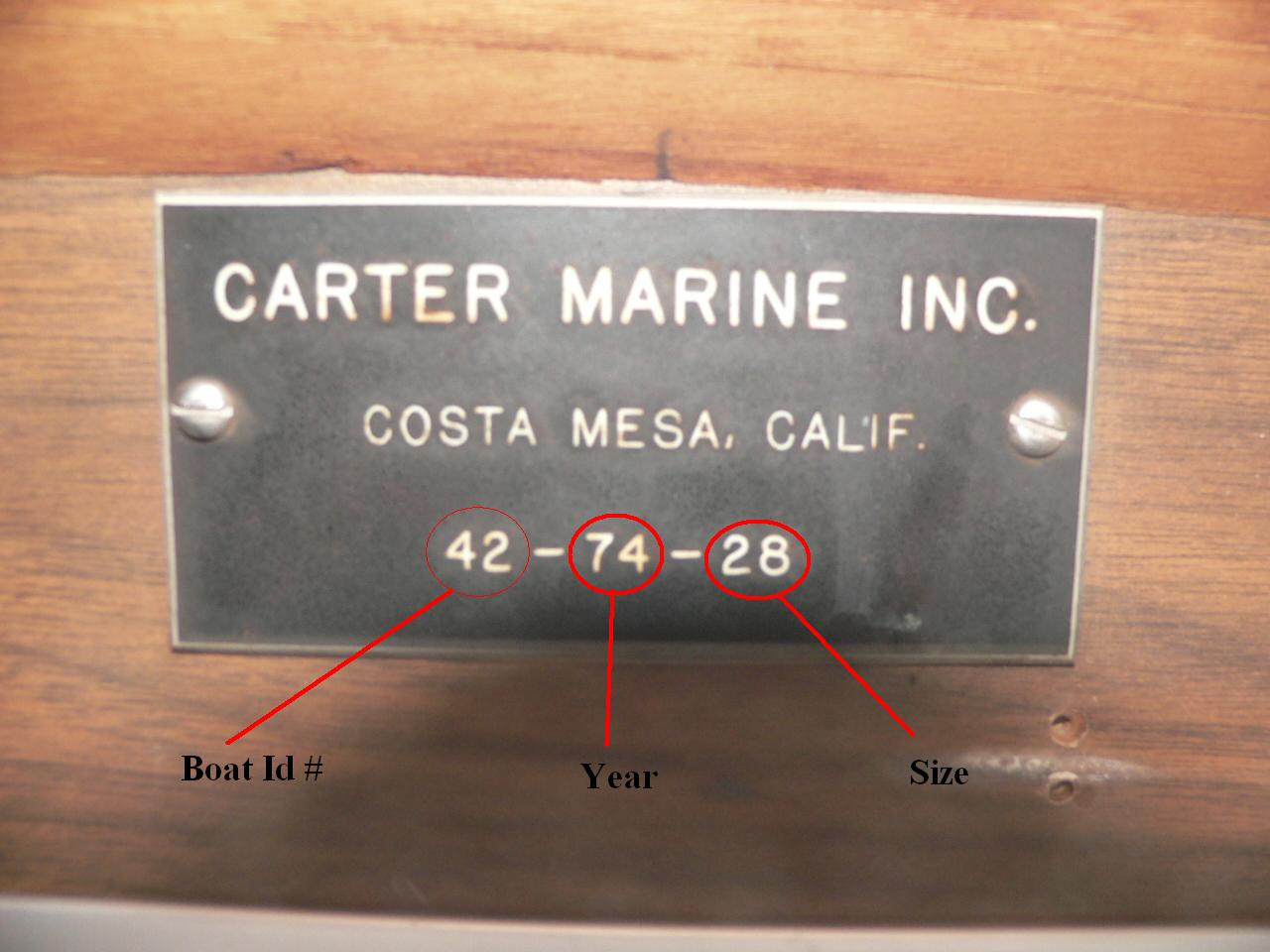
Id plaque

== Popular culture ==
A Carter Safari appears in the TV Show Cougar Town in the trailers as well as some episodes.
