= American Skier Inboard Boats =

American Skier boats (not to be confused with Correct Crafts American Skier) was a tournament boat company founded by Ken Elkind. Elkind of North Miami Beach, Florida, United States, in 1975. Mr. Elkind, after retiring from the offshore racing circuits, became interested in the water skiing business. In the early 1980s American Skier became one of the first tournament boat companies to be approved for competition by the American Water Ski Association. The first 18' Skiers came out as 1976 models from a shop in Opa Locka Florida. In the early 1990s WESMAR took over ownership. They built the 1991-95 models in Ocoee, Florida, moved it to Cape Coral, Florida, and moved it again, this time to Giddings, Texas. Ron Tanis purchased the company in 1995 and moved the molds from Giddings to Winnsboro, Louisiana. Ron Tanis sold the company to the politician Jay Blossman, and the former professional water skier Ben Favret. Tanis had met Favret in high school. Ben and Jay renamed the company to Elan Boats. The last "true" American Skiers were built in early 2002.

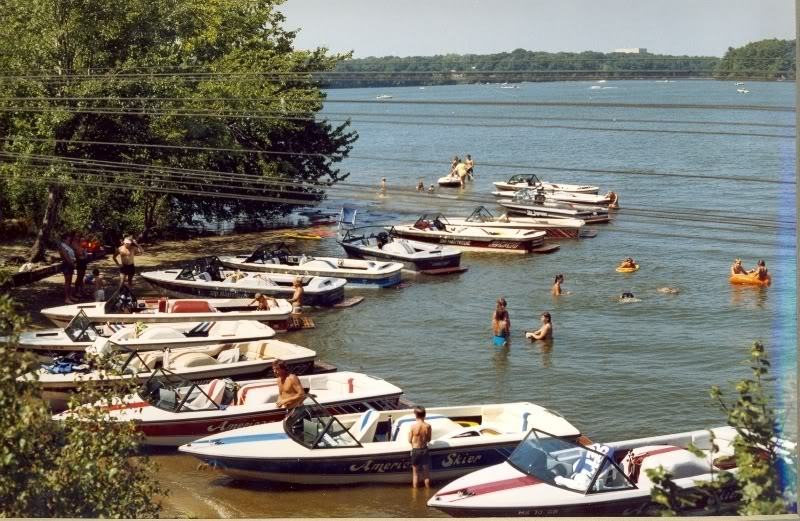
Three Seasons Ski club Natick, Massachusetts in 1987

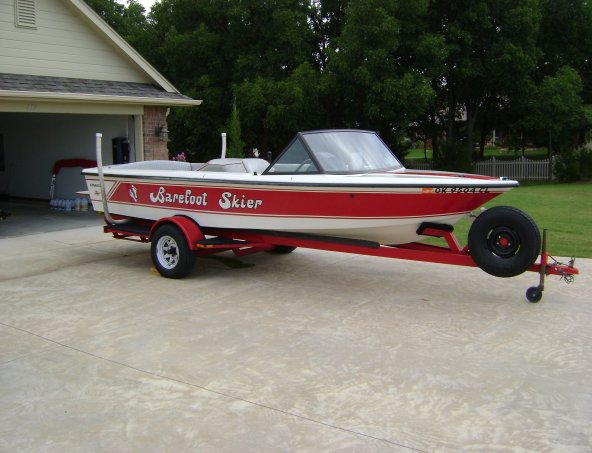
Barefoot Skier.

== Models and timeline ==
=== 1976 to 1984 ===
American Skier built its first boat in 1976. The boat was an 18 footer known as "American Skier", also called 18 Skier, 18 Tournament Skier, or 18 Comp Skier. American Skier also produced the 18 Luxury which was considered higher end than the original.

=== 1982 to 1984 ===
In 1982 the Volante was produced. A closed bow and the hull deck design, as well as other changes made this boat stand out. Later, the barefoot skier was produced, whose main difference was the choice of engine.

=== 1985 ===
In 1985, American Skier began selling the Advance, a boat that combined elements from both the 18’ and the Volante. The 19’ Advance was the most popular boat sold by American Skier, and was continued until 2001 in a slightly modified version by the name of the Lazer. That year, the factory was moved from Opa Locka to Ocoee.

=== 1988 to 2003 ===
An open bow version of the Volante was produced. Most of the boat was unchanged, except for the modifications to make the boat open bow. The 24’ Eagle was also produced in this time period, and it came with new features such as a swim platform.

=== 1989 to early 1990s ===
The Legend was released in 1989. It was meant to replace the Advance, and incorporated elements from the Volante.

=== 1993 to 1994 ===
American Skier made the TBX, which shared many characteristics with the earlier Advance. Modifications were made in the late 1990s.

=== Late 1990s to early 2000s ===
In 1995, the company was purchased by Ron and Susan Tanis, who began to rework the designs of American Skier boats, adding ideas to the boat designs. The first boats to receive the changes were the Open Bow Volante, the Lazer, and the TBX.

In 1999, the American Skier plant moved into a larger facility in Kentwood, Louisiana, where boat development continued. Modifications and additions were made to the boats, and the Lazer was renamed the Laz Air.

In 2001 the company assets were sold to Ben Favret and Jay Blossman who changed the name to Elan Boats.
