= Uniflite =

United Boat Builders
- Trade name: Uniflite
- Industry: Shipbuilding
- Founded: October 1957; 68 years ago in Bellingham, Washington
- Founder: Art Nordtvedt
- Defunct: 1989
- Parent: Chris-Craft Boats (from 1984)

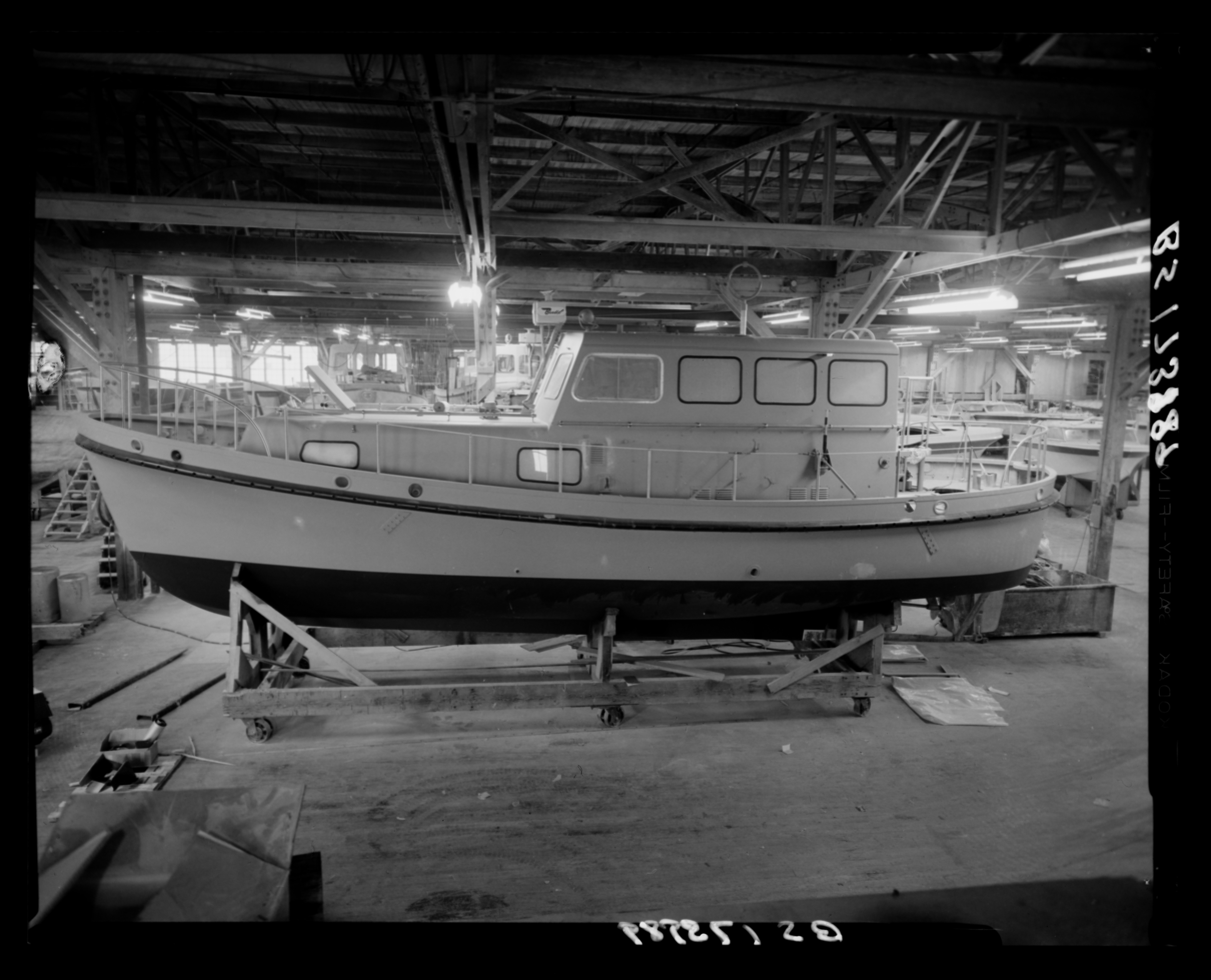
United Boat Builders Arctic survey boat

Uniflite (United Boat Builders) was founded in Bellingham, Washington, by Art Nordtvedt in October 1957. Although the company is best remembered as a maker of recreational powerboats, its initial products were small fiberglass runabouts. The company also supplied river patrol craft to the US Navy Patrol Boat, River between 1965 and 1972 for use in the Vietnam War.

Uniflite was acquired by Chris-Craft Boats in 1984 who continued to build the boats under their brand until they ceased production in 1989.

After the company's demise, Art's son, Gary Nordtvedt, went on to found Norstar Boats.

== History ==
Uniflite (United Boat Builders) was started in Bellingham, WA, by Art "Papa" Nordtvedt in October 1957.

The first Uniflite boat an all fiberglass 17' outboard. Uniflite soon added a 14', an 18' and a 20' outboard and inboard/outboard boats, followed by a 25' express cruiser followed by a 31' and a 34' boat. Uniflite was the only boat builder exclusively using fire-retardant resins in the production of pleasure boats.

In January 1959, the plant and office moved into the old plywood plant in Fairhaven, Washington (in Bellingham). This became Uniflite's permanent home.

In 1962, Uniflite became a public company trading on the New York Stock Exchange, thus becoming eligible for Navy contracts.

In 1965, the Navy awarded Uniflite with a contract to build Patrol Boat, Rivers (PBRs). The PBRs were powered by twin Detroit 6V53 diesel engines with water jets and they cruised between 25 and 31 knots. There were approximately 718 PBRs built, at least 418 of which were built by Uniflite. At the height of production two PBRs were rolling off the assembly line along with one 36' landing craft each day. In addition to the Navy contracts, in the 1960s and early 1970s Uniflite had numerous other military contract building 14' and 50' boats: patrol craft, landing craft, and personnel boats. Uniflite also built commercial fishing boats, and sailboats besides the more widely recognized pleasure boats.

In 1977, Uniflite acquired boat molds from Pacemaker Boat Co. Pacemaker Boat company was founded in 1949 by Charles Platt (C.P.) Leek in New Jersey from his company C.P. Leek & Sons, Inc. who also later established Egg Harbor boat company. It was at this time that Uniflite started a second Uniflite plant in Swansboro, North Carolina.

In 1980, a fire almost totally destroyed the Uniflite plant in Bellingham. However, since they had molds in Swansboro, NC, they were able to continue production of their boats.

In 1984, Uniflite was acquired by Chris Craft for $10 per share. Chris Craft built many of the identical boats under the Chris Craft label until they stopped production in 1989.
