= Lazzara =

Lazzara is a surname originating from the Aramaic given name Lazar, which is a form of the Hebrew name Elazar. This name is a conjunction of "El", meaning God and of "Azar", which means help. This translates roughly as "may God help him" or "God has helped". Historically, particular habits may have caused nicknames to become surnames; in Italy, Lazzara may have arisen from one who was a beggar, or biblically from leper.

Lazzara may refer to:

- Adam Lazzara (born 1981), lead singer for Taking Back Sunday
- Bernadette Peters (originally Lazzara; born 1948), actress and singer
- Marco Lazzara (born 1962), 20th-century Italian countertenor
- Michael Lazzara, American politician
- Richard A. Lazzara (born 1945), judge for the United States District Court for the Middle District of Florida

== Sources ==
- Coles Smith, Eldson (1986). American surnames. Genealogical Publishing Com. ISBN 0-8063-1150-9.
- Wheeler, William Adolphus (2010). An Explanatory and Pronouncing Dictionary of the Noted Names of Fiction; Including Also Familiar Pseudonyms, Surnames Bestowed on Eminent Men, and Analogous Popular Appellations Often Referred to in Literature and Conversation. Read Books. ISBN 978-1-4455-5237-8.
