= KaiserWerft =

German boat building company

- Type: Private
- Industry: Boat building, yacht manufacturing
- Defunct: 2008 (original company)
- Headquarters: Germany
- Area served: Worldwide
- Products: Yachts, custom-built boats
- Parent: Re-established as Swiss holding company (post-2008)

KaiserWerft is a German boat building company specializing in yachts.

The Kaiser shipyard was considered one of the most exclusive in its branch. At the boat industry exhibition in 2006, the Kaiserwerft exhibited the Catwalk, the largest yacht ever shown in a hall. A special feature of the company was that according to its own statements, apart from large supplier parts such as the engines, it manufactured all parts itself in Germany or sourced them from Germany. On November 24, 2008, Kaiserwerft filed for insolvency with the Regensburg District Court. The lawyer Joachim Exner, a law firm from Regensburg specializing in insolvencies, was entrusted with the insolvency administration. An investor bought up from the insolvency estate not only tools and materials, but also molds and rights to the name at the KaiserWerft auction. A new KaiserWerft was also created, which currently operates as a Swiss holding company. This group includes sites in Rostock, Istanbul and Dubai.
