= Wacanda Marine =

From its inception in the late 1940s through about 1984, Wacanda Marine, Inc. was owned and operated by Forrest Collins, Colville, Washington. From 1984 to 1988, the company was owned by the Yakima Indian Nation, Wapato, Washington, although Mr. Collins managed the production

According to the company owner, the name of the company, "Wacanda", was in recognition that early on, about half the boats were being sold in Washington State, half in Canada.

During the course of its operations, Wacanda Marine Inc. produced a series of 12' to 21' fiberglass boats. The boats were typically operated on the lakes and white water rivers of the Pacific Northwest and western Canada. Mr. Collins has indicated that he does not know exactly how many boats the company produced over the years, although it was several thousand.

== Early innovation ==
The earliest boats were 12' and 13' ("Fisherman") models and 15' ("Vandal") models. Wacanda boats were all built with fiberglass ribs, stringers and floors. The only wood (other than some interior parts) used in the boats were wooden motor mount beds. The boats were known to be extremely well built, with generous fiberglass lamination schedules. In the early to mid-1950s the boats had styling features fairly common to the era, such as dramatically dropped shear lines and tail-fins. Automotive safety glass windshields purchased from the Ford Motor Company were fitted to some of the earliest 16 foot V-hull models. By the late 1950s, Wacanda boats had evolved distinctive styling and performance features including on the v-hulls a flared and concave (hollow) bow profile and 'squared off' bow. These features resulted in a roomier interior, as well as a very dry boat.

Also, in the mid-1950s, Mr. Collins designed the V-hulls with an inset transom that carried forward through the end of production. This inset transom hull design was somewhat innovative at the time, although it was later seen on boats from other manufacturers.

== Later production ==
In the 1960s through 1980s, the v-hull boats carried a shear line that gradually dropped down toward the stern, with the bulwarks rising above the beltline to maintain gunwale height. Some of the boats had a distinctive molded-in accent line on the sides.

In an early 1960s product brochure, the Evinrude Outboards featured a 16' Wacanda "Husky" v-hull model blasting through Snake River rapids (on the Idaho/Washington/Oregon border).

In the early 1970s, Wacanda began producing an 18' Tri-hull that was available in three configurations: cabin ("Dolphin"), open bow ("Viking") and a forward control version ("Barracuda"). Mr. Collins has indicated that the 18' Tri-hull was loosely based on a 17' Thompson Marine Co. tri-hull model.

During the last few years of production, the company introduced a 20' tri-hull, loosely based on the 18' model. All the 20' tri-hulls were sterndrive or jet powered.

== Propulsion ==
Wacanda was one of the earliest boat manufacturers to utilize inboard jet drives. In the late 1950s, the company began installing "Starfire" jet drive units, built in Spokane, Washington.

Inboard jet drives remained a power choice for Wacanda through the end of production in 1988, frequently with drives built by Berkley Pump Co. (California) or Eliminator Jet (Idaho). However, Wacanda boats were most commonly powered with outboard motors or inboard-outboard (stern drive) power plants.
