= StanCraft Boat Company =

- Company type: Private
- Industry: Boat manufacturing
- Founded: 1933
- Founder: W.H. "Billy" Young; Stanley Young
- Headquarters: Hayden, Idaho
- Key people: Robb Bloem (Owner, president); Amy Bloem (Owner)
- Number of employees: 65 (2015)
- Website: stancraftboats.com

StanCraft Boat Company is an American boat design and manufacturing company based in Hayden, Idaho.

== History ==
StanCraft was founded in 1933 by W.H. "Billy" Young and his son Stanley Young, when they handcrafted their first mahogany wood speedster in Lakeside, Montana, on the shore of Flathead Lake. Over the next 35 years, they constructed over 800 wooden boats, with Stanley Young as head designer and builder.

In 1937, when StanCraft built its first factory near Somers, Montana, it was the only boat-building factory in Montana. Stanley and his brother Donald Young operated the factory until the beginning of World War II, and resumed operations after the war. During the war, Stanley operated a plant on the West Coast, building boats for the US Coast Guard. In 1948, StanCraft's sales offices and headquarters were moved from Somers to nearby Polson, Montana. On March 9, 1966, a fire burned down the StanCraft manufacturing plant in Somers, destroying 11 boats that were in storage.

Stanley Young and his wife Delores had three children, including Syd Young, who took over the business in 1970. As fiberglass boats grew in popularity, the company began building fiberglass boats in addition to wooden boats. Syd Young moved the company to Coeur d'Alene, Idaho, in 1981. The company's main business at the time was restoring wooden boats, building only a few new boats per year. The 1981 film On Golden Pond, which features vintage wooden boats, was credited in part with sparking renewed interest in the vessels. In 1997, Syd Young cut back on operations and sold much of the company's assets to Hagadone Marine Group. Robb and Amy Bloem (Billy Young's great-granddaughter) took over what remained of StanCraft in 2003, rebuilding the custom manufacturing operations while expanding the company's storage and restoration services and adding three brands of fiberglass boats to its offerings.
