= Commander, Naval Air Forces =

Type Command for U.S. Naval air forces operating primarily in the Pacific

Commander, Naval Air Forces and Commander, Naval Air Force Pacific
- CNAF (COMNAVAIRFOR) and CNAP (COMNAVAIRFORPAC)
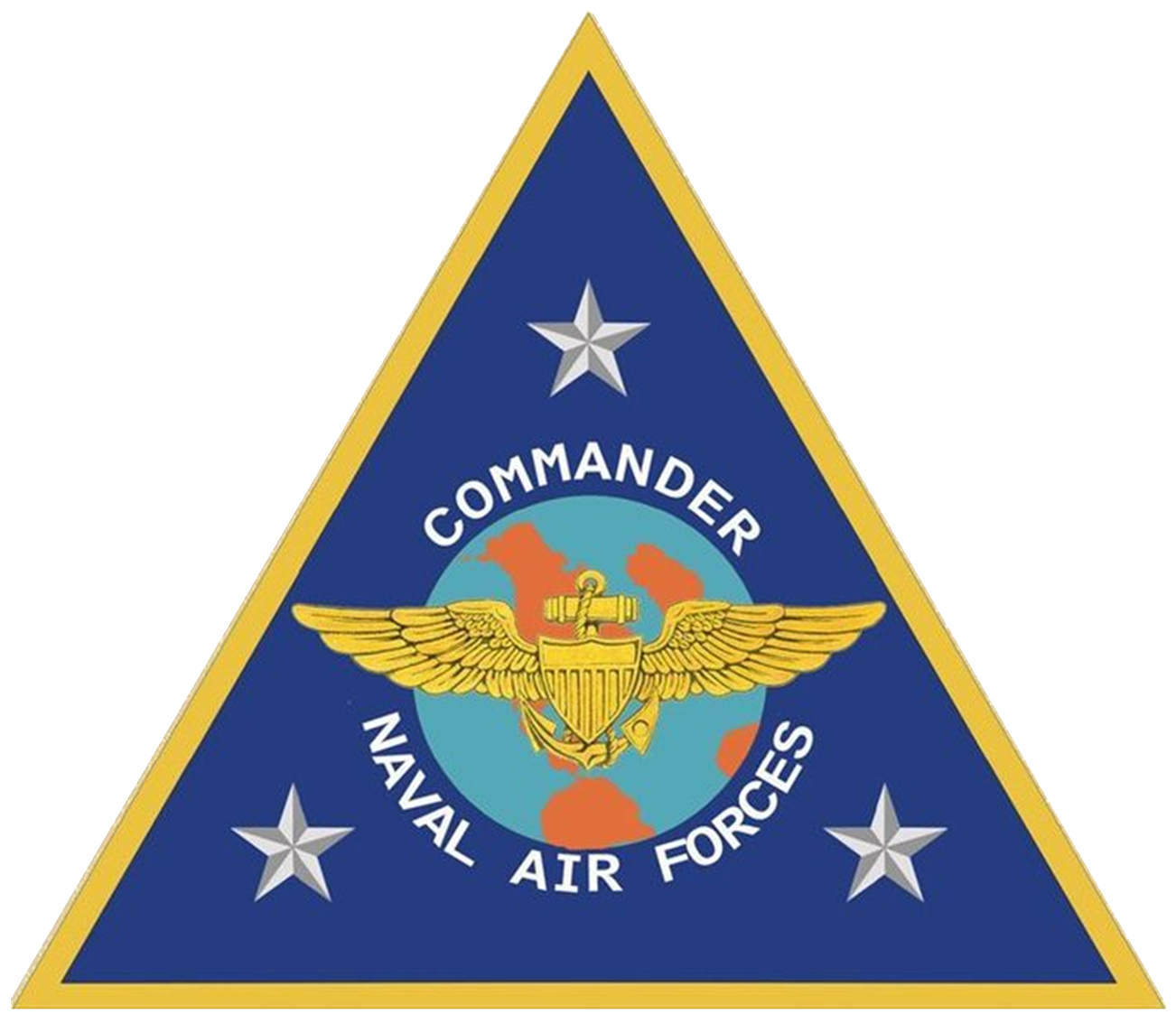
- Insignia of the Commander, Naval Air Forces and Commander, Naval Air Force Pacific

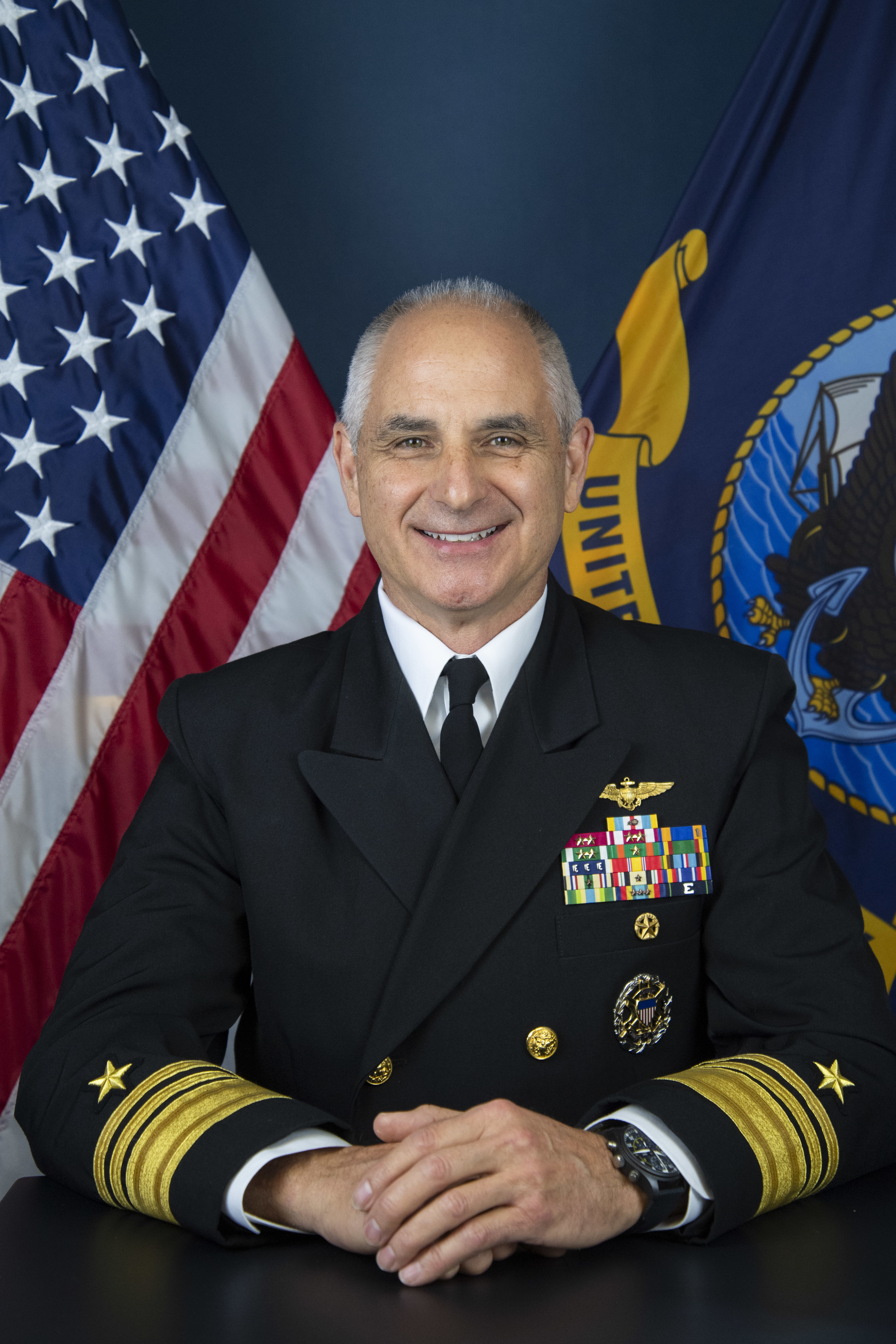
- Incumbent; Vice Admiral Douglas C. Verissimo since 2 February 2026
- Department of the Navy
- Type: Type Commander
- Reports to: Chief of Naval Operations; Commander, U.S. Pacific Fleet
- Seat: Naval Air Station North Island
- Formation: CNAF – October 2001; CNAP – July 29, 1942
- First holder: Admiral John B. Nathman
- Unofficial names: "Air Boss"
- Deputy: Deputy Commander, Naval Air Forces
- Website: https://www.airpac.navy.mil/

The Commander, Naval Air Forces (a.k.a. COMNAVAIRFOR, and CNAF; and dual-hatted as Commander, Naval Air Force, Pacific, and COMNAVAIRPAC) is the aviation type commander (TYCOM) for all United States Navy naval aviation units. Type commanders are in administrative control (ADCON), and in some cases operational control (OPCON) of certain types of assets (ships, submarines, aircraft, and Fleet Marines) assigned to the Pacific and Atlantic Fleets. AIRFOR is responsible for the materiel readiness, administration, training, and inspection of units/squadrons under their command, and for providing operationally ready air squadrons and aircraft carriers to the fleet.

COMNAVAIRFOR is a three-star headquarters, based at NAS North Island in Coronado, California. The current commander is VADM Douglas C. Verissimo. The staff is made up of about 515 officer, enlisted, civilian and contractor personnel. The position is colloquially known throughout the Navy as "the Air Boss", mimicking the nickname given to the officer who commands the air department on an aircraft carrier.

== Mission ==
"Man, train, and equip deployable, combat-ready naval Aviation forces that win in combat."

== Naval Aviation Enterprise ==
Commander, Naval Air Forces (CNAF), also known as the "Air Boss," is the senior Navy leader of the Naval Aviation Enterprise (NAE) and is responsible for all Naval Aviation programs, personnel and assets. CNAF is a dual-hatted position where the incumbent concurrently functions as Commander Naval Air Force Pacific Fleet (COMNAVAIRPAC). CNAF is supported by Commander, Naval Air Force, U.S. Atlantic Fleet (COMNAVAIRLANT); Commander, Naval Air Force Reserve (COMNAVAIRES); the Chief of Naval Air Training (CNATRA); and the Commander, Naval Aviation Warfighting Development Center (NAWDC).

The NAE encompasses all of Naval Aviation and has three, three-star leaders. In addition to the Commander Naval Air Forces, these leaders are the U.S. Marine Corps Deputy Commandant for Aviation and the commander of Naval Air Systems Command (COMNAVAIRSYSCOM). Within the NAE there are about 3,800 sea-based and shore-based aircraft that perform strike/fighter, electronic attack, airborne early warning, maritime patrol and reconnaissance, anti-surface warfare, anti-submarine/sub-surface warfare, strategic communications relay, search and rescue (SAR), helicopter mine countermeasures, training, and logistical support missions. These assets include 11 aircraft carriers and approximately 100,000 active and reserve military personnel, as well as Department of the Navy civilians and contractors.

== History ==
In October 1919, Air Detachment, Pacific Fleet came into existence, making naval aviation formally part of the U.S. Pacific Fleet. The original organization was divided into Landplane, Shipplane and Seaplane divisions. Within a brief period, the three divisions evolved into Fighting, Spotting and Seaplane Patrol Squadrons, respectively. The purpose of air detachments was: "attack on enemy aircraft, spotting gunfire for surface craft torpedo attack by torpedo planes, demolition, toxic gas and incendiary bomb attack, smoke and gas screen laying, mine and countermining; flare dropping; scouting reconnaissance, patrol and convoy duty; photography, mapping, detection of enemy coastal defenses and mail passenger service."

In June 1922 as part of a reorganization combining the Atlantic and Pacific Fleets into the U.S. Fleet, the detachment was renamed Aircraft Squadrons, Battle Fleet. In 1933, another reorganization established two principal commands: Commander Aircraft Battle Force and Commander Tender-based Aircraft.

Commander, Air Pacific was established during World War II as the requirements of supporting air combat units widely deployed in the Pacific Ocean area increased.

Finding much inefficiency in the various administrative commands within naval aviation, Admiral Chester W. Nimitz, Commander in Chief, United States Pacific Fleet, directed a consolidation of various administrative functions for a more efficient command structure. This new command became Air Pacific Fleet, "to function as a Type Commander for fleet aircraft, to prepare general policy and doctrine for the operation of aviation units, to recommend the types, characteristics and numbers of aircraft required, and to carry out the strategic distribution of all air units in the Pacific area."

On July 29, 1942, Admiral Ernest King approved the recommendation and thus established Commander U.S. Naval Air Force, Pacific Fleet (COMNAVAIRPAC), effective September 1, 1942. Vice Admiral John Henry Towers became its commander soon afterwards.

In May 1949, the headquarters was moved from Pearl Harbor, Hawaii to Naval Air Station, North Island, California.

In October 2001, the Chief of Naval Operations redesignated Commander, Naval Air Force U.S. Atlantic Fleet (AIRPAC's East Coast counterpart) from a three star command into a two star command and placed it under AIRPAC's command in a "Lead-Follow" arrangement. Under this arrangement COMNAVAIRPAC became TYCOM for Air, and assumed the additional title of Commander, Naval Air Forces (COMNAVAIRFOR). The Chief of Naval Air Training (CNATRA) and the Commander, Naval Air Force Reserve (COMNAVAIRES) were also subsequently placed under the aegis of COMNAVAIRFOR.

== Past commanders ==
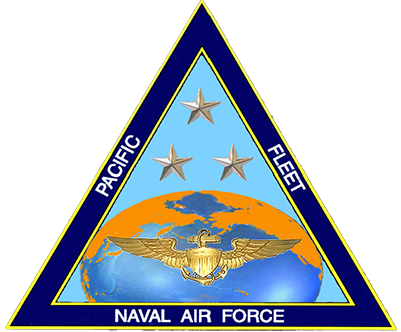
Logo for Naval Air Force, Pacific Fleet.

1. Vice Admiral John B. Nathman (August 2000 – August 2, 2002)
2. Vice Admiral Michael D. Malone (August 2, 2002 – August 17, 2004)
3. Vice Admiral James M. "Jim" Zortman (August 17, 2004 – June 22, 2007)
4. Vice Admiral Thomas J. "Tom" Kilcline Jr. (June 22, 2007 – July 1, 2010)
5. Vice Admiral Allen G. "Al" Myers IV (July 1, 2010 – October 4, 2012)
6. Vice Admiral David H. Buss (October 4, 2012 – January 22, 2015)
7. Vice Admiral Troy M. "Mike" Shoemaker (January 22, 2015 – January 11, 2018)
8. Vice Admiral DeWolfe Miller III (January 11, 2018 – October 2, 2020)
9. Vice Admiral Kenneth R. Whitesell (October 2, 2020 – September 7, 2023)
10. Vice Admiral Daniel Cheever (January 31, 2024 – February 2, 2026)
11. Vice Admiral Douglas C. Verissimo (February 2, 2026 – present)

== Subordinate commands ==
=== Commander, Patrol And Reconnaissance Group, Pacific ===
==== Commander, Patrol and Reconnaissance Wing TEN ====
- VP-1 Screaming Eagles
- VP-4 Skinny Dragons
- VP-9 Golden Eagles
- VP-40 Fighting Marlins
- VP-46 Grey Knights
- VP-47 Golden Swordsmen

=== Commander, Airborne Command, Control, Logistics Wing (COMACCLOGWING) ===
| Unit | Nickname | Aircraft | Home base | Notes |
|---|---|---|---|---|
| VAW-113 | Black Eagles | E-2 Hawkeye | Naval Base Ventura County | |
| VAW-115 | Liberty Bells | E-2 Hawkeye | Naval Base Ventura County | |
| VAW-116 | Sun Kings | E-2 Hawkeye | Naval Base Ventura County | |
| VAW-117 | Wallbangers | E-2 Hawkeye | Naval Base Ventura County | |
| VAW-120 | Greyhawks | E-2 Hawkeye C-2 Greyhound | Naval Station Norfolk Chambers Field | FRS |
| VAW-121 | Bluetails | E-2 Hawkeye | Naval Station Norfolk Chambers Field | |
| VAW-123 | Screwtops | E-2 Hawkeye | Naval Station Norfolk Chambers Field | |
| VAW-124 | Bear Aces | E-2 Hawkeye | Naval Station Norfolk Chambers Field | |
| VAW-125 | Tigertails | E-2 Hawkeye | Marine Corps Air Station Iwakuni | |
| VAW-126 | Seahawks | E-2 Hawkeye | Naval Station Norfolk Chambers Field | |
| VRC-30 | Providers | C-2 Greyhound | Naval Air Station North Island | |
| VRC-40 | Rawhides | C-2 Greyhound | Naval Station Norfolk Chambers Field | |
| Carrier Airborne Early; Warning Weapons School (CAEWWS) | | | | |

=== Commander, Strike Fighter Wing Pacific (COMSTRKFIGHTWINGPAC) ===
| Unit | Nickname | Aircraft | Home base | Notes |
|---|---|---|---|---|
| VFA-2 | Bounty Hunters | | | |
| VFA-14 | Top Hatters | | | |
| VFA-22 | Fighting Redcocks | | | |
| VFA-25 | Fist of the Fleet | | | |
| VFA-27 | Royal Maces | | (MCAS Iwakuni, Japan) | |
| VFA-41 | Black Aces | | | |
| VFA-94 | Mighty Shrikes | | | |
| VFA-102 | Diamondbacks | | (MCAS Iwakuni, Japan) | |
| VFA-113 | Stingers | | | |
| VFA-122 | Flying Eagles | | | (FRS) |
| VFA-136 | Knighthawks | | | |
| VFA-137 | Kestrels | | | |
| VFA-146 | Blue Diamonds | | | |
| VFA-151 | Fighting Vigilantes | | | |
| VFA-154 | Black Knights | | | |
| VFA-192 | Golden Dragons | | | |
| VFA-195 | Dambusters | | (MCAS Iwakuni, Japan) | |
| Strike Fighter Weapons School Pacific (SFWSPAC) | | | | |

=== Commander, Joint Strike Fighter Wing (COMJSFWING) ===
- VFA-86 Sidewinders
- VFA-97 Warhawks
- VFA-115 Eagles
- VFA-125 Rough Raiders (FRS)
- VFA-147 Argonauts

=== Commander, Electronic Attack Wing, Pacific (COMVAQWINGPAC) ===
- VAQ-129 Vikings (FRS)
- VAQ-130 Zappers
- VAQ-131 Lancers
- VAQ-132 Scorpions (Expeditionary)
- VAQ-133 Wizards
- VAQ-134 Garudas (Expeditionary)
- VAQ-135 Black Ravens (Expeditionary)
- VAQ-136 Gauntlets
- VAQ-137 Rooks
- VAQ-138 Yellowjackets (Expeditionary)
- VAQ-139 Cougars
- VAQ-140 Patriots
- VAQ-141 Shadowhawks (MCAS Iwakuni, Japan)
- VAQ-142 Gray Wolves
- VAQ-144 Main Battery
- Electronic Attack Weapons School (EAWS)

=== Commander, Helicopter Maritime Strike Wing Pacific (COMHSMWINGPAC) ===
- HSM-35 Magicians (Expeditionary)
- HSM-37 Easyriders (Expeditionary)
- HSM-41 Seahawks (FRS)
- HSM-49 Scorpions (Expeditionary)
- HSM-51 Warlords (Expeditionary) (NAF Atsugi, Japan)
- HSM-71 Raptors
- HSM-73 Battle Cats
- HSM-75 Wolfpack
- HSM-77 Saberhawks (NAF Atsugi, Japan)
- HSM-78 Blue Hawks
- Helicopter Maritime Strike Weapons School Pacific (HSMWSP)

=== Commander, Helicopter Sea Combat Wing Pacific (COMHSCWINGPAC) ===
- HSC-3 Merlins (FRS)
- HSC-4 Black Knights
- HSC-6 Indians
- HSC-8 Eightballers
- HSC-12 Golden Falcon (NAF Atsugi, Japan)
- HSC-14 Chargers
- HSC-21 Blackjacks (Expeditionary)
- HSC-23 Wildcards (Expeditionary)
- HSC-25 Island Knights (Expeditionary) (Andersen AFB, Guam)
- Helicopter Sea Combat Weapons School Pacific (HSCWSP)

=== Commander, Fleet Logistics Multi-Mission Wing (VRMWING) ===
- VRM-30 Titans
- VRM-40 Mighty Bisons
- VRM-50 Sunhawks (FRS)

=== Commander, Strategic Communications Wing ONE (COMSTRATCOMWING ONE) (Tinker Air Force Base, Oklahoma) ===
- VQ-3 Ironman
- VQ-4 Shadows
- VQ-7 (FRS)

=== Commander, Naval Air Training Command (CNATRA) ===
==== Commander, Training Air Wing One (TRAWING ONE) ====
- VT-7 Eagles
- VT-9 Tigers

==== Commander, Training Air Wing Two (TRAWING TWO) ====
- VT-21 Red Hawks
- VT-22 Golden Eagles

==== Commander, Training Air Wing Four (TRAWING FOUR) ====
- VT-27 Boomers
- VT-28 Rangers
- VT-31 Wise Owls
- VT-35 Stingrays

==== Commander, Training Air Wing Five (TRAWING FIVE) ====
- VT-2 Doerbirds
- VT-3 Red Knights
- VT-6 Shooters
- HT-8 Eightballers
- HT-18 Vigilant Eagles
- HT-28 Hellions

==== Commander, Training Air Wing Six (TRAWING SIX) ====
- VT-4 Warbucks
- VT-10 Wildcats
- VT-86 Sabrehawks

== See also ==
- Naval aviation
- Modern US Navy carrier air operations
- List of United States Navy aircraft designations (pre-1962)
- List of US Naval aircraft
- United States Naval Aviator
- Naval flight officer
- List of United States Navy aircraft wings
- Carrier air wing
- List of United States Navy aircraft squadrons
- Commander, Naval Air Force U.S. Atlantic Fleet
