= HSM-78 Blue Hawks =

Helicopter Maritime Strike Squadron Seven Eight (HSM-78)
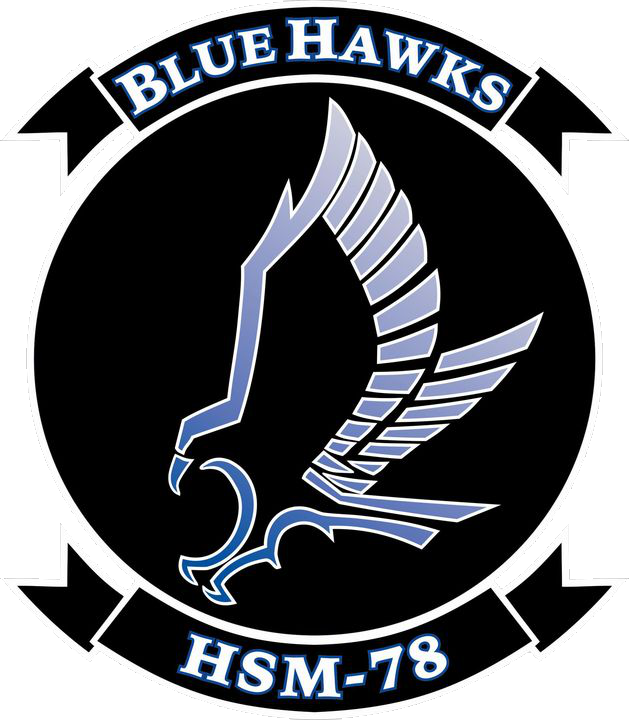
- Active: 1 March 2012 - present
- Country: United States of America
- Branch: United States Navy
- Type: Navy helicopter squadron
- Role: Surface warfare (SUW); Anti-submarine warfare (ASW); Electronic warfare (EW)
- Size: Approximately 300 personnel
- Part of: Carrier Air Wing 2, Carrier Strike Group 1
- Garrison/HQ: NAS North Island, California
- Nickname: Blue Hawks
- Mottos: Red, White, Blue Hawks! -- The Standard is Excellence!
- Engagements: Operation Prosperity Guardian; Operation Poseidon Archer

Commanders
- Commanding Officer: CDR Richard A. Murray, USN
- Executive Officer: CDR Ryan Willard, USN
- Command Master Chief: CMDCM LunYe' N. Richards, USN

Aircraft flown
- Helicopter: Sikorsky MH-60R Seahawk

Helicopter Maritime Strike Squadron SEVEN EIGHT (HSM-78) "Blue Hawks" is a United States Navy helicopter squadron based at Naval Air Station North Island in San Diego, California. HSM-78 was established on 1 March 2012 and is currently assigned to "Team Broadsword" of Carrier Air Wing 2. The squadron operates the Sikorsky MH-60R Seahawk helicopter and deploys on ships (aircraft carriers, cruisers, and destroyers) assigned to the Carl Vinson Carrier Strike Group.

The squadron's Plain Language Address is: HELMARSTRIKERON SEVEN EIGHT

== Photo Gallery ==
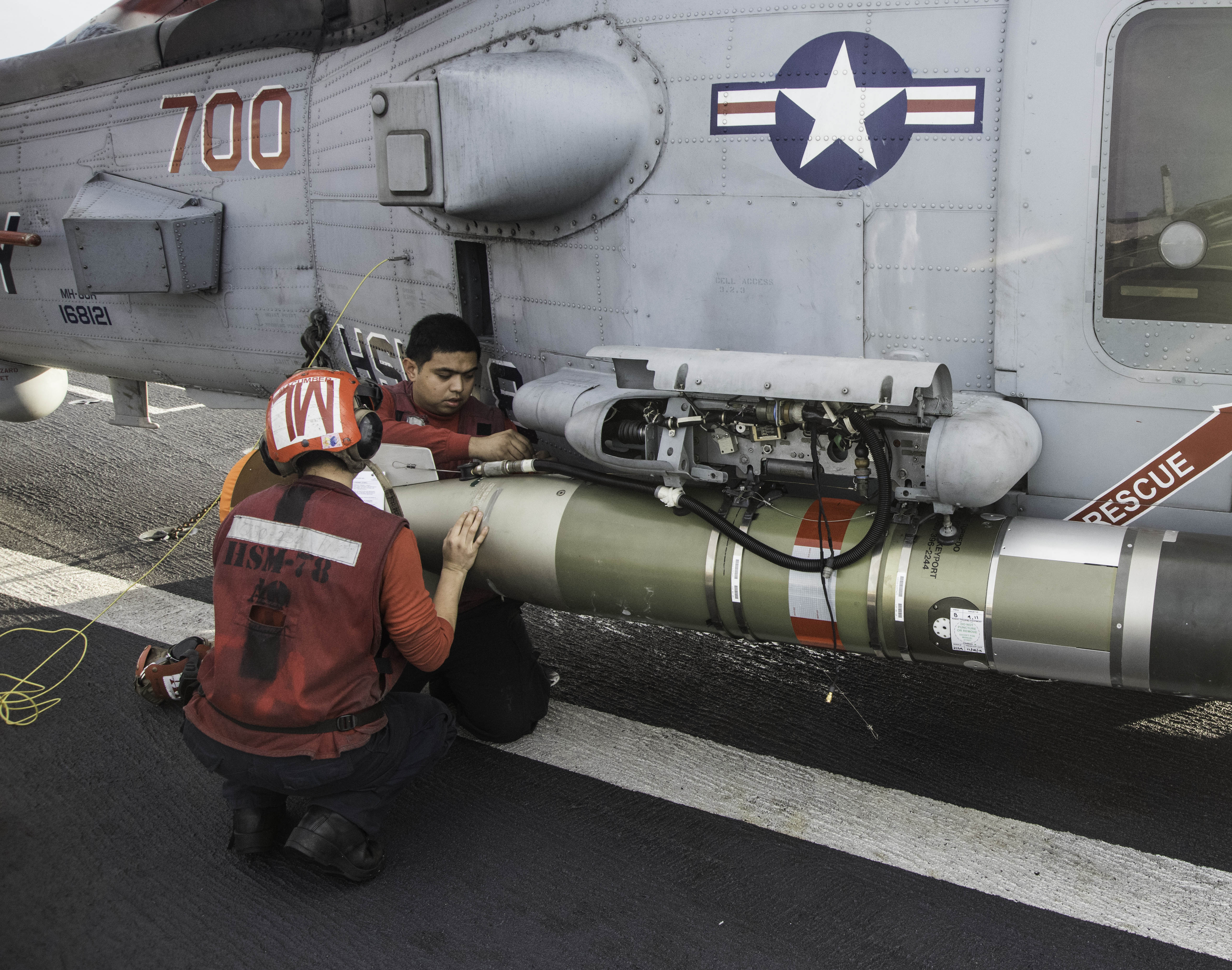
Blue Hawk Aviation Ordnancemen loading a Mk-54 REXTORP

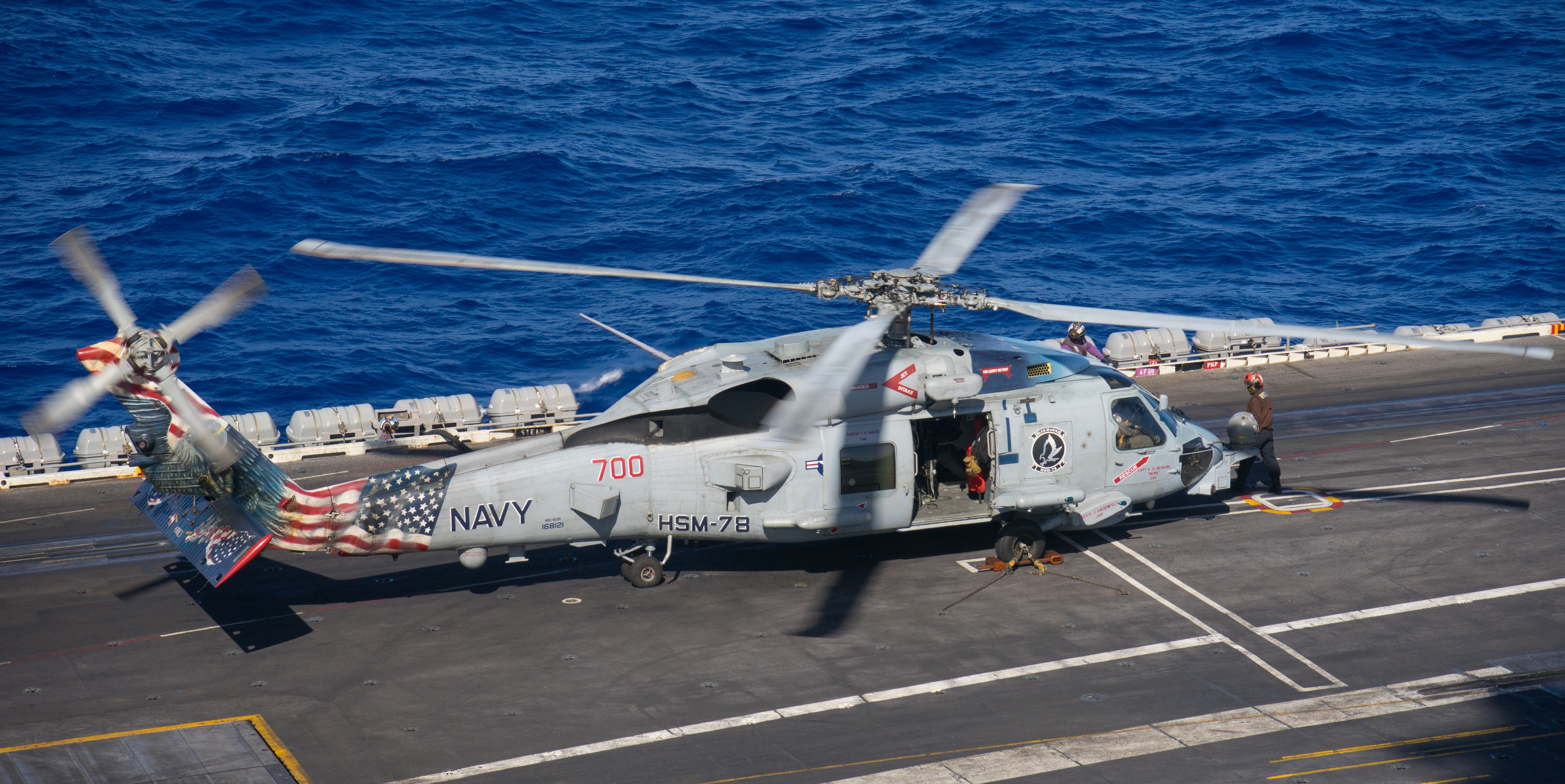
Blue Hawk 700 aboard USS Carl Vinson (CVN 70)

== History ==
=== Command Namesake ===
The "Blue Hawks" name dates back to 1977 when the original "Blue Hawks" of Helicopter Attack Squadron (Light) Five were established. HA(L)-5 continued the warrior legacy of Helicopter Attack Squadron (Light) Three (HAL-3) who served courageously during the Vietnam War. The current "Blue Hawks" of HSM-78 continue to grow the legend and the proud heritage of those warriors who went before them.

=== Commanding Officers ===
HSM-78 Commanding Officer Listing
Number	Name	Dates
1	CDR William H. Bucey, III, USN	1 March 2012 – 28 March 2013
2	CDR Richard H. Weitzel, USN	28 March 2013 – 23 June 2014
3	CDR Gregory P. Sawtell, USN	23 June 2014 – 4 July 2015
4	CDR Matthew R. Barr, USN	4 July 2015 – 13 October 2016
5	CDR Timothy C. Boehme, USN	13 October 2016 – 15 January 2018
6	CDR Eddie J. Park, USN	15 January 2018 – 15 May 2019
7	CDR Eric D. Hutter, USN	15 May 2019 – 3 September 2020
8	CDR Jeremiah N. Ragadio, USN	3 September 2020 – 29 November 2021
9	CDR Justin P. Eckhoff, USN	29 November 2021 – 18 February 2023
10	CDR David R. Terry, USN	18 February 2023 – 18 April 2024
11	CDR Brian T. Connor, USN	18 April 2024 – 21 April 2025
12	CDR Richard A. Murray, USN	21 April 2025 – Present

=== Operational History: Deployments and Major Exercises ===
- The squadron participated in the Rim of the Pacific (RIMPAC) Exercise 2014 aboard USS Ronald Reagan.
- On 20 August 2014, HSM-78 Detachments 1 and 2 returned from separate, but simultaneous 7-month deployments aboard USS Pinckney and USS Kidd, where, in addition to participating in Cooperation Afloat, Readiness and Training (CARAT) Exercise and other maritime security operations, also participated in the search of a missing Malaysia Airlines passenger jet.
- On 16 October 2014, HSM-78 Detachment 3 returned from a 7-month deployment aboard USS Wayne E. Meyer.
- On 9 January 2015, a HSM-78 Detachment 4 returned from a 7-month deployment to the Western Pacific and the Indian Ocean, participating in RIMPAC, Valiant Shield, and Keen Sword exercises, aboard USS Cape St. George.
- The squadron conducted a Southern Seas deployment aboard USS George Washington in 2015.
- On 26 April 2017, an MH-60R Seahawk of HSM-78 crashed off the coast of Guam during a deployment to the Western Pacific on the guided missile destroyer USS Dewey. All three crew members were safely recovered.
- On 22 June 2017, the squadron returned from a 6-month deployment to the U.S. 7th Fleet area of responsibility.
- On 12 April 2018, the squadron returned from a 3-month deployment to the Western Pacific.
- A squadron detachment participated in Silent Forces Exercise (SIFOREX) in April 2018 aboard USS Lake Champlain in the U.S. 4th Fleet area of responsibility.
- The squadron participated in the Rim of the Pacific (RIMPAC) Exercise 2018 aboard USS Carl Vinson.
- In July 2019, the squadron participated in Exercise Northern Strike 2019 at the Alpena Combat Readiness Training Center, located in the National All-Domain Warfighting Center in northern Michigan.
- In August 2021, the squadron deployed with the Carl Vinson Carrier Strike Group on the first deployment with the F-35C and CMV-22, dubbed as the "Air Wing of the Future."

=== Squadron Awards ===
- On 16 May 2019, the squadron was awarded the Admiral J.S. "Jimmy" Thach Award at the Naval Helicopter Association (NHA) National Symposium for outstanding achievement and contribution to Naval Aviation. The squadron was also awarded the Battle Effectiveness (Battle "E") Award for achieving the highest standards of cost-wise and performance readiness, recognizing the unit's training and operational achievements while including a balance that incentivizes effectiveness and cost-wise readiness.
- On 2 October 2020, the Navy and Marine Corps Public Health Center announced that HSM-78 was awarded the Blue H Navy Surgeon General's Health Promotion and Wellness Award, at the Gold Star level, for excellence in workplace health promotion policies, activities, and outcomes.
- On 17 March 2021, the Blue Hawks were awarded the Chief of Naval Operations (CNO) Aviation Safety Award for Fiscal Year 2020 for their "exceptional professionalism, commitment to excellence, solid leadership and teamwork, the high-velocity outcomes and in-depth risk management culture which resulted in safe and effective operations." The same day, the squadron was also awarded the Commander, US Pacific Fleet Retention Excellence Award for Fiscal Year 2020.
- On 30 March 2022, the squadron was awarded the Battle "E" Award for calendar year 2021, her second award.

=== Major Personnel Achievements ===
- Aviation Maintenance Administrationman 1st Class (AW/SW) Sania Mendez was a finalist for the Commander, Naval Air Force, U.S. Pacific Fleet 2013 Sea Sailor of the Year
- On 15 January 2020, Yeoman Third Class (AW) John Norman was awarded the United Service Organization’s (USO) Service Member of the Year.
- On 24 July 2020, the squadron's fourth Commanding Officer, Matthew R. Barr became the first ever rotary wing aviator to become a Carrier Air Wing Commander, or "CAG," when he assumed command of Carrier Air Wing ONE (CVW-1).

== HSM-78 Official Links ==
1. Official Command Website
2. Official Command Facebook
3. Official Command Instagram
4. Official Command YouTube
