= VRM-50 =

US Navy aircraft squadron

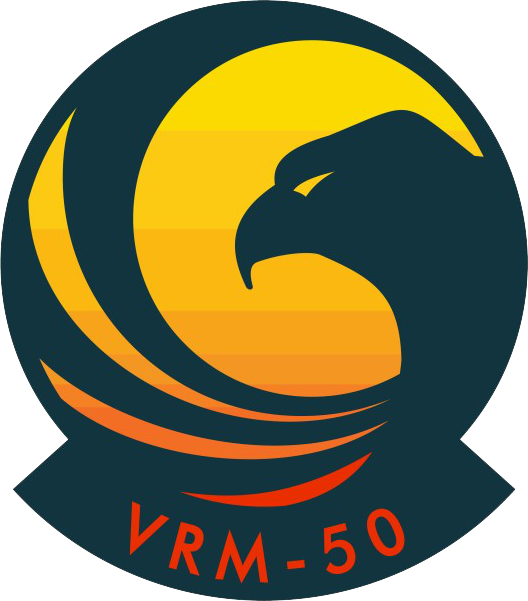
- Country: United States
- Branch: United States Navy
- Type: Squadron
- Role: Fleet Logistics
- Garrison/HQ: Naval Air Station North Island
- Nickname: Sunhawks

Commanders
- Current commander: Franz Bien-Aime

Aircraft flown
- Transport: Bell Boeing CMV-22B Osprey

Fleet Logistics Multi-Mission Squadron 50 (VRM-50) is a logistical sustainment squadron of the United States Navy.

The squadron was established on October 2020 at Naval Air Station North Island, California. The squadron was created as from the U.S. Navy's transition away from the Grumman C-2 Greyhound and to the Bell-Boeing CMV-22B Osprey.

Currently VRM-50 is a Fleet Replacement Squadron.

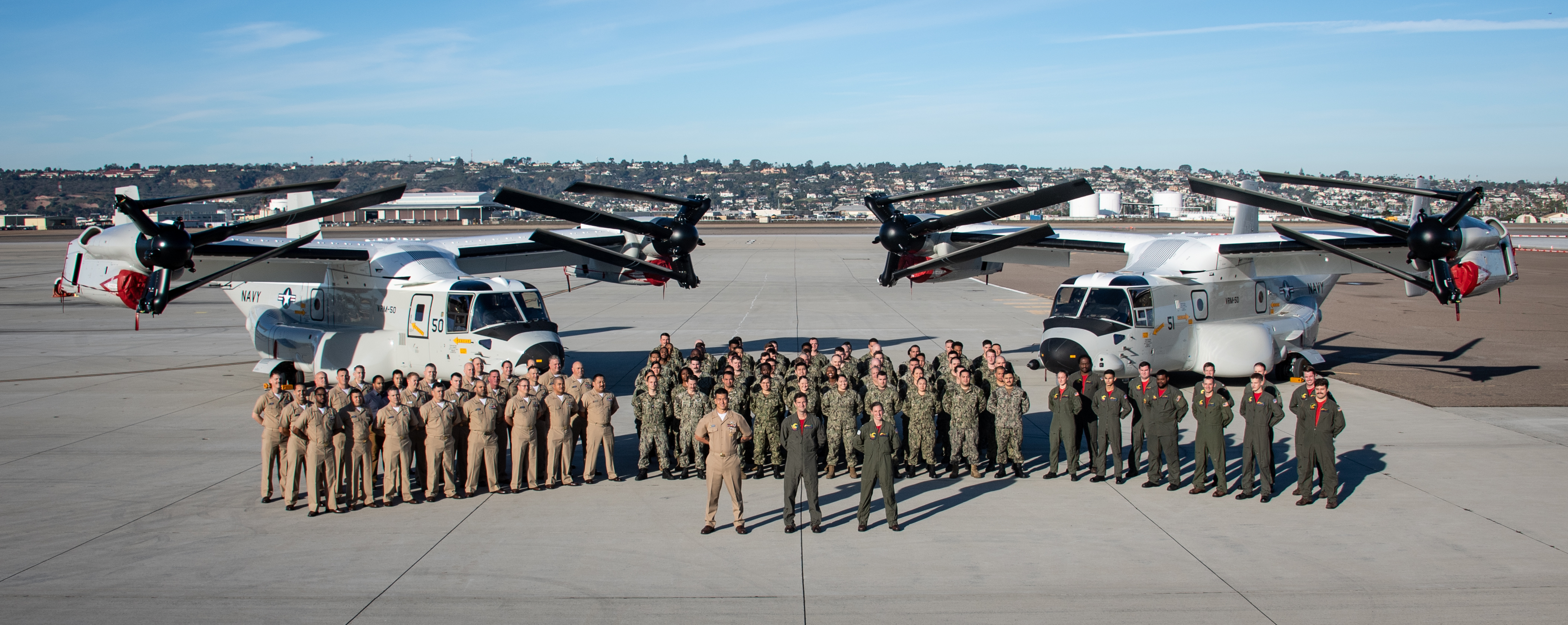
VRM-50 personnel at Naval Air Station North Island
