= USS John P. Murtha =

US Navy amphibious-transport ship

USS John P. Murtha (LPD-26)
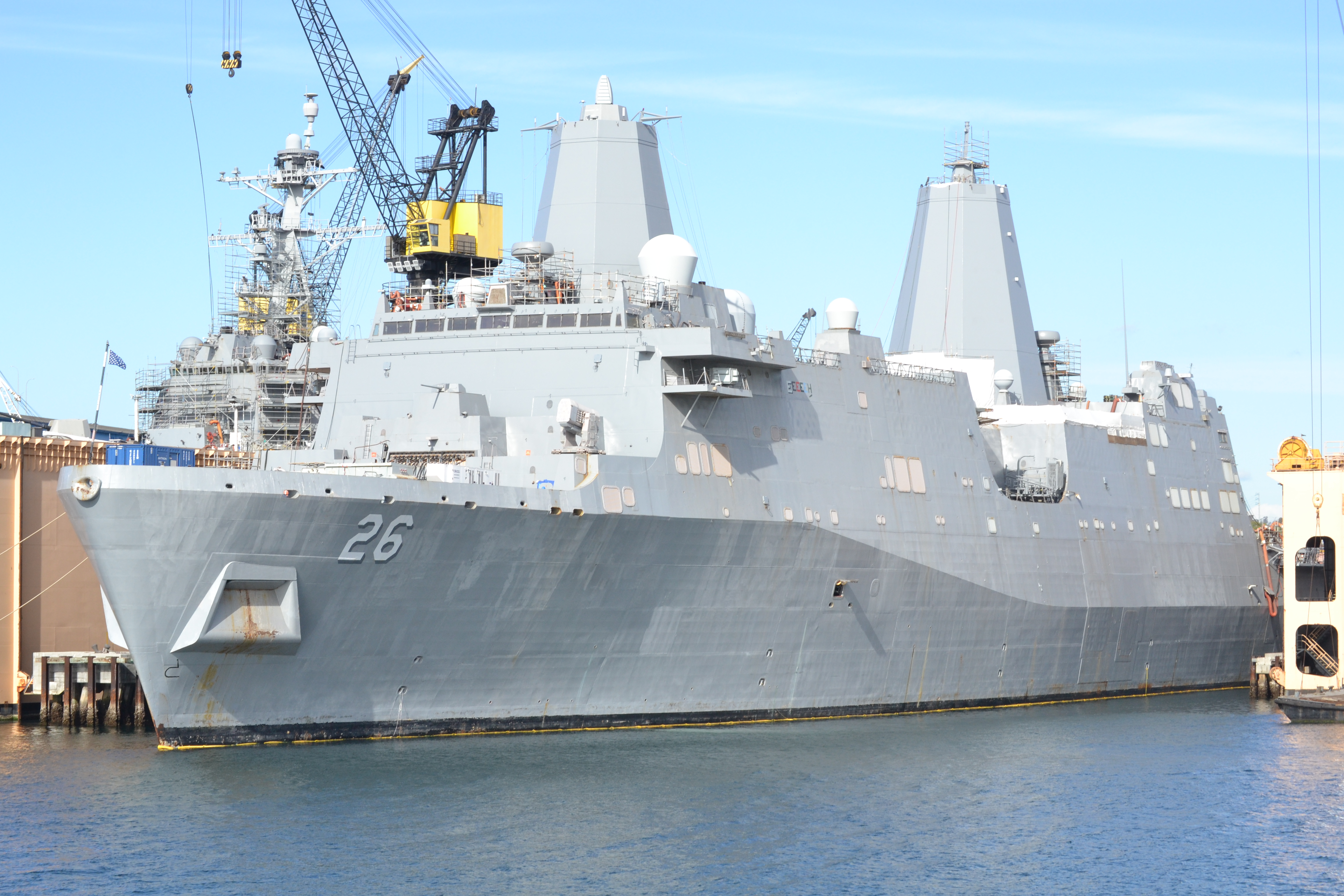
- USS John P. Murtha on 27 November 2024

History

United States
- Name: John P. Murtha
- Namesake: John Murtha
- Awarded: 1 April 2011
- Builder: Ingalls Shipbuilding
- Laid down: 6 February 2012
- Launched: 30 October 2014
- Sponsored by: Donna S. Murtha
- Christened: 21 March 2015
- Acquired: 13 May 2016
- Commissioned: 8 October 2016
- Home port: San Diego
- Identification: MMSI number: 368926266; Callsign: NJPM; Pennant number: LPD-26
- Motto: Make A Difference
- Status: in active service
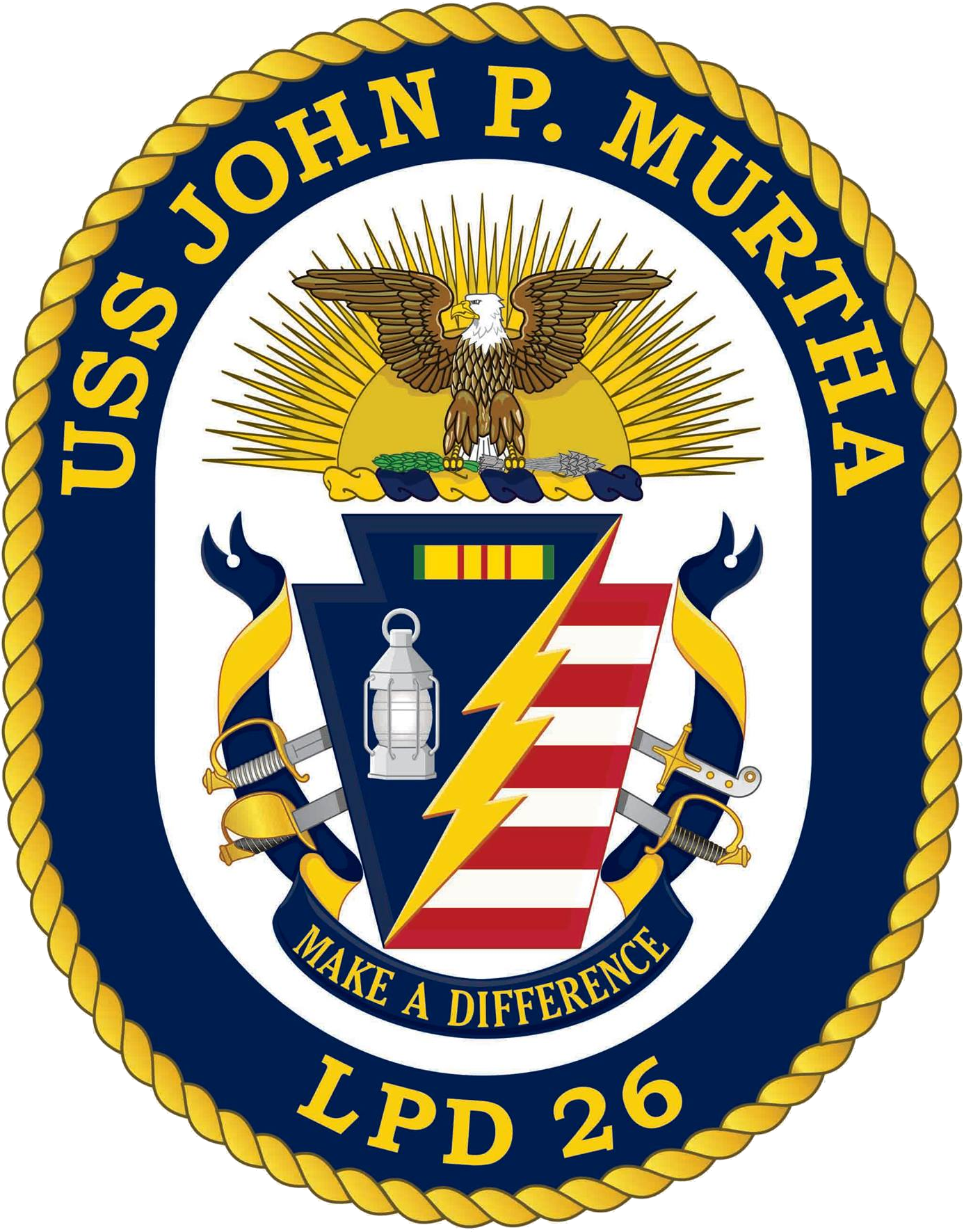
- Badge

General characteristics
- Class & type: San Antonio-class amphibious transport dock
- Displacement: 25,000 tons full
- Length: 684 ft 1 in (208.5 m) overall, 660 ft 9 in (201.4 m) waterline
- Beam: 104 ft 8 in (31.9 m) extreme, 96 ft 9 in (29.5 m) waterline
- Draft: 23 ft 0 in (7 m)
- Propulsion: 4 × Colt-Pielstick diesel engines, two shafts, 40,000 hp (30,000 kW)
- Speed: 22 knots (41 km/h; 25 mph)
- Boats & landing craft carried: Two LCACs (air cushion); or one LCU (conventional)
- Capacity: 699 (66 officers, 633 enlisted); surge to 800 total.
- Complement: 32 officers, 364 enlisted
- Armament: 2 × 30 mm Bushmaster II cannons, for surface threat defense; 2 × Rolling Airframe Missile launchers for air defense
- Aircraft carried: Launch or land two CH53E Super Stallion helicopters or two MV-22 Osprey tilt rotor aircraft or up to four CH-46 Sea Knight helicopters, AH-1, H-60, or UH-1 helicopters.

USS John P. Murtha (LPD-26) is the 10th San Antonio-class amphibious transport dock ship of the United States Navy, and is named in honor of Congressman John Murtha (1932–2010) of Pennsylvania. John P. Murtha is homeported at Naval Base San Diego.

== History ==
On 9 April 2010, Secretary of the Navy Ray Mabus announced that the Navy's 10th San Antonio-class amphibious transport dock would be named John P. Murtha (LPD-26). A former United States Marine Corps officer, Murtha was the first Vietnam War veteran elected to the U.S. House of Representatives, in 1974. Murtha served as either chairman or ranking minority member of the House Defense Appropriations Subcommittee from 1989 to 2010.

The contract to build John P. Murtha was awarded to Ingalls Shipbuilding on 1 April 2011. John P. Murtha's keel was laid down on 6 June 2012 at the Ingalls Shipbuilding yard in Pascagoula, Mississippi. The ship was launched on 30 October 2014, christened five months later on 21 March 2015, delivered to the Navy on 13 May 2016, placed in active service on 11 August 2016, and commissioned on 8 October 2016. The ship was sponsored by Congressman Murtha's daughter, Donna S. Murtha.

USS John P. Murtha served as the recovery vessel for Artemis II, the first crewed mission beyond low Earth orbit and to the Moon since Apollo 17 in 1972.

=== Naming controversy ===
The decision to deviate from the naming convention for the class, which prior to John P. Murtha had been named after cities or locations, was not without controversy. Some members of Congress questioned the appropriateness of naming a military vessel for Murtha after his call for withdrawing from the Iraq War in 2005 and his public accusation of Marines involved in the Haditha massacre. Similar questions arose when, in 2012, Secretary Mabus proposed naming USS Gabrielle Giffords (LCS-10) after former Congresswoman Gabby Giffords. In connection with this controversy, Sen. Roy Blunt added an amendment to the 2012 National Defense Authorization Act which required the Navy to report to Congress on how effectively it was adhering to established naming conventions.

The resulting report, released in 2015, demonstrated a consistent tradition of naval secretaries making "occasional exceptions" to established ship-naming conventions, beginning in 1798 when Navy Secretary Benjamin Stoddert broke with naming convention by naming one of the original six frigates of the United States Navy as USS Chesapeake.

=== Artemis II recovery ===
Perhaps the most famous thing the USS John P. Mertha did was when on April 10, 2026, she was the recovery vessel for the Orion spacecraft Integrity and its crew during the Artemis II mission. Captain Erik Kenny served as the vessel's commanding officer during this mission. It carried two MH-60S Seahawk helicopters from Helicopter Sea Combat Squadron 23.
