= Naval Air Station North Island =

Naval Air Station in Northern Coronado Peninsula, San Diego County, California

- Halsey Field
- Part of Naval Base Coronado
- San Diego, California in the United States
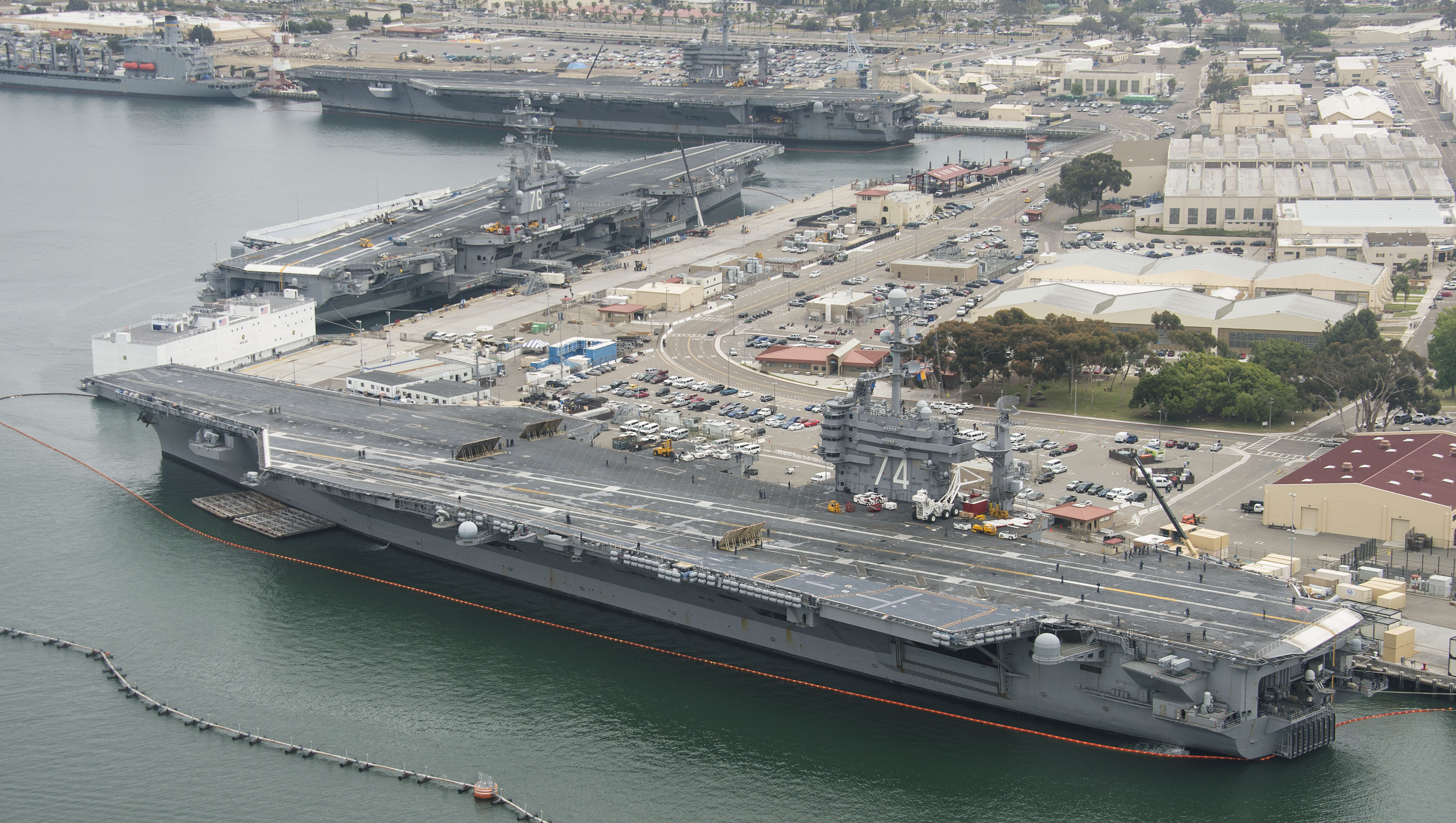
- Three US Navy Nimitz-class aircraft carriers, USS Carl Vinson (CVN-70), USS Ronald Reagan (CVN-76), and USS John C. Stennis (CVN-74) pierside at NAS North Island during June 2015

Site information
- Type: Naval Air Station/Naval Base
- Owner: Department of Defense
- Operator: US Navy
- Controlled by: Navy Region Southwest
- Condition: Operational
- Website: Official website

Location
- Location in the United States
- Coordinates: 32°41′57″N 117°12′55″W

Site history
- Built: 1917 (as NAS San Diego)
- In use: 1917 – present

Garrison information
- Current commander: Captain John DePree

Airfield information
- Identifiers: IATA: NZY, ICAO: KNZY, FAA LID: NZY, WMO: 722906
- Elevation: 7.8 metres (26 ft) AMSL
Runways
Direction	Length and surface
18/36	2,438.4 metres (8,000 ft) Porous European Mix
11/29	2,286 metres (7,500 ft) Porous European Mix
- Other airfield facilities: 13x helipads

U.S. National Register of Historic Places

U.S. Historic district
- Official name: Naval Air Station, San Diego, Historic District
- Criteria: Event; Architecture/engineering
- Designated: 21 May 1991
- Reference no.: 91000590
- Architects: Bertram Grosvenor Goodhue; Navy Bureau of Yards and Docks
- Architecture: Mission and Spanish Revival
- Areas of significance: Military; architecture

Naval Air Station North Island, also known as NAS North Island (IATA: NZY, ICAO: KNZY, FAA LID: NZY), is a United States Navy installation located at the north end of the Coronado peninsula on San Diego Bay in Coronado, California. It is part of Naval Base Coronado (NBC), the largest aerospace-industrial complex in the United States Navy. NAS North Island is the home port of several aircraft carriers of the United States Navy.

The commanding officer of NAS North Island (NASNI) is also the Commanding Officer, Naval Base Coronado (NBC). As such, they command or administer NASNI and seven other naval facilities: Naval Amphibious Base Coronado (NABC); Naval Outlying Landing Field Imperial Beach; Silver Strand Training Complex; Remote Training Site, Warner Springs; Mountain Warfare Training Camp Michael Monsoor; Camp Morena; and Naval Auxiliary Landing Field San Clemente Island.

NBC, with only its commands in the metropolitan San Diego area, brackets the city of Coronado from the entrance to San Diego Bay to the Mexican border. NAS North Island itself is host to 23 aviation squadrons and 80 additional tenant commands and activities—one of which, the Fleet Readiness Center Southwest, is San Diego's largest aerospace employer.

== Organization ==
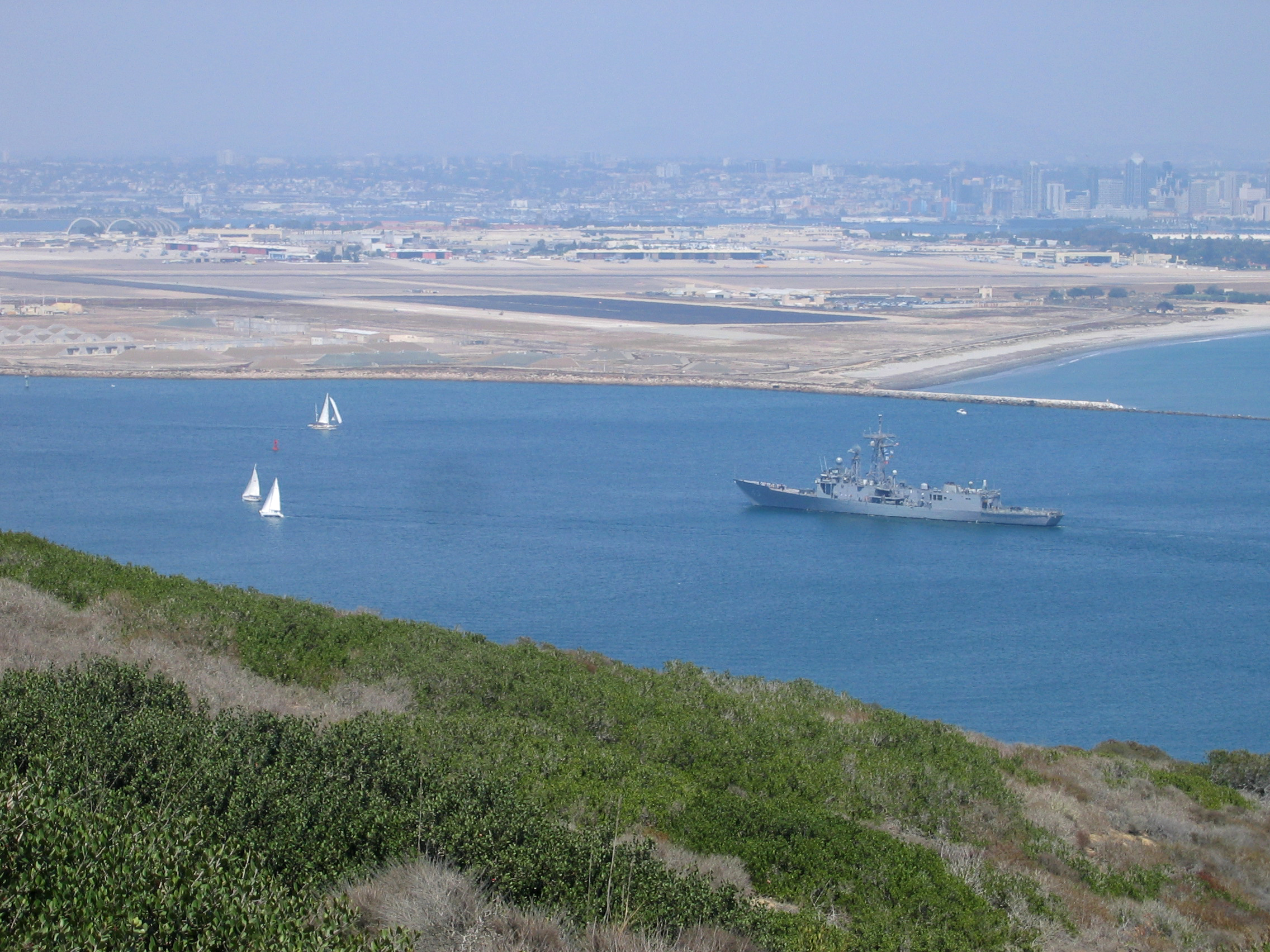
USS Thach and the NAS as seen from Cabrillo National Monument

NAS North Island also operates two other airfields in the Southern California region. One is Naval Auxiliary Landing Facility (NALF) San Clemente Island, located approximately 70 miles (110 km) northwest of San Diego in the Channel Islands. The other is Naval Outlying Landing Field (NOLF) Imperial Beach. Formerly an independent naval air station, NOLF Imperial Beach is located in the city of Imperial Beach, on the U.S.-Mexico border, 10 miles (16 km) south of NAS North Island. The air station was known as Ream Field in the 1950s and 1960s.

NAS North Island resembles a small city in its facility content and its operations. It has its own police and fire departments, as well as advanced military security stations. It has large factory-type buildings which comprise the Naval Aviation Depot, employing 3,300 civilians, and its own commissary, Navy Exchange, and housing units. Recreation facilities include officer, chief petty officer and enlisted clubs, movie theater, golf course, tennis courts, bowling alley, parks and beaches.

Its airfield has over 230 stationed aircraft, and its quay wall is homeport to three aircraft carriers: USS Abraham Lincoln, USS Carl Vinson, and USS Theodore Roosevelt. Additionally, the base was home to the Navy's only Deep Submergence Rescue Vehicles, Mystic (DSRV-1) and Avalon (DSRV-2). The DSRV motor vessel support ships are also homeported here.

North Island is headquarters for four major military flag staffs including:

- Commander, Naval Air Forces (COMNAVAIRFOR or CNAF), responsible for maintenance and training of all naval aircraft and aircraft carriers in the Atlantic Fleet, Pacific Fleet, the Naval Air Reserve, and the Naval Air Training Command
- Commander, Naval Air Force, U.S. Pacific Fleet (COMNAVAIRPAC or CNAP), responsible for maintenance and training of all naval aircraft and aircraft carriers in the Pacific Fleet. This is a dual-hatted post in that it is concurrently held by the Commander, Naval Air Forces
- Commander, Carrier Strike Group One
- Commander, Carrier Strike Group Seven

With all the ships in port, the population of the station is nearly 35,000 active duty military, selected reserve military, and civilian personnel. Department of Defense (DoD) contractors perform transportation flights from the air station to NALF San Clemente Island. Contractors also provide tactical training warfare for the DoD in joint efforts with the U.S. Navy and U.S. Marine Corps. These aircraft include C-26 Metroliner, Learjet, Gulfstream, and Twin Otter aircraft.

== History ==
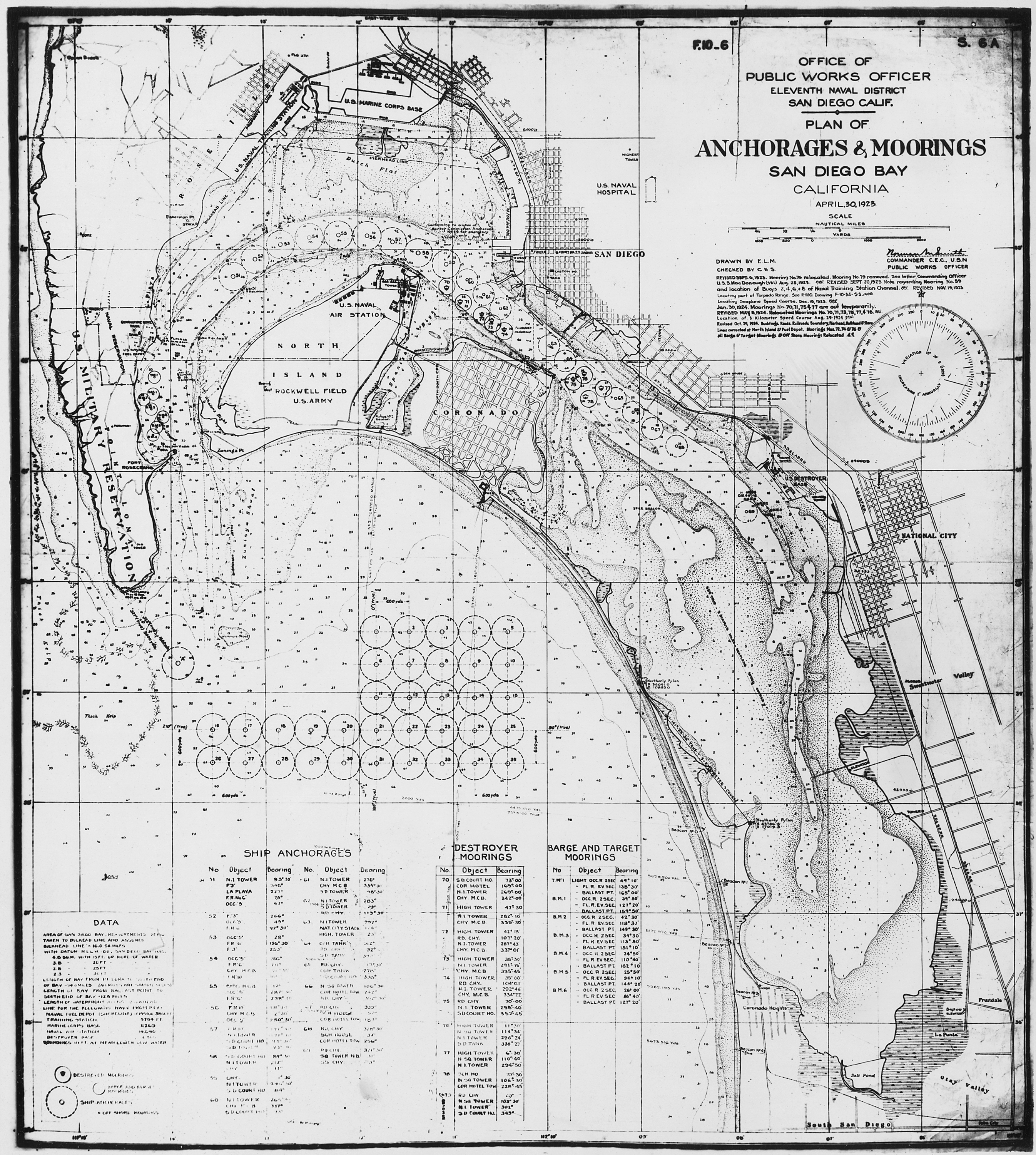
Military map of San Diego Bay, featuring North Island, Coronado, National City, and the surrounding area circa 1923

North Island was commissioned a Naval Air Station in 1917, called Naval Air Station San Diego until 1955. On August 15, 1963, the station was granted official recognition as the "Birthplace of Naval Aviation" by resolution of the House Armed Services Committee.

The U.S. Navy's first aviator, Lieutenant Theodore Ellyson, and many of his colleagues were trained at North Island starting as early as 1911. This was just eight years after Orville and Wilbur Wright flew the first manned aircraft at Kitty Hawk, North Carolina. At that time, North Island was an uninhabited sand flat. It had been used in the late 19th century for horseback riding and hunting by guests of J. D. Spreckels's resort hotel, the Hotel del Coronado.

North Island derived its name from the original geography. In the nineteenth century it was referred to as North Coronado Island, because it was separated from South Coronado (now the city of Coronado) by a shallow bay known as the Spanish Bight, which was later filled in 1945 during World War II. In 1886, North Coronado Island and South Coronado were purchased by a developer to become a residential resort. South Coronado, which is not an island but the terminus of a peninsula known as the Silver Strand, became the city of Coronado.

However, North Coronado was never developed. Instead, Glenn Curtiss opened a flying school and held a lease to the property until the beginning of World War I. Curtiss invited both the U.S. Army and U.S. Navy to use the site for aviation training, with the Navy being the first to open a station in 1912. However the Navy abandoned its camp and did not return for five years, while the Army established an aviation school in 1913 at the southern end of the island. In 1917, Congress appropriated the land, and two airfields were commissioned on its sandy flats. The Navy started with a tent city known as "Camp Trouble". As its name suggests, things did not always go well in the early days. The Navy shared North Island with the Army's Signal Corps, Air Service, and Air Corp's Rockwell Field until 1937, when the Army left and the Navy expanded its operations to cover the whole of North Island.

In 1914, then-unknown aircraft builder Glenn Martin took off and demonstrated his pusher aircraft over the island with a flight that included the first parachute jump in the San Diego area. The jump was made by a ninety-pound civilian woman named Tiny Broadwick. Other aviation milestones originating at North Island included the first seaplane flight in 1911, the first mid-air refueling, and the first non-stop transcontinental flight, both in 1923. One of history's most famous aviation feats was the flight of Charles A. Lindbergh from New York to Paris in May 1927. That flight originated at Rockwell Field on North Island on May 10, 1927, when Lindbergh began the first leg of his journey. Forefathers of today's "Blue Angels", the three-plane "Sea Hawks" from VF-6B, the "Felix the Cat" squadron, were thrilling audiences with flight demonstrations as early as 1928. They demonstrated the training skills of Navy fighter and bomber pilots and on many occasions, flew their aircraft in formation with the wings tethered together.

The list of American military pilots trained at North Island reads like the Who's Who of aviation; however, the U.S. was not the only country interested in aviation early in the twentieth century. Six years before the Naval Air Station was commissioned, Glenn Curtiss trained the first group of Japanese aviators at his flying school on North Island. Among them were a Lieutenant Yamada, later the head of the Imperial Japanese Navy's Naval Aviation arm in World War II and Chikuhei Nakajima, founder of Nakajima Aircraft Company.

Even the base's first commanding officer, Lieutenant Commander Earl Winfield Spencer Jr., USN, added a degree of celebrity to North Island. His wife was Wallis Warfield, a prominent socialite who was to remarry twice and finally become Wallis Warfield Spencer Simpson Windsor, better known as the Duchess of Windsor, for whom King Edward VIII abdicated his throne in 1936.

During World War II, North Island was the major continental U.S. base supporting the operating forces in the Pacific. Those forces included over a dozen aircraft carriers, the Coast Guard, Army, Marines, and Seabees. The city of Coronado became home to most of the aircraft factory workers and dependents of the mammoth base which was operating around the clock. Major USO entertainment shows and bond drives were held weekly at the Ship's Service auditorium, which was later replaced by the 2,100 seat Lowry Theater. Famous people stationed here or on ships home ported here during the war years included Douglas Fairbanks Jr., Guy Madison, future television cowboy star of the 1950s and 1960s as Wild Bill Hickok, was at that time Seaman Bob Mosely, a lifeguard at the NAS crews' pool. Stars like the Marx Brothers and Bob Hope appeared regularly at USO shows at the auditorium.

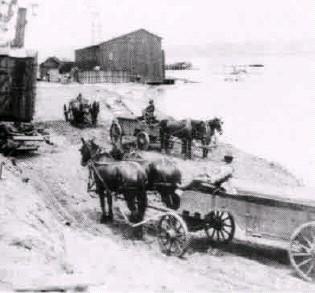
Construction of the seaplane ramp in 1918

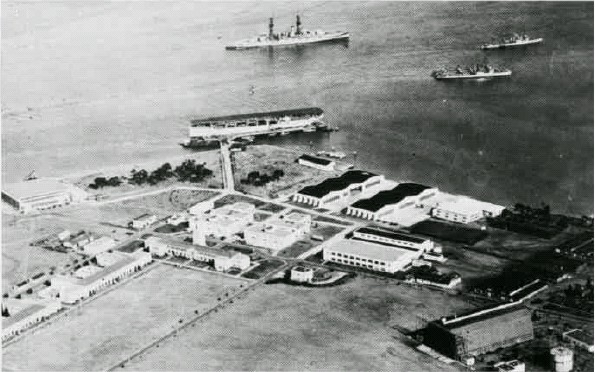
USS Langley at North Island, 1925

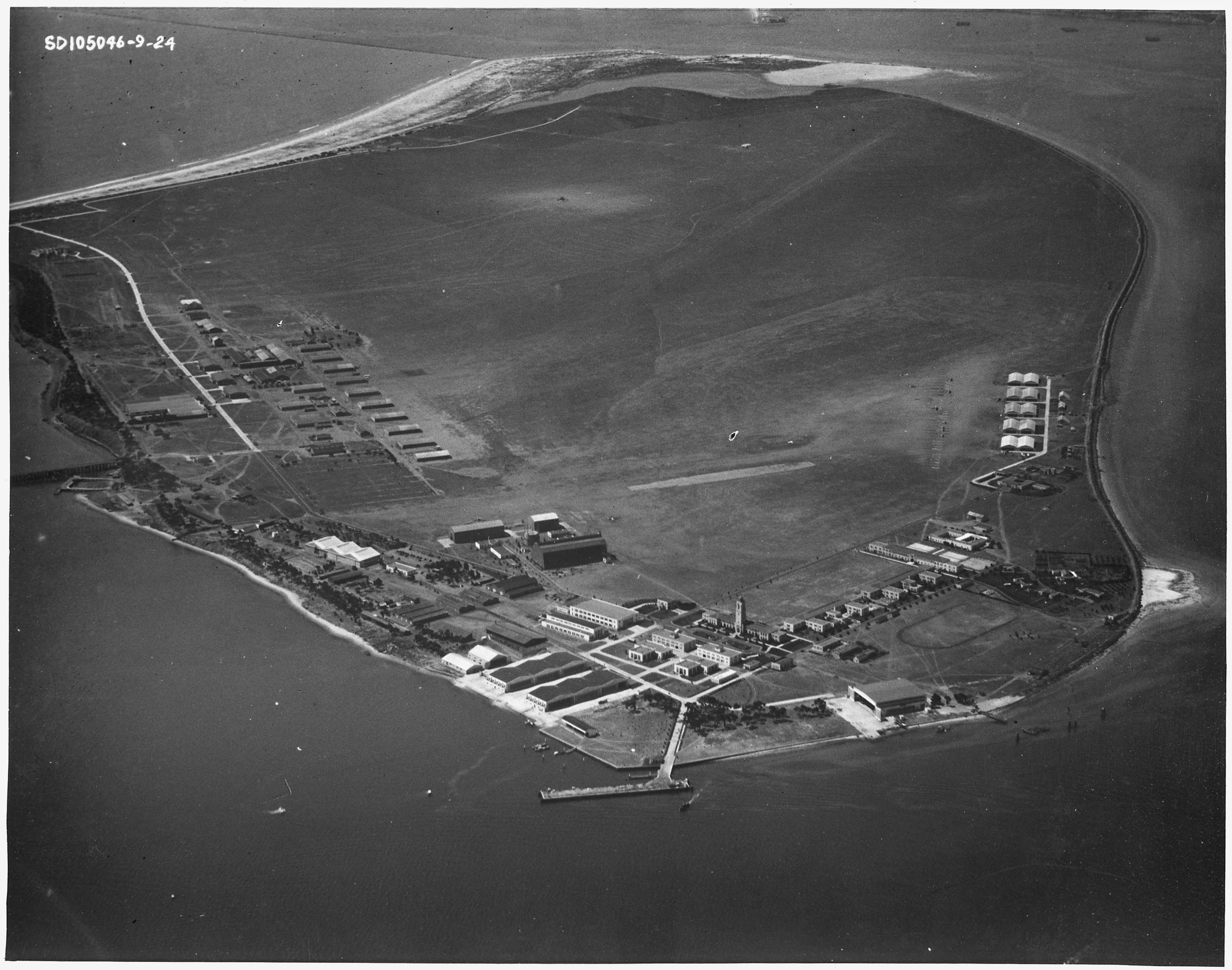
North Island in 1924

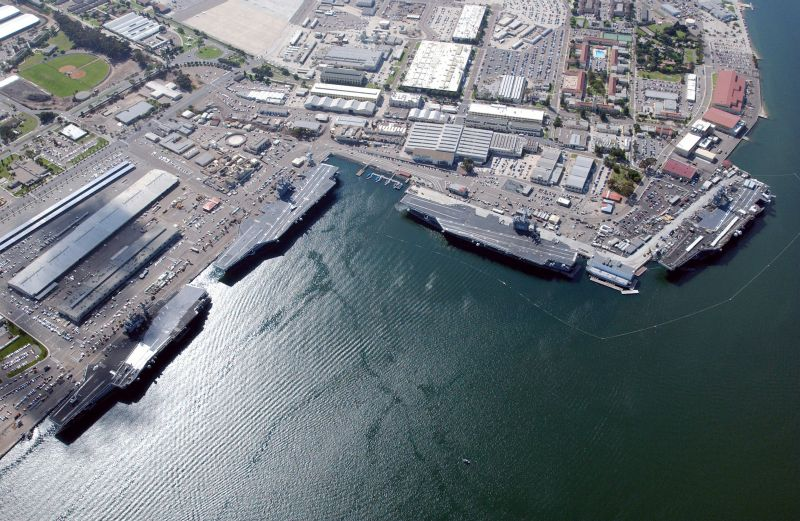
Four carriers (USS Constellation, USS Carl Vinson, USS Nimitz, USS John C. Stennis) at North Island, 2002

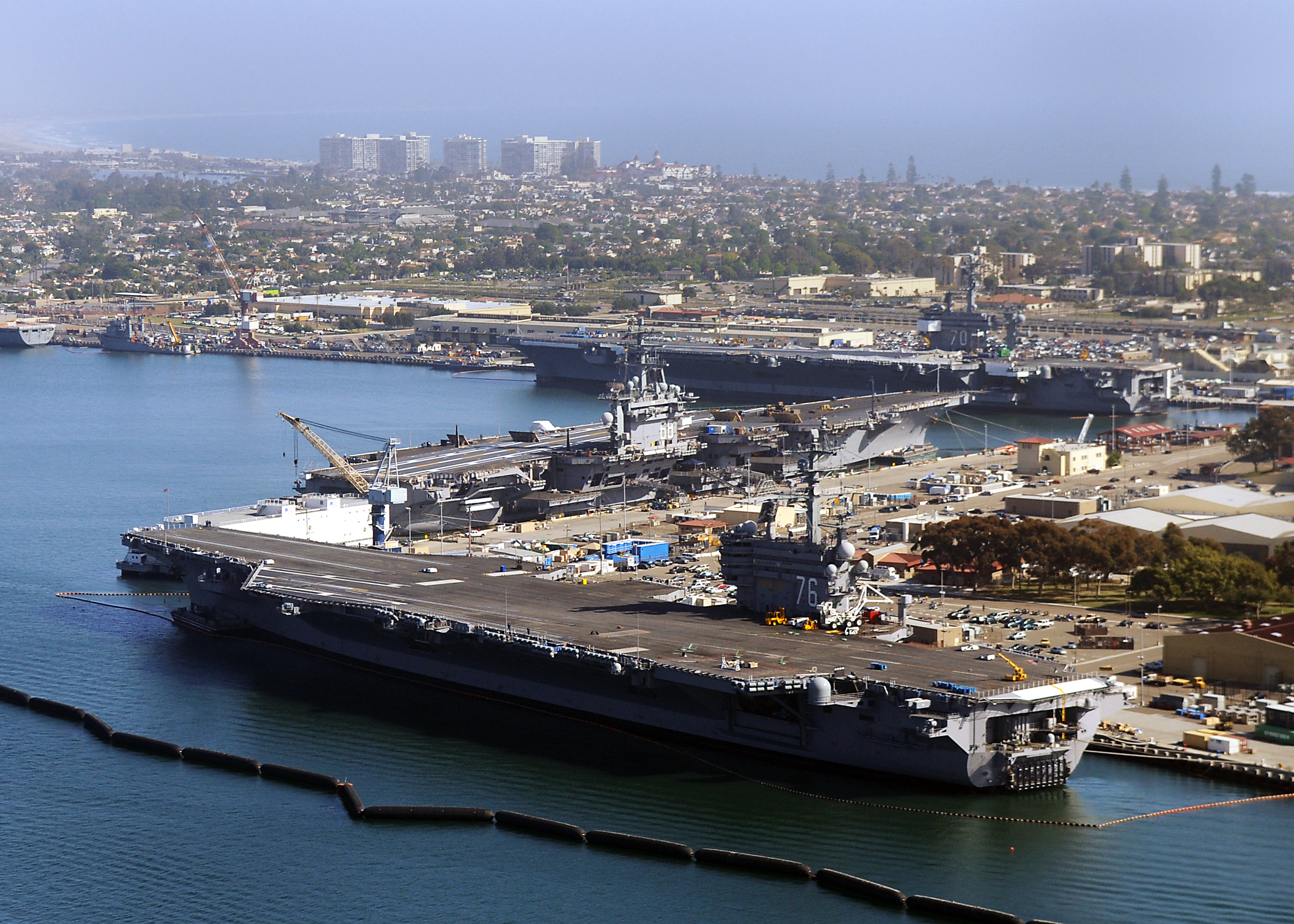
Three carriers (U.S.S. Carl Vinson, U.S.S. Nimitz, USS Ronald Reagan) at North Island, 2010

== Tenant squadrons ==
Insignia	Squadron	Code	Callsign/Nickname	Operational Assignment
	Helicopter Sea Combat Squadron 3	HSC-3 Merlins	Merlins	Fleet Replacement Squadron
	Helicopter Sea Combat Squadron	HSC-4 Black Knights	Black Knights	USS Carl Vinson (CVN-70)
	Helicopter Sea Combat Squadron	HSC-6 Indians	Indians	USS Nimitz (CVN-68)
	Helicopter Sea Combat Squadron	HSC-8 Eightballers	Eightballers	USS Theodore Roosevelt (CVN-71)
	Helicopter Sea Combat Squadron	HSC-14 Chargers	Chargers	USS Abraham Lincoln (CVN-72)
	Helicopter Sea Combat Squadron	HSC-21 Blackjacks	Blackjacks	Expeditionary Support Squadron
	Helicopter Sea Combat Squadron	HSC-23 Wildcards	Wildcards	Expeditionary Support Squadron
	Helicopter Maritime Strike Squadron 35	HSM-35 Magicians	Magicians	Expeditionary Support Squadron
	Helicopter Maritime Strike Squadron	HSM-41 Seahawks	Seahawks	Fleet Replacement Squadron
	Helicopter Maritime Strike Squadron	HSM-49 Scorpions	Scorpions	Fleet Replacement Squadron
	Helicopter Maritime Strike Squadron	HSM-71 Raptors	Raptors	USS Abraham Lincoln (CVN-72)
	Helicopter Maritime Strike Squadron	HSM-73 BattleCats	Battle Cats	USS Nimitz (CVN-68)
	Helicopter Maritime Strike Squadron	HSM-75 Wolf Pack	Wolf Pack	USS Theodore Roosevelt (CVN-71)
	Helicopter Maritime Strike Squadron	HSM-78 Blue Hawks	Blue Hawks	USS Carl Vinson (CVN-70)
	Fleet Logistics Support Squadron 57	VR-57 Conquistadors	Conquistadors	Fleet Logistics Multi-Mission Wing (VRMW)
	Fleet Logistics Multi-Mission Squadron 30	VRM-30 Titans	Rudy	USS Carl Vinson (CVN-70)
	Fleet Logistics Multi-Mission Squadron 50	VRM-50 Sunhawks	Sunhawks	Fleet Replacement Squadron

MH-60S Seahawk
- HSC-3 Merlins
- HSC-4 Black Knights
- HSC-6 Indians
- HSC-8 Eightballers
- HSC-14 Chargers
- HSC-21 Blackjacks
- HSC-23 Wildcards
MH-60R Seahawk
- HSM-35 Magicians
- HSM-41 Seahawks
- HSM-49 Scorpions
- HSM-71 Raptors
- HSM-73 BattleCats
- HSM-75 Wolf Pack
- HSM-78 Blue Hawks
C-40A Clipper
- VR-57 Conquistadors
CMV-22B (V22)
- VRM-30 Titans
- VRM-50 Sunhawks

== Ships ==
- USS Carl Vinson (CVN-70)
- USS Theodore Roosevelt (CVN-71)
- USS Abraham Lincoln (CVN-72)
- USS John C. Stennis (CVN-74)
- USS Miguel Keith (ESB-5)

== Tenant commands ==
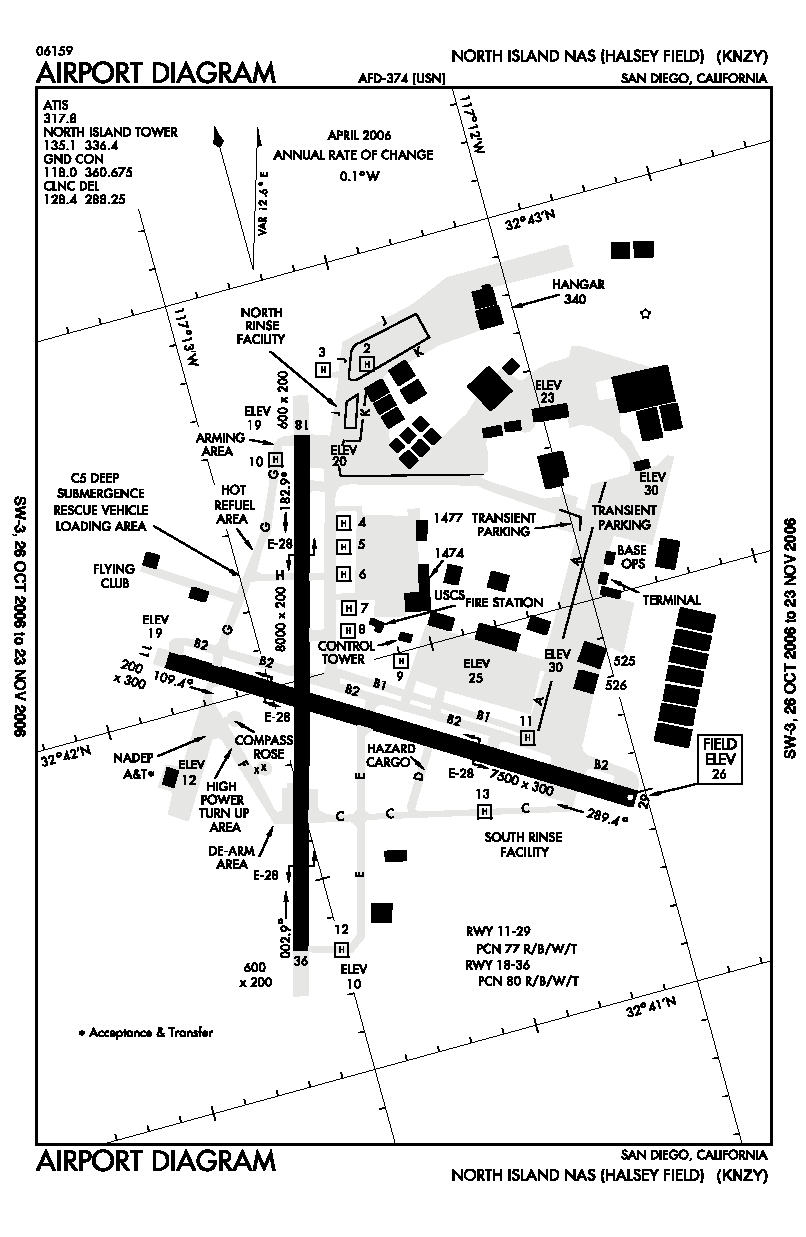
FAA airport diagram

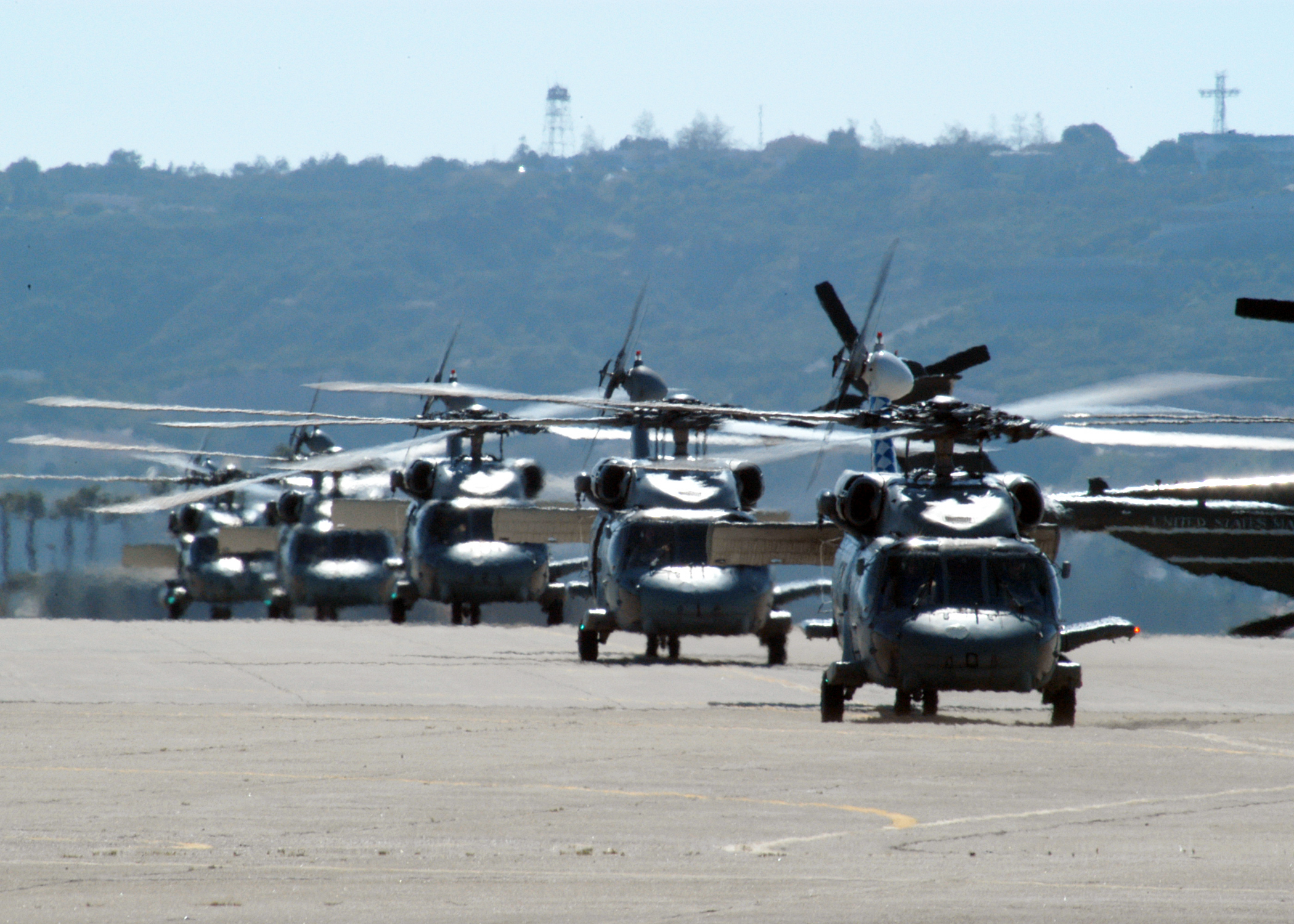
Seahawks at NAS North Island

- Commander, Naval Air Forces
- Commander, Naval Air Forces, Pacific Fleet (COMNAVAIRPAC)
- Commander, Helicopter Maritime Strike WING Pacific (CHSMWP)
- Commander, Helicopter Sea Combat WING Pacific (CHSCWP)
- Commander, Carrier Strike Group One (CCSG-1)
- Commander, Carrier Strike Group Three (CCSG-3)
- Commander, Carrier Strike Group Seven (CCSG-7)
- Commander, Carrier Strike Group Eleven (CCSG-11)
- Commander, Cruiser Destroyer Group One (COMCARDESGRU 1)
- Commander Destroyer Group Seven (COMDESRON 7)
- Commander, Destroyer Squadron Twenty-One (COMDESRON 21)
- Commander, Tactical Air Control Group One (COMTACGRU 1)
- Construction Battalion Unit 405 (CBU 405)
- Deep Submergence Unit (DSU)
- Defense Enterprise Computing Center Det San Diego
- DSU Det Mystic (DSRV 1)
- DSU Diving System Support Detachment
- DSU Unmanned Vehicle Detachment
- Fleet Aviation Specialized Operational Training Group Pacific
- Fleet Imaging Command Pacific
- Fleet Logistics Multi-Mission Wing (VRMW)
- Fleet Readiness Center Southwest
- Fleet Weather Center San Diego
- HSC Weapons School, Pacific
- HSM Weapons School, Pacific
- Naval Air Technical Data and Engineering Service Center (NATEC)
- Naval Computer and Telecommunications Station
- Naval Leader Training Unit, Coronado
- Naval Public Affairs Support Element, West
- Naval Special Clearance Team One
- Center for Naval Aviation Technical Training Unit (CNATTU)
- Naval Information Warfare Training Group, San Diego (formerly NIOC San Diego)
- Navy Reserve Center North Island (formerly Navy Operational Support Center North Island, formerly Naval Air Reserve San Diego)
- Maritime Expeditionary Security Squadron(MSS-3)
- Strike Group Oceanography Team San Diego

== Climate ==
NAS North Island features some of the warmest winter temperatures anywhere on the west coast of the continental United States. Under the Köppen climate classification system, it is classified as a semi-arid climate (BSh or warm steppe).

Climate data for Naval Air Station North Island (1991–2020 normals, extremes 1945–present)
Month	Jan	Feb	Mar	Apr	May	Jun	Jul	Aug	Sep	Oct	Nov	Dec	Year
Record high °F (°C)	89 (32)	91 (33)	92 (33)	90 (32)	90 (32)	94 (34)	94 (34)	95 (35)	101 (38)	101 (38)	99 (37)	88 (31)	101 (38)
Mean daily maximum °F (°C)	66.3 (19.1)	66.3 (19.1)	67.0 (19.4)	68.1 (20.1)	69.3 (20.7)	70.9 (21.6)	74.4 (23.6)	76.7 (24.8)	76.6 (24.8)	74.5 (23.6)	70.5 (21.4)	65.8 (18.8)	70.5 (21.4)
Daily mean °F (°C)	57.6 (14.2)	58.4 (14.7)	60.0 (15.6)	61.8 (16.6)	64.2 (17.9)	66.3 (19.1)	69.7 (20.9)	71.6 (22.0)	70.9 (21.6)	67.3 (19.6)	62.0 (16.7)	57.2 (14.0)	63.9 (17.7)
Mean daily minimum °F (°C)	49.0 (9.4)	50.5 (10.3)	52.9 (11.6)	55.4 (13.0)	59.1 (15.1)	61.7 (16.5)	65.1 (18.4)	66.5 (19.2)	65.1 (18.4)	60.2 (15.7)	53.6 (12.0)	48.5 (9.2)	57.3 (14.1)
Record low °F (°C)	30 (−1)	34 (1)	40 (4)	44 (7)	47 (8)	54 (12)	57 (14)	57 (14)	54 (12)	42 (6)	40 (4)	34 (1)	30 (−1)
Average precipitation inches (mm)	1.67 (42)	1.94 (49)	1.45 (37)	0.64 (16)	0.45 (11)	0.06 (1.5)	0.09 (2.3)	0.02 (0.51)	0.16 (4.1)	0.59 (15)	0.78 (20)	1.48 (38)	9.33 (237)
Average precipitation days (≥ 0.01 in)	7.3	7.5	5.7	3.1	1.7	0.7	0.6	0.4	0.9	2.8	4.1	6.7	41.5
Source: NOAA

== Education ==
The housing on-post is in the Coronado Unified School District, and the zones for Village Elementary School, Coronado Middle School, and Coronado High School.

== Racing ==
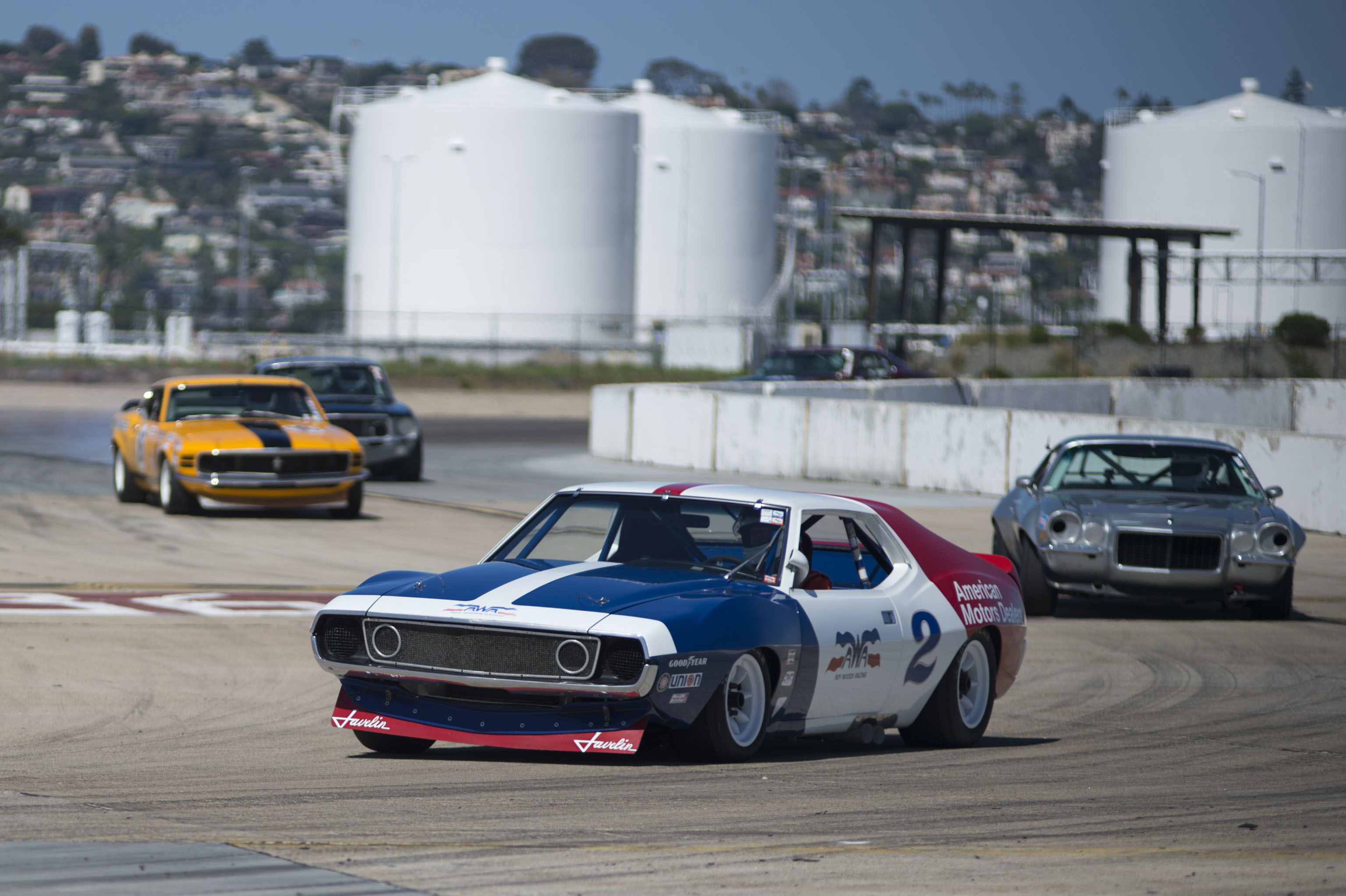
Cars competing in the 2015 Coronado Speed Festival on Runway 36

From 1997 to 2016, the Coronado Speed Festival took place on Runway 36 and the surrounding taxiways. The course initially started as a 1.5-mile (2.4 km) track with seven corners, then was expanded to 1.7 miles (2.7 km) with nine turns. The Global MX-5 Cup and Stadium Super Trucks also participated in the weekend between 2012 and 2014.

In 2026, NASCAR organized a race weekend around NAS North Island. The street circuit spans 3.4 miles (5.5 km) with 19 turns, including going along the carrier dock and by Runway 18/36.

== See also ==
- Naval Air Station
- List of airports in California
- List of United States Navy airfields
