= HSC-23 =

Helicopter Sea Combat Squadron 23
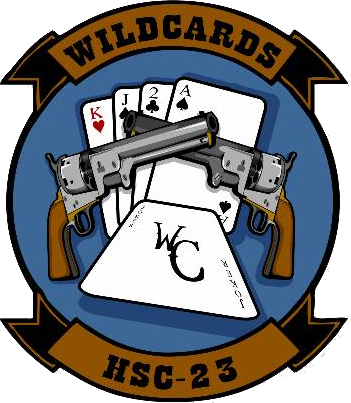
- HSC-23 Wildcards Insignia
- Active: 29 September 2006 – present
- Country: United States of America
- Branch: United States Navy
- Type: US Navy HSC Expeditionary Squadron
- Size: 400+ Personnel
- Garrison/HQ: NAS North Island
- Nickname: "Wildcards"
- Motto: Wildcards Never Fold!
- Colors: Blue, White, Tan

Commanders
- Current commander: Commander Kevin Ringelstein

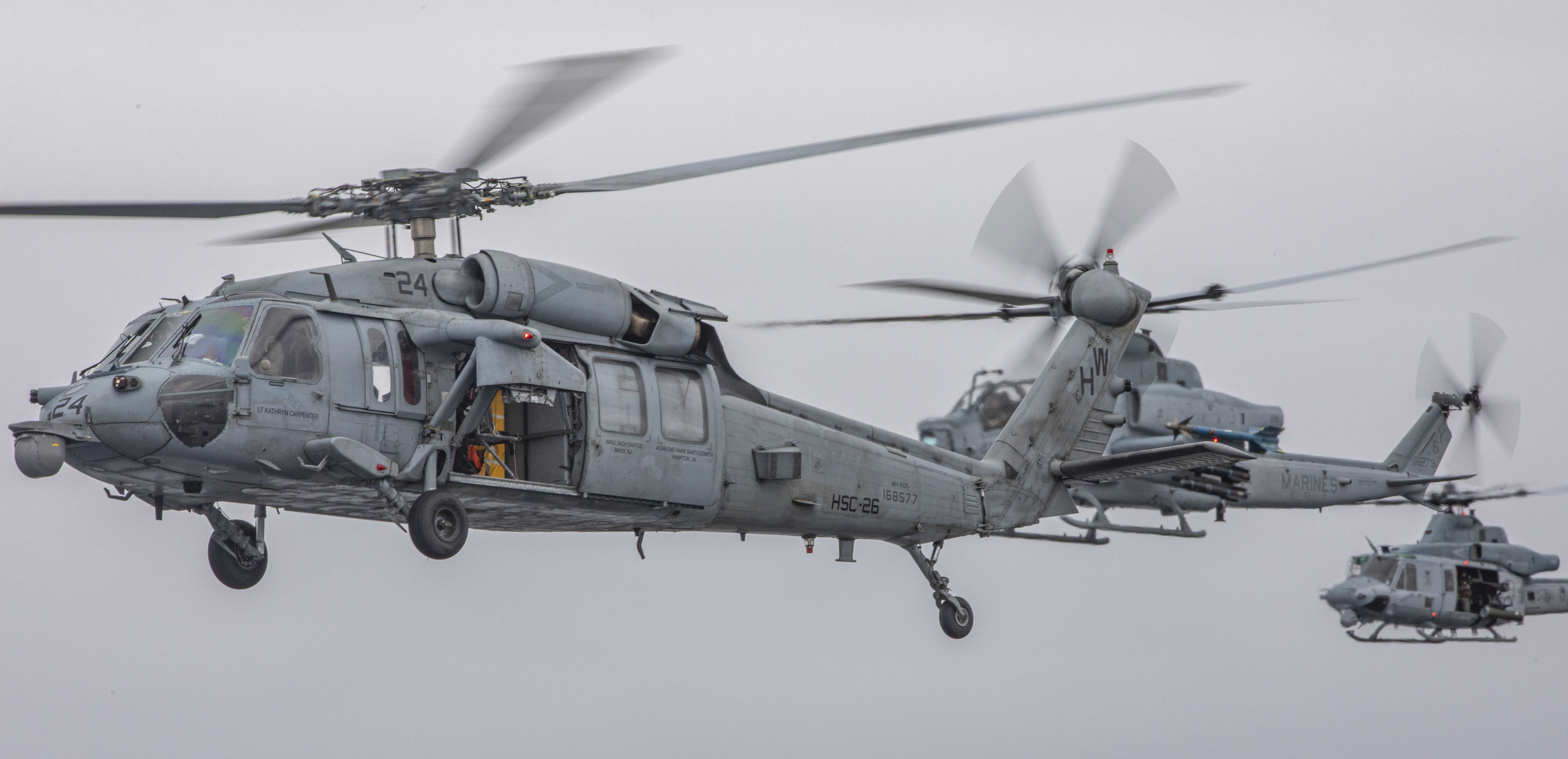
A Seahawk piloted by HSC-23, alongside Marine Medium Tiltrotor Squadron 162

Helicopter Sea Combat Squadron 23 (HSC-23), also known as the "Wildcards", are a United States Navy helicopter squadron based at Naval Air Station North Island in San Diego, California. The "Wildcards" currently fly the MH-60S Seahawk helicopter and the MQ-8C Firescout. HSC-23 is the sister squadron of the HSC-21 "Blackjacks" stationed at Naval Air Station North Island.

== History ==
Helicopter Sea Combat Squadron 23 was established on 29 September 2006 at Naval Air Station North Island in San Diego, California.

On 26 January 2007, a MH-60S assigned to HSC-23 Detachment Three, and underway on USS Bonhomme Richard, crashed while conducting in-flight operations training off the coast of Southern California. The crash of Bullet 10 resulted in the deaths of four crew members:

- LT Adam Dyer, Helicopter Aircraft Commander (HAC);
- LTJG Laura J. Mankey, Pilot;
- AW1 Cory Helman, Search and Rescue (SAR) Aircrew; and,
- AW2 (AW/NAC) Christopher M. Will, SAR Aircrew Chief.

After refueling and retrieving box lunches, Bullet 10 departed the ship. At 1407, Bullet 10 requested and received permission to climb to 1,000 feet for training. At 1414, Bullet 10 reported "ops normal." At 1423:54, Bullet 10's Electronic Locator Transmitter (ELT) sounded. At 1423:56 a "mayday" call was made. During the mayday call, the HAC is overheard telling the crew to "strap in PCL, PCL." At 1424:03, the ELT stopped transmitting. At 1424, Bonhomme Richard reported the crash and sent Bullet 11 to conduct SAR. At 1435, a SAR swimmer successfully recovered the body from the water. The SAR effort would continue for the next 24 hours involving multiple air and waterborne assets, including all Bonhomme Richard ship assets as well as some Coast Guard assets. At 1505, 27 January 2007, the SAR effort was terminated and three missing crewmembers were declared "Lost at Sea."

On 16 February 2007, during salvage operations, the wreckage of Bullet 10 and the remains of the three missing crewmembers were recovered. Subsequent engineering reports revealed that the damage to Bullet 10 is consistent with the aircraft entering the water in a tail-down, right roll altitude with the aircraft having a backward momentum.

At the time of the incident, the weather satisfied the Visual Flight Rules (VFR) conditions. Based on review of training records, all crewmembers had the sufficient training, experience and skill to handle in-flight emergencies related to flight control. Moreover, all crewmembers were cleared of all medical conditions or medications which could have caused this mishap.

=== Artemis II recovery ===
On April 10, 2026, USS John P. Murtha served as the recovery vessel for the Orion spacecraft Integrity and its crew during the Artemis II mission. It carried MH-60S Sea Hawk helicopters from HSC-23.
