= HSM-49 =

Helicopter Maritime Strike Squadron 49 (HSM-49)
- HSM-49 Scorpions insignia
- Founded: March 23, 1990; 36 years ago
- Country: United States
- Branch: United States Navy
- Role: Anti-Submarine Warfare (ASW), Anti-Surface Warfare (ASuW), Search and Rescue (SAR), Vertical Replenishment (VERTREP), Communications Relay (COMREL), and Naval Surface Fire Support (NSFS).
- Part of: COMHSMWINGPAC
- Garrison/HQ: NAS North Island
- Nickname: Scorpions
- Motto: Excellence in all we do.
- Equipment: MH-60R Seahawk (Sikorsky Aircraft)

Helicopter Maritime Strike Squadron 49 (HSM-49) is a United States Navy Maritime Strike helicopter squadron based Naval Air Station North Island, California.

The Scorpions of HSM-49 are an operational fleet squadron based at NAS North Island. Their tailcode is TX and their radio callsign is "Red Stinger". The squadron provides combat-ready pilots, aircrewmen, technicians, and aircraft to Pacific Fleet warships. The squadron operates the MH-60R Seahawk helicopter.

== History ==
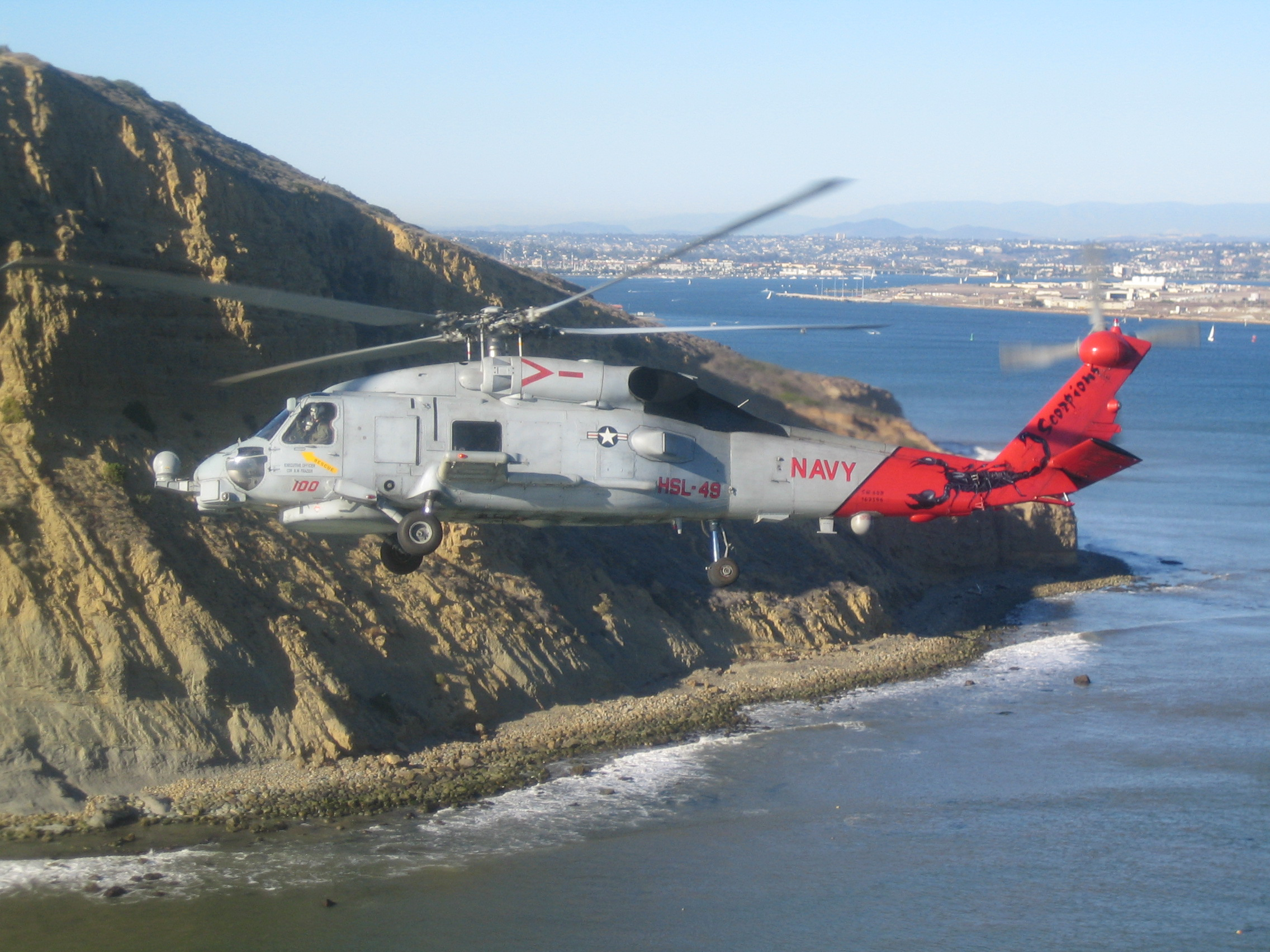
SH-60B Seahawk helicopter from HSL-49 bearing markings making it the "tailbird" near Point Loma, San Diego, California, in 2006.

HSM-49 was redesignated on 1 April 2015, formerly being Helicopter Anti-Submarine Squadron Light 49 (HSL-49). HSL-49 was established on 23 March 1990 as the U.S. Navy transitioned the Helicopter Anti-Submarine Light community from the SH-2 Seasprite to the SH-60B Seahawk. The Scorpions first deployed in November 1990 with Detachment 1 embarked in USS Ford (FFG-54).

The squadron - then and now - deploys its personnel and aircraft in an expeditionary model. Detachments are led by an Officer-in-Charge, normally a Lieutenant Commander, and typically deploy with one or two helicopters, and a complement of pilots, Naval Aircrewmen, mechanics and technicians.

Detachments embark Arleigh Burke class destroyers and Ticonderoga class cruisers in support of Carrier Strike Groups (CSG), Surface Action Groups (SAG), or independent deployed operations. Recent deployed detachments have engaged in missions ranging from Operation Enduring Freedom (OEF), counter-piracy, Humanitarian Assistance and Disaster Relief (HA/DR), and Counter-Illicit Trafficking.

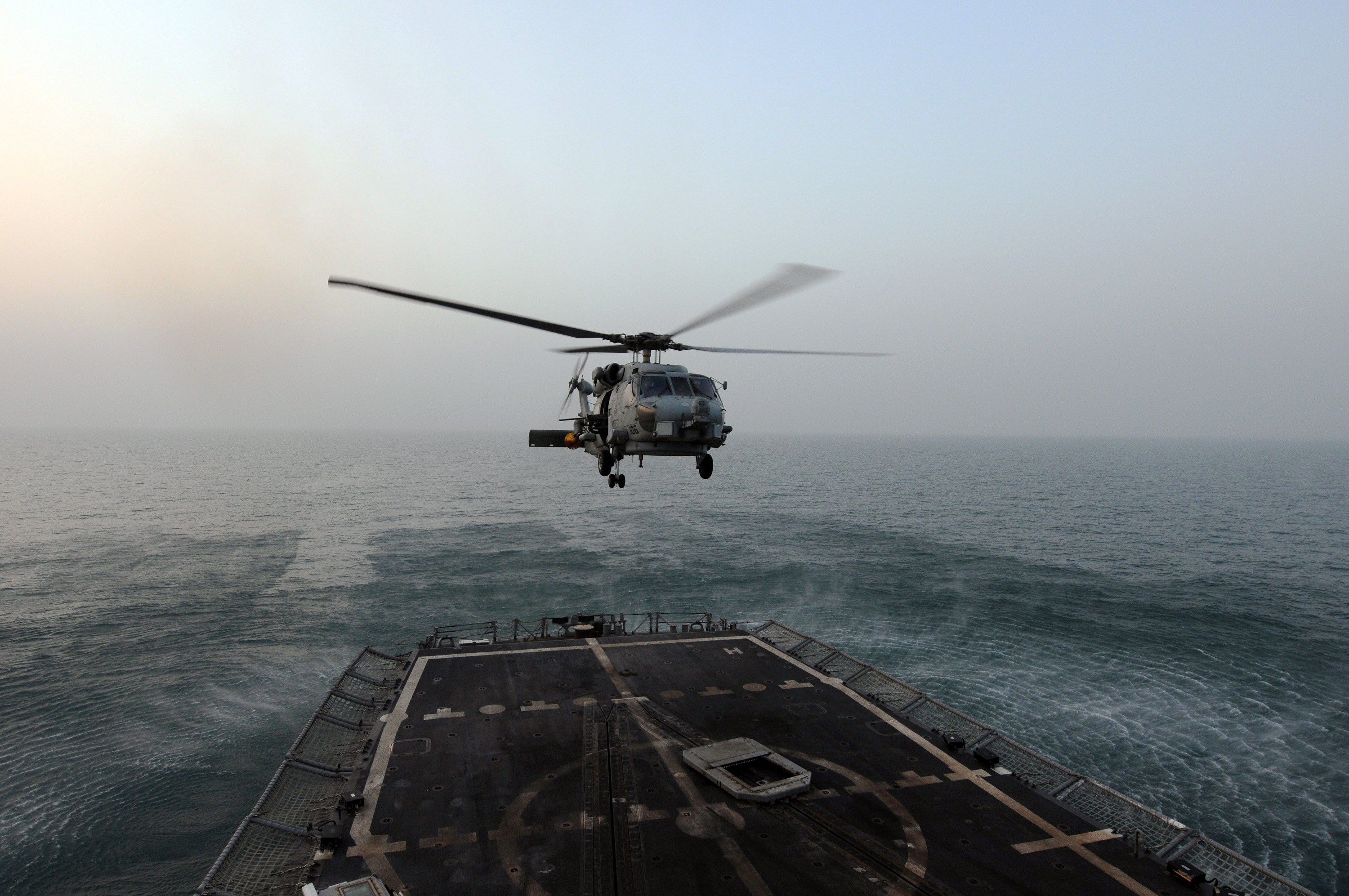
SH-60B Seahawk helicopter lifts from the USS Thach (FFG 43) in 2009.

== Aircraft ==
Crews from HSM-49 operate the MH−60R Seahawk, a helicopter manufactured by Sikorsky Aircraft and equipped with two front-drive T700−GE−401C turboshaft engines manufactured by the General Electric Company. The helicopter has fixed landing gear, an external cargo hook, a rescue hoist, and bomb racks for carrying and launching external stores. In addition, it is equipped with a sonobuoy launch system, a Helicopter In−Flight Refueling (HIFR) system, and the necessary avionics and instrumentation for instrument flight and mission accomplishment. The helicopter can operate from a variety of naval ships.

HSM-49 transitioned from the SH-60B to the MH-60R variant of the Seahawk in the spring of 2015.

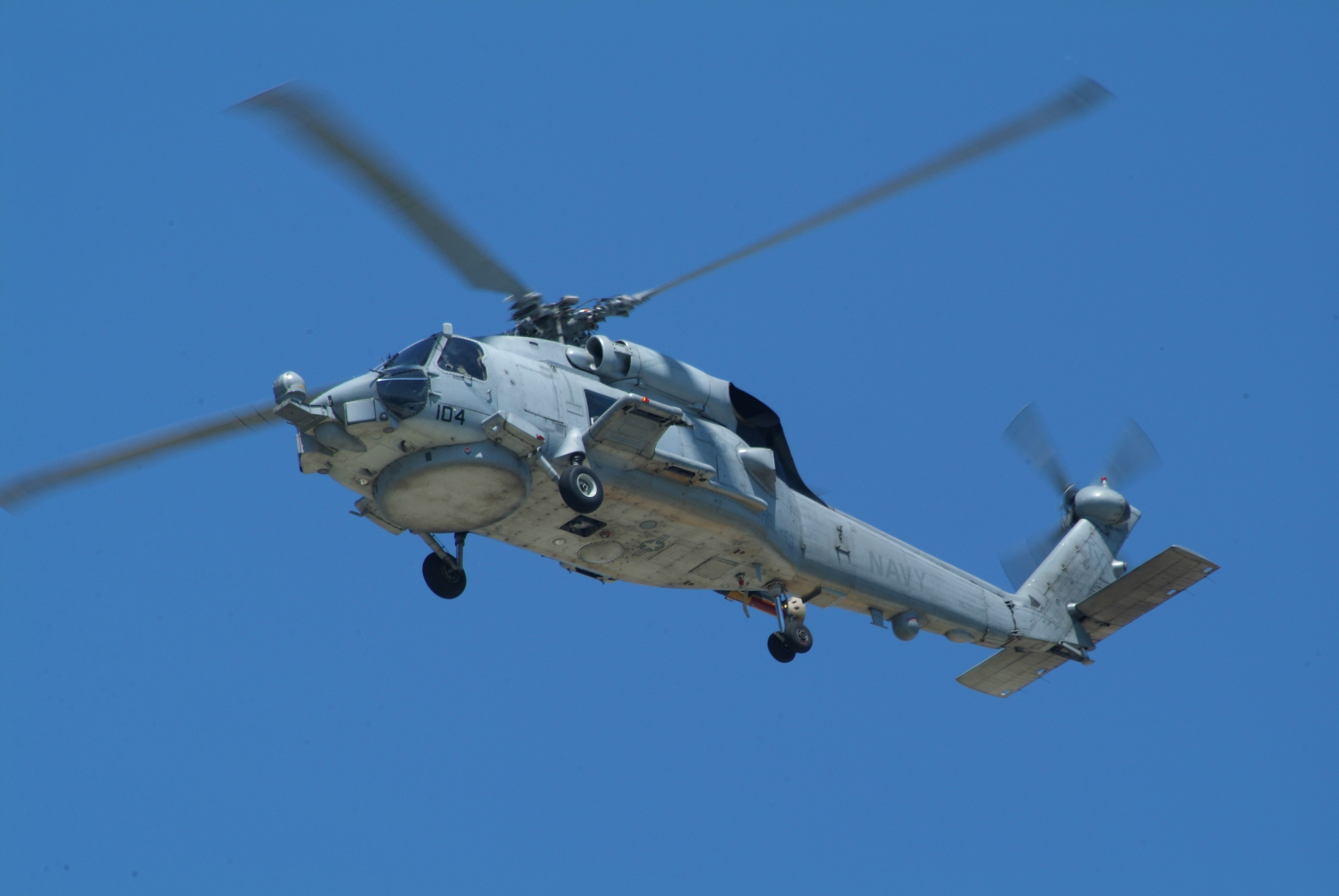
Red Stinger 104 from HSL-49 hovering at NAS North Island in 2009.

== Mission ==
The MH-60R is designed to combine the features of the legacy SH-60B and SH-60F airframes. The aircraft includes an Aircraft Survivability Equipment (ASE) package, FLIR, multi-mode radar/IFF interrogator, airborne fleet data link, and a more advanced airborne active sonar. It is not equipped with the Magnetic Anomaly Detection (MAD) that the SH-60B employed. Pilot instrumentation is provided by a glass cockpit, using digital monitors instead of dials and gauges.

=== Primary Missions ===
In an Anti-Submarine Warfare (ASW) role, Scorpion aircrews use radar, Electronic Support Measures (ESM), sonobuoys, and ship sensors to localize, classify, track, and if necessary, attack when a submarine has been detected. Aircraft can be equipped with various different torpedoes for the mission.

In an Anti-Surface Warfare (ASuW) role, Scorpion aircrews observe, identify, and localize threat platforms using radar, ESM, and FLIR. When a suspected threat is detected, data can be provided to the parent ship for surface−to−surface weapon engagement. Aircraft equipped with Hellfire missiles (AGM-114) may conduct independent or coordinated attacks. The MH-60R can also be equipped with the GAU-21 (.50 caliber) and M240D (7.62 mm) crew served machine guns.

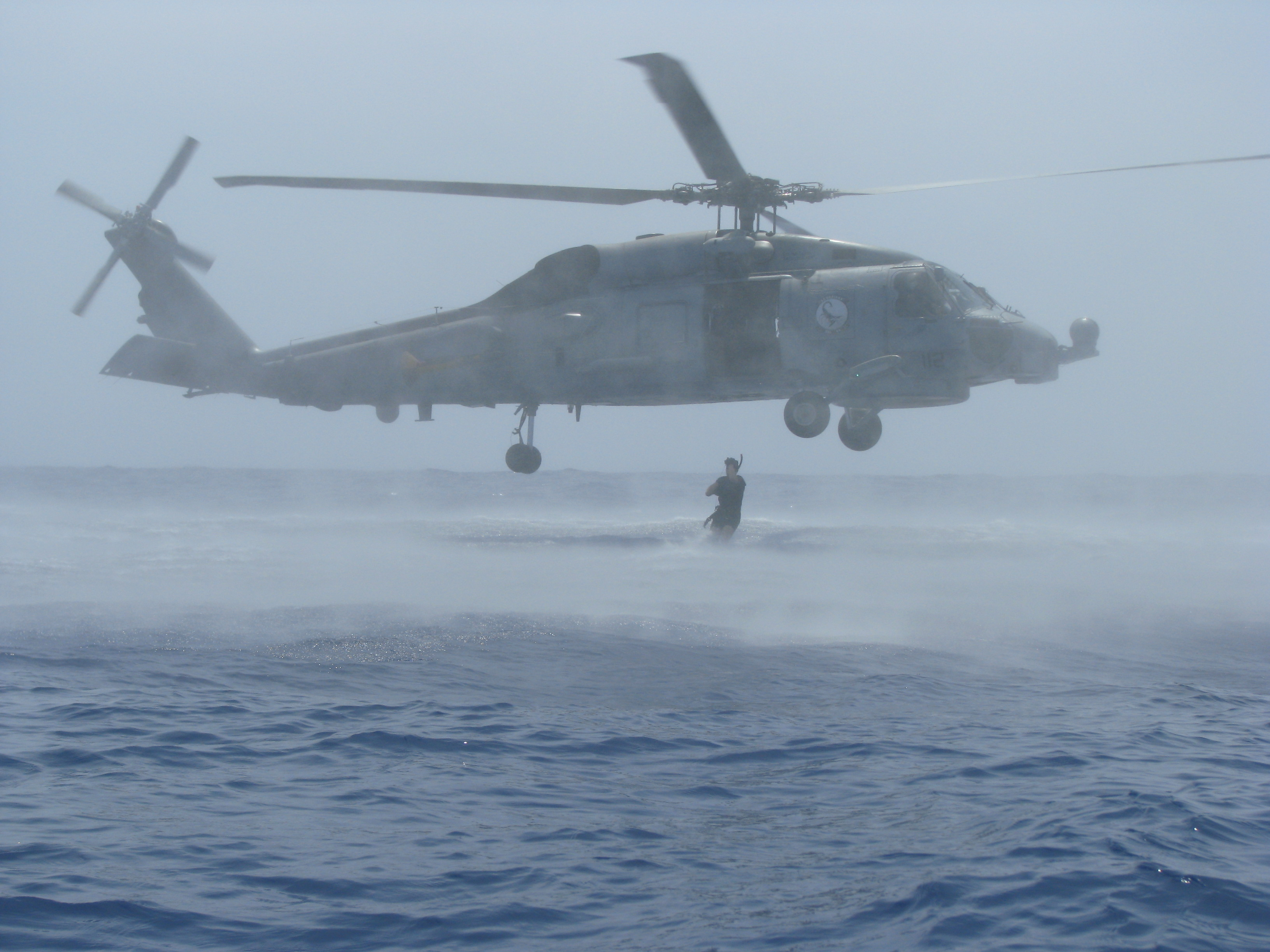
SH-60B Seahawk helicopter from HSL-49 conducting SAR jumps training in the vicinity of Guam in 2008 while embarked in USS Princeton (CG-59).

Other enhanced capabilities include an ASE package, FLIR, multi-mode radar/IFF interrogator, airborne fleet data link, and an advanced airborne active sonar.

=== Secondary Missions ===
Vertical Replenishment - In the VERTREP mission, the aircraft is able to transfer material between ships, or between ship and shore.

Search and Rescue - In the SAR mission, the aircraft is designed to search for and locate a particular target/object/ship or plane and to rescue personnel using the rescue hoist.

Medical Evacuation - In the MEDEVAC mission, the aircraft provides for the medical evacuation of patients.

Communications Relay - In the COMREL mission, the aircraft relays communications between units.

Naval Surface Fire Support - In the NSFS mission, the aircraft provides a platform for spotting and controlling naval gunfire from surface ships.

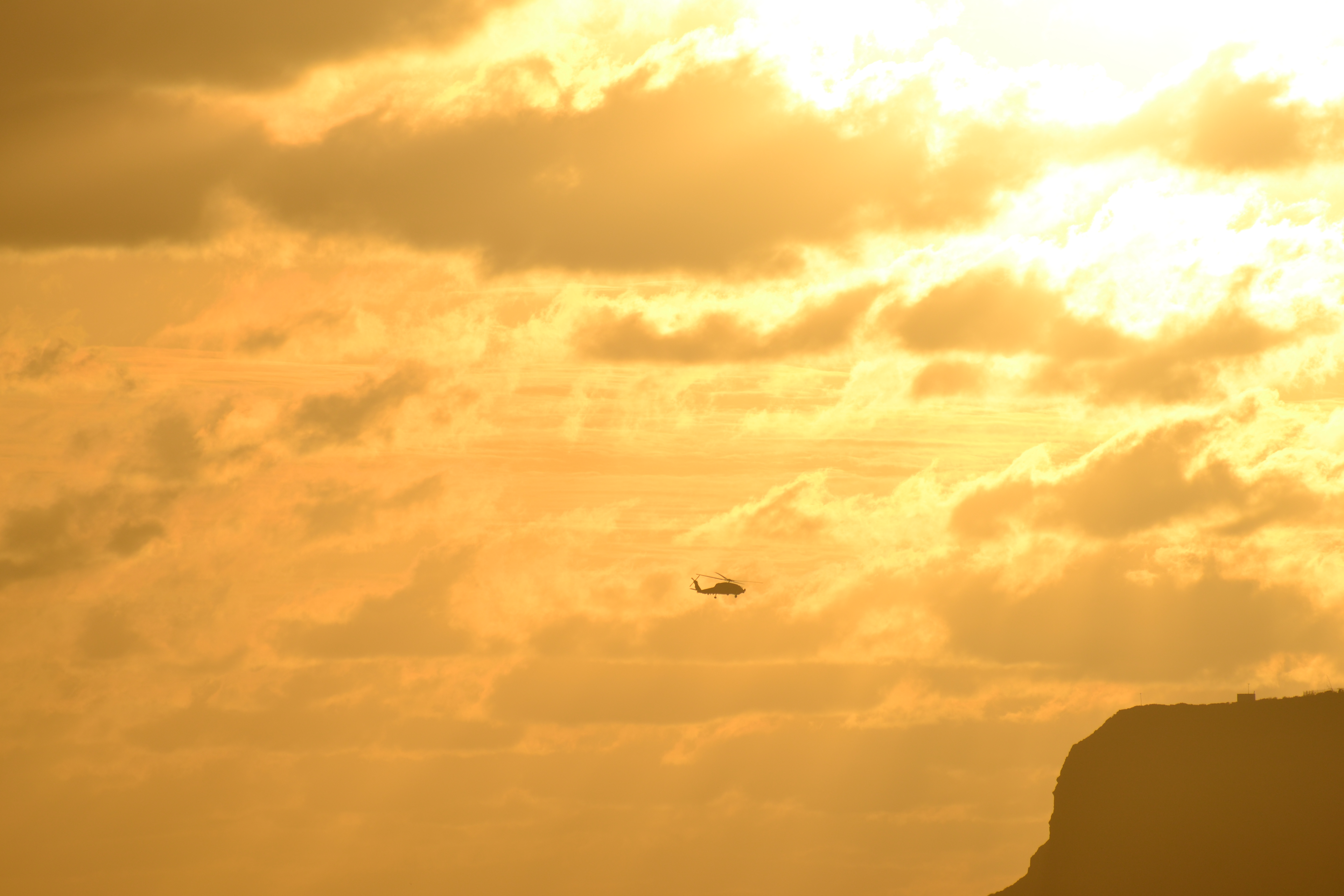
SH-60B Seahawk helicopter from HSL-49 returning to NAS North Island, San Diego, CA in 2014. Point Loma can be seen clearly in the background.

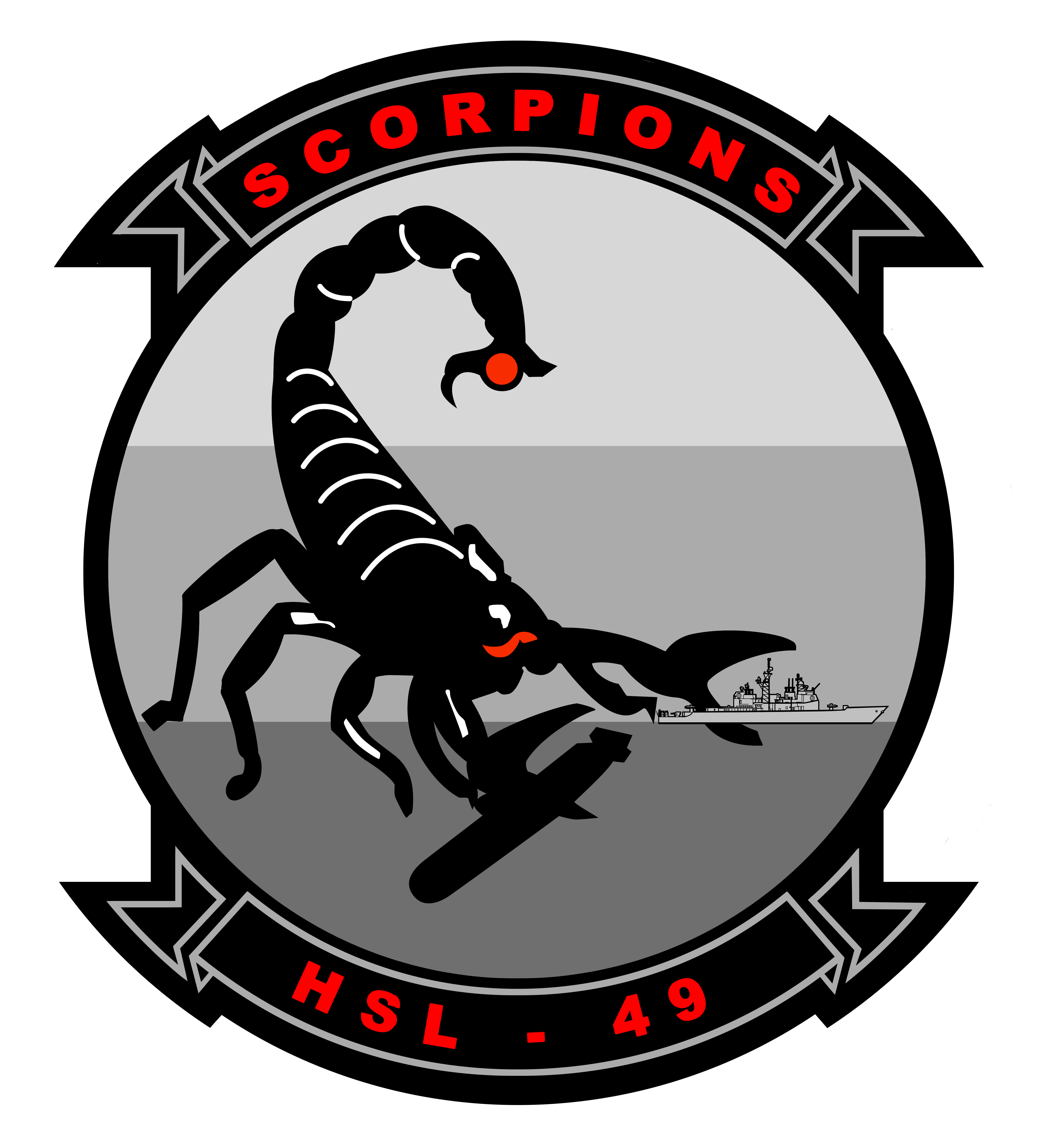
HSL-49 patch from 2002-2015.

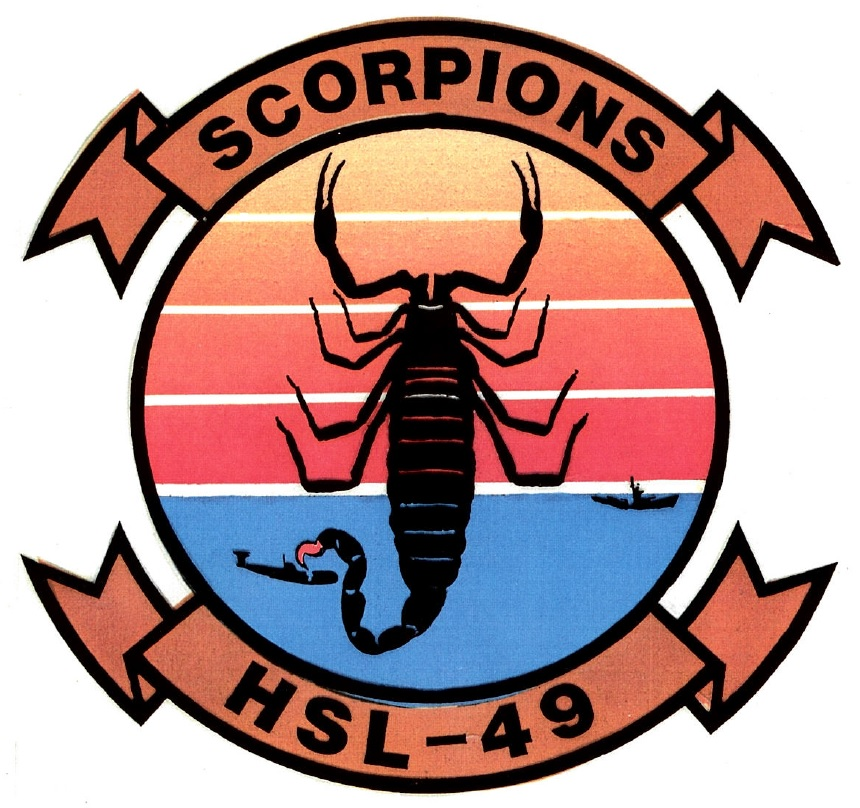
HSL-49 original patch from 1990-2002.

== Unit awards ==
Year	Award
1995	Meritorious Unit Commendation
1995	Sikorsky Award (Most improved maintenance)
1995	COMHSLWINGPAC Top Torpedo Award (Outstanding ASW ordnance precision)
1996	Arnold J. Isbell Trophy (ASW excellence)
1999	CNO Aviation Safety Award
2001	Sikorsky Award
2001	COMHSLWINGPAC Top Torpedo Award
2002	Lockheed Martin COMHSLWINGPAC Maintenance Award
2003	Secretary of Defense Maintenance Award
2004	COMHSLWINGPAC Top Torpedo Award
2004	Sikorsky Aircraft Maintenance Award ("Golden Wrench")
2008	Arnold J. Isbell Trophy
2008	CNO Aviation Safety Award
2009	Department of the Navy Safety Excellence Award
2009	CNO Aviation Safety Award
2009	Navy Unit Commendation
2010	CNO Aviation Safety Award
2011	CNO Aviation Safety Award
2013	Sikorsky Aircraft Maintenance Award ("Golden Wrench")
2013	CNO Aviation Safety Award
2014	Department of the Navy Safety Excellence Award
2014	Sikorsky Aircraft Maintenance Award ("Golden Wrench")
2014	CNO Aviation Safety Award
2015	Meritorious Unit Commendation
2016	Retention Excellence Award
2016	Battle Efficiency (Battle "E")
2017	Sikorsky Aircraft Maintenance Award ("Golden Wrench")
2017	CNO Aviation Safety Award
2018	Sikorsky Aircraft Maintenance Award ("Golden Wrench")

== See also ==
- Naval aviation
- List of United States Navy aircraft designations (pre-1962) / List of US Naval aircraft
- United States Naval Aviator
- List of United States Navy ratings
- Military aviation
- List of United States Navy aircraft squadrons
- List of Inactive United States Navy aircraft squadrons
