= HSM-73 =

US Navy maritime helicopter squadron

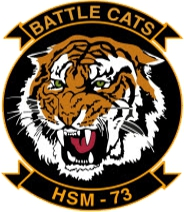
Official logo

Helicopter Maritime Strike Squadron 73 (HSM-73) is a United States Navy Maritime Strike helicopter squadron based on Naval Air Station North Island, California.

HSM-73 is the home of the Battlecats. They fly the MH-60R Seahawk helicopter in a variety of missions and are capable of operating from frigates, destroyers, cruisers, and aircraft carriers.

The BattleCats are led by a trio of leaders, referred to in the Navy as "The Triad". These leaders consist of the Commanding Officer, Executive Officer, and the Command Master Chief. Commander Richard "Speed" Christoff, USN, serves as the Commanding Officer. The Executive Officer is Commander Jameel "Faceman" McDaniel, USN. Command Master Chief Jason Brown, USN, serves as the senior enlisted advisor at the command and as such works as a liaison between the commanding officer and the enlisted ranks.

HSM-73's primary mission is to conduct sea control operations in open ocean and littoral environments as an integral part of a Carrier Air Wing. HSM-73's missions include:

- Anti-Submarine Warfare (ASW)
- Anti-Surface Warfare (ASUW)
- Surveillance
- Communication Relay (COMREL)
- Search and Rescue (SAR)
- Naval Surface Fire Support (NSFS)
- Vertical Replenishment (VERTREP)
- Personnel Transfer

== History ==
HSM-73 was formerly Helicopter Anti-Submarine Squadron Light 43 (HSL-43). HSL-43 was established on 5 October 1984 and was the Navy's first operational Light Airborne Multi-Purpose System (LAMPS) MK III squadron. HSL-43's primary mission was to provide fully mission-capable detachments aboard cruisers, destroyers, and frigates assigned to U.S. Pacific Fleet. Helicopters aboard these detachments were an integral part of the ship's weapon system, extending the ship's under-sea and anti-ship warfare capabilities beyond the horizon. Secondary missions included search and rescue (SAR), medical evacuation (MEDEVAC), vertical replenishment (VERTREP), and communications relay (COMREL).

HSL-43 first deployed in February 1985 and subsequently conducted three to four deployments per year. HSL-43 was the first LAMPS MK III squadron in the Navy to demonstrate direct operational support of a Marine Expeditionary Unit (MEU) and its parent Amphibious Readiness Group. HSL-43 was also the first LAMPS squadron in the Navy to field a Night Vision Goggle (NVG) capable detachment, resulting in an increase in safety, mission effectiveness, and aircrew situational awareness.

== Aircraft ==
Crews from HSM-73 operate the MH-60R Seahawk, also referred to as the "Romeo." The MH-60R is the Navy's primary maritime dominance helicopter, replacing the SH-60B and SH-60F aircraft. The MH-60R helicopter features capability as an airborne multi-mission naval platform. The MH-60R Seahawk is manufactured by Sikorsky Aircraft and is the U.S. Navy's primary anti-submarine warfare and anti-surface weapon system for open ocean and littoral zones. It is the world's most advanced maritime helicopter, and is the most capable naval helicopter available today, designed to operate from frigates, destroyers, cruisers, and aircraft carriers. It replaces the SH-60B and SH-60F helicopters in the U.S. Navy's fleet. The MH-60R helicopter features a glass cockpit and significant mission system improvements, which give it capability as an airborne multi-mission naval platform. These improvements include:

- Upgraded mission and flight displays
- Improved Advanced Flight Control Computer (AFCC)
- Integrated Self Defense Suite
- Upgraded Sensors including: Electronic Support Measures (ESM), Airborne Low Frequency Sonar (ALFS), Multi-mission Radar Upgrade (including ISAR), Forward Looking Infrared (FLIR)
- A weapons suite including torpedoes and HELLFIRE missiles

== Mission ==
=== Primary missions ===
Anti-submarine warfare (ASW) is one of the primary missions of HSM-73. Battlecat aircrews utilize the MH-60R's RADAR, Electronic Support Measures (ESM), sonobuoys, and ship sensors to localize, classify, track, and if necessary, attack when a submarine has been detected. Aircraft can be equipped with various types of torpedoes for this mission.

Anti-Surface Warfare (ASUW) is another primary mission of HSM-73. Battlecat aircrews observe, identify, and localize surface threats using RADAR, ESM, and FLIR. When a suspected threat is detected, an MH-60R aircraft equipped with Hellfire missiles may conduct independent or coordinated attacks.

=== Secondary missions ===
Vertical Replenishment - The MH-60R aircraft is able to transfer material between ships, or between ship and shore.

Search and Rescue - The MH-60R aircraft is capable of searching and locating a particular target, object, ship, or aircraft and rescue personnel using the rescue hoist.

Medical Evacuation - The MH-60R aircraft is capable of providing medical evacuation of patients.

Communications Relay - The MH-60R aircraft is capable of relaying communications between units.

Naval Surface Fire Support - The MH-60R may serve as a platform for spotting and controlling naval gunfire from surface ships.
