= HSC-21 =

Helicopter Sea Combat Squadron 21
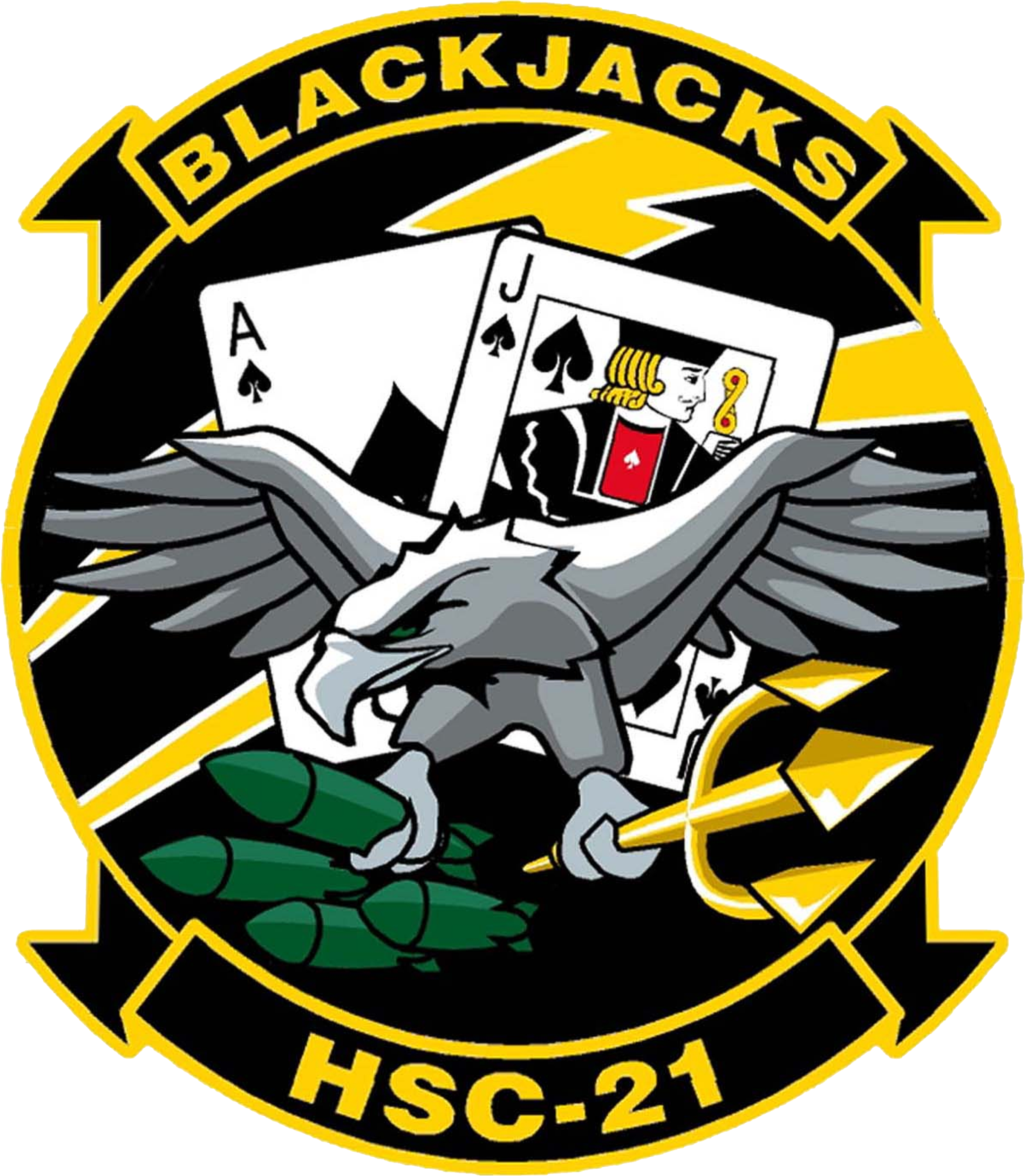
- HSC-21 Blackjacks Insignia
- Active: 1977–present
- Country: United States of America
- Branch: United States Navy
- Role: Search and Rescue (SAR); Logistical Support; Naval Special Warfare (NSW); Anti-Surface Warfare (ASUW); Vertical Replenishment (VERTREP); Medical Evacuation (MEDEVAC)
- Garrison/HQ: Naval Air Station North Island
- Nickname: Blackjacks

Commanders
- Current commander: CDR Dave Ayotte (Sep 2018 – present)
- Notable commanders: CDR Anthony Saunders(AUG 2011-DEC 2012); CDR Greg Leland (DEC 2012-OCT 2013); CDR Jack Reardon (OCT 2013-Feb 2015)

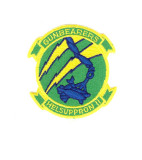
Squadron insignia during the period of designation as HC-11

Helicopter Sea Combat Squadron 21 (HSC-21), nicknamed "Blackjacks", is an aviation unit of the United States Navy based at Naval Air Station North Island. HSC-21 is made up of five expeditionary detachments that deploy aboard ships including Combat Logistics Force support ships, Hospital Ships and Amphibious Assault ships, among others. HSC-21 flies the Sikorsky MH-60S Seahawk helicopter.

== History ==
HSC-21 was established as Helicopter Combat Support Squadron 11 (HC-11) "Gunbearers" on 1 October 1977 at Naval Air Station North Island, San Diego, California, to provide logistics support for the units of the United States Pacific Fleet. In April 2005, HC-11 was redesignated HSC-21 "Blackjacks". During Operation Iraqi Freedom HSC-21 had shore base detachment as a part of the 2515th Naval Air Ambulance Detachment, Udari Army Airfield, Kuwait. This detachment closed in Fall 2012.

== See also ==
- History of the United States Navy
- List of United States Navy aircraft squadrons
