= List of inactive United States Navy helicopter squadrons =

Twenty-eight of the seventy-nine United States Navy helicopter squadrons which have ever been established no longer exist having been disestablished. Eleven squadrons exist in an "inactive" status for possible future reactivation and forty are currently active.

These disestablished and deactivated squadrons are sometimes incorrectly referred to as decommissioned squadrons, but the U.S. Navy does not "commission" or "decommission" aircraft squadrons. Until 1998, squadrons were "established", "disestablished", and sometimes "redesignated"; since 1998, squadrons are "established", "deactivated", and sometimes "reactivated" and/or "redesignated". It has never been correct to refer to U.S. Navy aircraft squadrons as being commissioned and decommissioned, ships are commissioned and decommissioned, U.S. Navy aircraft squadrons are not.

Under the system in use until 1998, a squadron's history and lineage began when it was established and ended when it was disestablished. During the course of its existence (between establishment and disestablishment) a squadron could be redesignated multiple times. The Navy's oldest currently active aircraft squadron is VFA-14 "Tophatters". It was established in September 1919 and has carried sixteen different designations (VT-5, VP-1-4, VF-4, VB-3, VS-41, VA-14, VF-14, VFA-14 to name just a few) having been redesignated fifteen times. Re-designation might assign a squadron a new basic designation while leaving the number untouched (e.g., HU-1 to HC-1), or it could change the entire designation (e.g., HS-3 to HSC-9). A Squadron retains its lineage regardless of its redesignation(s). When a squadron was disestablished or redesignated its former designation became available to be used for a new squadron or in the redesignation of an existing squadron. Squadrons which share a designation do not also share a lineage as a squadron's lineage follows the squadron, not the designation. A squadron which received the designation of a former squadron might adopt the nickname and/or the insignia and carry on the traditions of the previous squadron, but it could not lay claim to the history or lineage of that previous squadron any more than a new ship commissioned with the name USS Enterprise could claim to be the actual WWII aircraft carrier USS Enterprise.

This system changed in March 1998 with Chief of Naval Operations Instruction (OPNAVINST) 5030.4E. U.S. Navy aircraft squadrons are now no longer disestablished, they are instead "deactivated." A deactivated squadron remains in existence, though only "on paper", awaiting possible future "reactivation". Neither its designation nor any previous designations are available for use by a new squadron. A reactivated squadron would trace its lineage back to the squadron's original establishment date, including its inactive period. Under this new system a squadron can still be redesignated if its function changes necessitating a different designation, for example Helicopter Antisubmarine Squadron EIGHT (HS-8) was redesignated as a Sea Combat Squadron; Helicopter Sea Combat Squadron EIGHT (HSC-8)

The current update of OPNAVINST 3050.4 contains a list of all currently active and deactivated U.S. Navy aircraft squadrons.

The sections of this article list disestablished and deactivated squadrons but also listed will be the former no longer used designations of squadrons which are still active under their current designation.

== Antisubmarine (HS) squadrons ==
The HS designation was created in 1951 to designate Helicopter Antisubmarine squadron and remained in use until the last active HS squadron was redesignated as a Helicopter Sea Combat (HSC) squadron on 1 June 2016. The designation has not been in active use since. HS squadrons were the second type of helicopter squadron to be established, the first being Helicopter Utility (HU) squadrons. HS squadrons were established to combat the emerging Soviet submarine threat and were equipped with early sonar technologies. They initially deployed aboard remaining WWII escort carriers hunting soviet submarines in the decade of the 1950s. In 1960 the Navy paired them with Air Antisubmarine (VS) squadrons forming Antisubmarine Carrier Air Groups (CVSG) aboard WWII Essex-class aircraft carriers converted to Antisubmarine Carriers (CVS). The CVSs were decommissioned and their CVSGs disestablished by the mid-1970s and HS squadrons (along with the VS squadrons) were added to Carrier Air Wings.

HS designations were numbered sequentially beginning with HS-1 with odd numbers designating Atlantic Fleet squadrons and even numbers designating Pacific Fleet squadrons (the opposite of the HC and the HSL designation scheme). There were also four Navy Reserve HS squadrons which were numbered in accordance with the Reserve Antisubmarine Carrier Air Groups (CVSGR) for which they were established (HS-74 and HS-75 in CVSGR-70, and HS-84 and HS-85 in CVSGR-80). The USNR squadrons are listed in the "U. S. Navy Reserve Squadrons" section at the end of the article.

There are nine disestablished squadrons and two deactivated squadrons listed below. There are also nine entries listing former designations of currently active squadrons.

Note: The parenthetical (1st) and (2nd) appended to some designations in the tables below are not a part of the squadron designation system. They are added to indicate that the designation was used more than once during the history of U.S. Naval Aviation and which use of the designation is indicated. Absence indicates that the designation was used only once.

Helicopter Antisubmarine Squadron ONE:
Established on 3 October 1951. It was the third U.S. Navy helicopter squadron to be established and the first antisubmarine squadron and as such was heavily involved in the development of equipment, tactics and procedures for the helicopter's use. Later operated as the Atlantic Fleet HS FRS. Disestablished on 30 June 1997.

Designation	Insignia	Nickname	Aircraft	Squadron Lineage	Disestablished
HS-1		Seahorses	HUP, HTL, TBM, HRS, HO4S, SNB, HSS-1, HSS-1N/SH-34J, HSS-2/SH-3A, VH-3A, HH-3A, SH-3D, SH-3G, SH-3H, SH-60F	HS-1: 3 Oct 1951 – 30 Jun 1997	30 June 1997

Helicopter Antisubmarine Squadron TWO:
Established on 7 March 1952. Oldest currently active operational U.S. Navy helicopter squadron. Operated as a Pacific Fleet aircraft carrier based squadron. Redesignated Helicopter Sea Combat Squadron TWELVE (HSC-12) on 6 August 2009. Remains active as HSC-12.

Designation	Insignia	Nickname	Aircraft	Squadron Lineage	Current Designation
HS-2		Golden Falcons	HO4S, HSS-1, HSS-1N, HSS-2/SH-3A, SH-3D, SH-3H, SH-60F, HH-60H	HS-2: 7 Mar 1952 – 6 Aug 2009; HSC-12: 6 Aug 2009–present	HSC-12

Helicopter Antisubmarine Squadron THREE:
Established on 18 June 1952. Operated as an Atlantic Fleet aircraft carrier based squadron. Redesignated Helicopter Sea Combat Squadron NINE (HSC-9) on 1 June 2009. Remains active as HSC-9.

Designation	Insignia	Nickname	Aircraft	Squadron Lineage	Current Designation
HS-3		Tridents	HUP, HO4S, HSS-1, HSS-1N, HSS-2/SH-3A, SH-3D, SH-3H, SH-60F, HH-60H	HS-3: 18 Jun 1952 – 1 Jun 2009; HSC-9: 1 Jun 2009–present	HSC-9

Helicopter Antisubmarine Squadron FOUR:
Established on 30 June 1952. Operated as a Pacific Fleet aircraft carrier based squadron. Redesignated Helicopter Sea Combat Squadron FOUR (HSC-4) on 29 Mar 2012. Remains active as HSC-4.

Designation	Insignia	Nickname	Aircraft	Squadron Lineage	Current Designation
HS-4		Black Knights	HO4S, HSS-1, HSS-1N/SH-34J, SH-3A, SH-3D, HS-3H, SH-60F, HH-60H	HS-4: 30 Jun 1952 – 29 Mar 2012; HSC-4: 29 Mar 2012–present	HSC-4

Helicopter Antisubmarine Squadron FIVE:
Established on 3 January 1956. Operated as an Atlantic Fleet aircraft carrier based squadron. Redesignated Helicopter Sea Combat Squadron FIVE (HSC-5) on 29 Mar 2012. Remains active as HSC-5.

Designation	Insignia	Nickname	Aircraft	Squadron Lineage	Current Designation
HS-5		Night Dippers	HSS-1N/SH-34J, SH-3A, SH-3D, SH-3H, SH-60F, HH-60H	HS-5: 3 Jan 1956 – 24 Jan 2014; HSC-5: 24 Jan 2014–present	HSC-5

Helicopter Antisubmarine Squadron SIX:
Established on 1 June 1956. Operated as a Pacific Fleet aircraft carrier based squadron. Redesignated Helicopter Sea Combat Squadron SIX (HSC-6) on 8 July 2011. Remains active as HSC-6.

Designation	Insignia	Nickname	Aircraft	Squadron Lineage	Current Designation
HS-6		Indians	HO4S, HSS-1N, HSS-2/SH-3A, SH-3D, SH-3H, SH-60F, HH-60H	HS-6: 1 Jun 1956 – 8 Jul 2011; HSC-6: 8 Jul 2011–present	HSC-6

Helicopter Antisubmarine Squadron SEVEN(1st):
Established as HS-7 (first use of the designation) on 2 April 1956. Established at Naval Air Station Norfolk, Virginia for the purpose of harbor defense. In 1960 the squadron was assigned as an aircraft carrier based squadron. It was disestablished on 31 May 1966.

Designation	Insignia	Nickname	Aircraft	Squadron Lineage	Disestablished
HS-7 (first use)		Big Dippers	HSS-1, HSS-1N/SH-34J	HS-7(1st): 2 Apr 1956 – 31 May 1966	31 May 1966

Helicopter Antisubmarine Squadron SEVEN(2nd):
Established as HS-7 (second use of the designation) on 15 December 1969 adopting the name and insignia of the disestablished HS-7(1st). Operated as an Atlantic Fleet aircraft carrier based squadron. Redesignated Helicopter Sea Combat Squadron SEVEN (HSC-7) on 15 April 2011. Remains active as HSC-7.

Designation	Insignia	Nickname	Aircraft	Squadron Lineage	Current Designation
HS-7 (second use)	(1969) (1995)	Big Dippers (1969); Shamrocks (1973); Dusty Dogs (1995)	SH-3D, SH-3H, SH-60F, HH-60H	HS-7(2nd): 15 Dec 1969 – 15 Apr 2011; HSC-7: 15 Apr 2011–present	HSC-7

Helicopter Antisubmarine Squadron EIGHT(1st):
Established as HS-8 (first use of the designation) on 1 June 1956. Operated as a Pacific Fleet aircraft carrier based squadron. It was disestablished on 31 December 1968.

Designation	Insignia	Nickname	Aircraft	Squadron Lineage	Disestablished
HS-8 (first use)		Eightballers	HSS-1N/SH-34J, SH-3A	HS-8 (1st): 1 Jun 1956 – 31 Dec 1968	31 December 1968

Helicopter Antisubmarine Squadron EIGHT(2nd):
Established as HS-8 (second use of the designation) on 1 November 1969 adopting the name and insignia of the disestablished HS-8(1st). Operated as a Pacific Fleet aircraft carrier based squadron. Redesignated Helicopter Sea Combat Squadron EIGHT (HSC-8) on 28 September 2007. Remains active as HSC-8.

Designation	Insignia	Nickname	Aircraft	Squadron Lineage	Current Designation
HS-8 (second use)		Eightballers	SH-3D, SH-3H, SH-60F, HH-60H	HS-8 (2nd): 1 Nov 1969 – 28 Sep 2007; HSC-8: 28 Sep 2007–present	HSC-8

Helicopter Antisubmarine Squadron NINE(1st):
Established as HS-9 (first use of the designation) on 1 June 1956. Operated as an Atlantic Fleet aircraft carrier based squadron. It was disestablished on 1 October 1968.

Designation	Insignia	Nickname	Aircraft	Squadron Lineage	Disestablished
HS-9 (first use)		Sea Griffins	HSS-1N/SH-34J, SH-3A	HS-9(1st): 1 June 1956 – 1 Oct 1968	1 October 1968

Helicopter Antisubmarine Squadron NINE(2nd):
Established as HS-9 (second use of the designation) on 4 June 1976 adopting the name and insignia of the disestablished HS-9(1st). Operated as an Atlantic Fleet aircraft carrier based squadron. Disestablished on 30 April 1993.

Designation	Insignia	Nickname	Aircraft	Squadron Lineage	Disestablished
HS-9 (second use)		Sea Griffins	SH-3H, SH-60F, HH-60H	HS-9(2nd): 4 Jun 1976 – 30 Apr 1993	30 April 1993

Helicopter Antisubmarine Squadron TEN:
Established on 1 July 1960. Operated as the Pacific Fleet FRS. Deactivated on 12 July 2012.

Designation	Insignia	Nickname	Aircraft	Squadron Lineage	Deactivated
HS-10		Task Masters, War Hawks (1990s)	HSS-1N, HSS-2/SH-3A, SH-3D, SH-3G, SH-3H, SH-60F	HS-10: 1 July 1960 – 12 July 2012	12 July 2012

Helicopter Antisubmarine Squadron ELEVEN:
Established on 27 June 1957. Operated as an Atlantic Fleet aircraft carrier based squadron. Redesignated Helicopter Sea Combat Squadron ELEVEN (HSC-11) on 1 June 2016. Remains active as HSC-11.

Designation	Insignia	Nickname	Aircraft	Squadron Lineage	Current Designation
HS-11		Dragon Slayers	HSS-1, HSS-1N, SH-3D, SH-3H, SH-60F, HH-60H	HS-11: 27 Jun 1957 – 1 Jun 2016; HSC-11: 1 Jun 2016–present	HSC-11

Helicopter Antisubmarine Squadron TWELVE:
Established on 15 July 1977. Operated as a Pacific Fleet aircraft carrier based squadron. Disestablished on 30 November 1994.

Designation	Insignia	Nickname	Aircraft	Squadron Lineage	Disestablished
HS-12		Wyverns	SH-3H	HS-12: 15 Jul 1977 – 30 Nov 1994	30 November 1994

Helicopter Antisubmarine Squadron THIRTEEN:
Established on 25 September 1961 in anticipation of the stand up of Antisubmarine Carrier Air Group SIXTY-TWO's establishment. The group's establishment was cancelled and the squadron was disestablished on 1 October 1962.

Designation	Insignia	Nickname	Aircraft	Squadron Lineage	Disestablished
HS-13		Sub Choppers	HSS-1, HSS-1N/SH-34J	HS-13: 25 Sep 1961-1 Oct 1962	1 October 1962

Helicopter Antisubmarine Squadron FOURTEEN:
Established on 10 July 1984. Operated as a Pacific Fleet aircraft carrier based squadron. Redesignated Helicopter Sea Combat Squadron FOURTEEN (HSC-14) in July 2013. Remains active as HSC-14.

Designation	Insignia	Nickname	Aircraft	Squadron Lineage	Current Designation
HS-14		Chargers	SH-3H, SH-60F, HH-60H	HS-14: 10 Jul 1984-Jul 2013; HSC-14: Jul 2013–present	HSC-14

Helicopter Antisubmarine Squadron / Helicopter Sea Combat Squadron FIFTEEN:
Established as Helicopter Antisubmarine Squadron FIFTEEN (HS-15) on 29 October 1971 to participate in Sea Control Ship experimentation aboard USS Guam from January 1972 to mid 1974 after which it operated as an Atlantic Fleet aircraft carrier based squadron. Redesignated Helicopter Sea Combat Squadron FIFTEEN (HSC-15) in November 2012 continuing as an aircraft carrier based squadron. The squadron was deactivated on 31 March 2017

Designation	Insignia	Nickname	Aircraft	Squadron Lineage	Deactivated
HS-15		Red Lions	SH-3G, SH-3H, SH-60F, HH-60H	HS-15: 29 October 1971-Nov 2102	
HSC-15		Red Lions	MH-60S	HSC-15: Nov 2012-31 Mar 2017	31 March 2017

Helicopter Antisubmarine Squadron SIXTEEN:
Established on 10 March 1987 as part of the establishment of CVW-10(2nd). The wing and its squadrons were disestablished in June 1988 before becoming fully operational.

Designation	Insignia	Nickname	Aircraft	Squadron Lineage	Disestablished
HS-16		Nighthawks	SH-3H	HS-16: 10 March 1987 – 1 Jun 1988	1 June 1988

Helicopter Antisubmarine Squadron SEVENTEEN:
Established on 4 April 1984. Operated as an Atlantic Fleet aircraft carrier based squadron. Disestablished on 30 June 1991.

Designation	Insignia	Nickname	Aircraft	Squadron Lineage	Disestablished
HS-17		Neptune's Raiders	SH-3H	HS-17: 4 April 1984 – 30 Jun 1991	30 June 1991

== Antisubmarine (Light) (HSL) squadrons ==
The Helicopter Antisubmarine (Light) Squadron (HSL) designation was created in 1972 to designate antisubmarine squadrons which operated the Kaman SH-2 Seasprite helicopter as the aircraft component of the aircraft/ship Light Airborne Multi-Purpose System (LAMPS Mk I) in detachments aboard surface force ships to extend those ships' sensor and weapons ranges.

HSL designations began with HSL-30 and squadrons were numbered sequentially with even numbers assigned to Atlantic Fleet squadrons and odd numbers to Pacific Fleet squadrons which was in line with the HC numbering system but the opposite of the HS numbering system. In the mid-1980s the Navy began replacing the LAMPS MK I system H-2 helicopters with LAMPS Mk III system Sikorsky SH-60B Seahawk helicopters. New HSL squadrons established to operate them were designated beginning with HSL-40 and continued the even Atlantic and odd Pacific scheme in the 40 series. There were also three USNR squadrons designated HSL-74, HSL-84 and HSL-94 which operated between 1984 and 2001 and an additional Navy Reserve HSL squadron designated HSL-60 which was established in 2001. Those USNR squadrons are listed in the "U. S. Navy Reserve Squadrons" section at the end of the article.

The designation was discontinued in active use in July 2015 when the last HSL squadron was redesignated a Helicopter Maritime Strike (HSM) squadron. The designation currently exists only attached to two deactivated Navy Reserve HSL squadrons which were both deactivated in 2001.

There are seven disestablished squadrons listed below. There are also twelve entries listing former designations of currently active squadrons.

Helicopter Utility Squadron FOUR / Helicopter Combat Support Squadron FOUR(1st) / Helicopter Antisubmarine (Light) Squadron THIRTY :
Established as HU-4 from a detachment of HU-2 on 1 July 1960 and redesignated HC-4 (first use of the designation) on 4 July 1965. Provided utility and logistics helicopter detachments for the Atlantic Fleet. Became one of the first two squadrons to fly the Light Airborne Multi-Purpose System (LAMPS Mk I) helicopter and was redesignated Helicopter Antisubmarine Squadron (Light) THIRTY (HSL-30) in March 1972 operating as the Atlantic Fleet FRS. The squadron was disestablished on 30 September 1993. (Note: this squadron is also listed in the HU/HC section below)

Designation	Insignia	Nickname	Aircraft	Squadron Lineage	Disestablished
HU-4		Invaders	HTL/TH-13, HUL/UH-13, HRS/CH-19, HSS/SH-34, HUS/UH-34	HU-4: 1 July 1960 – 4 July 1965	
HC-4 (first use)		Invaders	TH-13, UH-13, CH-19, SH-34, UH-34, UH-46A, UH-2B, HH-2D, SH-2D	HC-4(1st): 4 July 1965-Mar 1972	
HSL-30		Neptune's Horsemen	HH-2D, SH-2F	HSL-30: Mar 1972-30 Sep 1993	30 September 1993

Helicopter Combat Support Squadron FIVE (1st) / Helicopter Antisubmarine (Light) Squadron THIRTY-ONE:
Established on 1 September 1967 from a detachment of HC-1 becoming one of the first two squadrons to fly the Light Airborne Multi-Purpose System (LAMPS Mk I) helicopter. Was redesignated Helicopter Antisubmarine Squadron (Light) THIRTY-ONE (HSL-31) in March 1972 and operated as the Pacific Fleet FRS. Disestablished on 31 July 1992. (Note: this squadron is also listed in the HU/HC section below)

Designation	Insignia	Nickname	Aircraft	Squadron Lineage	Disestablished
HC-5 (first use)		Arch Angels	CH-19E, UH-2, SH-3A, RH-3A, SH-34J, HH-2D, SH-2D	HC-5(1st): 1 Sep 1967-31 Mar 1972	
HSL-31		Arch Angels	HH-2D, SH-2F	HSL-31: Mar 1972-31 Jul 1992	31 July 1992

Helicopter Antisubmarine (Light) Squadron THIRTY-TWO:
Established on 17 August 1973. Provided detachments to Atlantic Fleet surface force ships. Disestablished on 31 January 1994.

Designation	Insignia	Nickname	Aircraft	Squadron Lineage	Disestablished
HSL-32		Invaders	SH-2F	HSL-32: 17 Aug 1973-31 Jan 1994	31 January 1994

Helicopter Antisubmarine (Light) Squadron THIRTY-THREE:
Established on 31 July 1973. Provided detachments to Pacific Fleet surface force ships. Disestablished on 29 April 1994.

Designation	Insignia	Nickname	Aircraft	Squadron Lineage	Disestablished
HSL-33		Seasnakes	SH-2F	HSL-33: 31 July 1973-29 Apr 1994	29 April 1994

Helicopter Antisubmarine (Light) Squadron THIRTY-FOUR:
Established on 27 September 1974. Provided detachments to Atlantic Fleet surface force ships. Disestablished on 30 November 1993.

Designation	Insignia	Nickname	Aircraft	Squadron Lineage	Disestablished
HSL-34		Greencheckers	SH-2F	HSL-34: 27 Sep 1974-30 Nov 1993	30 November 1993

Helicopter Antisubmarine (Light) Squadron THIRTY-FIVE:
Established on 15 January 1974. Provided detachments to Pacific Fleet surface force ships. Disestablished on 4 December 1992.

Designation	Insignia	Nickname	Aircraft	Squadron Lineage	Disestablished
HSL-35		Magicians (Note: an unrelated squadron HSM-35, established on 2 May 2013 adopted the "Magicians" name and insignia)	SH-2F	HSL-35: 15 Jan 1974-4 Dec 1992	4 December 1992

Helicopter Antisubmarine (Light) Squadron THIRTY-SIX:
Established on 26 September 1975. Provided detachments to Atlantic Fleet surface force ships. Disestablished on 30 September 1992.

Designation	Insignia	Nickname	Aircraft	Squadron Lineage	Disestablished
HSL-36		Lamplighters	SH-2F	HSL-36: 26 Sep 1975-30 Sep 1992	30 September 1992

Helicopter Antisubmarine (Light) Squadron THIRTY-SEVEN:
Established on 3 July 1975. Based in Hawaii to provid detachments to surface force ships homeported at Pearl Harbor. Redesignated Helicopter Maritime Strike Squadron THIRTY-SEVEN in October 2013. Remains active as HSM-37.

Designation	Insignia	Nickname	Aircraft	Squadron Lineage	Current Designation
HSL-37		Easy Riders	SH-2F, SH-60B	HSL-37: 3 Jul 1975-Oct 2013; HSM-37: Oct 2013–present	HSM-37

Helicopter Antisubmarine (Light) Squadron FORTY:
Established on 4 October 1985 as the Atlantic Fleet FRS for the new SH-60B LAMPS Mk III helicopter. Redesignated Helicopter Maritime Strike Squadron FORTY in November 2009. Remains active as HSM-40.

Designation	Insignia	Nickname	Aircraft	Squadron Lineage	Current Designation
HSL-40		Airwolves	SH-60B	HSL-40: 4 Oct 1985-Nov 2009; HSM-40: Nov 2009–present	HSM-40

Helicopter Antisubmarine (Light) Squadron FORTY-ONE:
Established on 21 January 1983 as the Pacific Fleet FRS for the new SH-60B LAMPS Mk III helicopter. Redesignated Helicopter Maritime Strike Squadron FORTY-ONE in December 2006. Remains active as HSM-41.

Designation	Insignia	Nickname	Aircraft	Squadron Lineage	Current Designation
HSL-41		Seahawks	SH-60B	HSL-41: 21 Jan 1983-Dec 2006; HSM-41: Dec 2006–present	HSM-41

Helicopter Antisubmarine (Light) Squadron FORTY-TWO:
Established on 5 October 1984. Provided detachments to Atlantic Fleet surface force ships. Redesignated Helicopter Maritime Strike Squadron SEVENTY-TWO on 15 January 2013. Remains active as HSM-72.

Designation	Insignia	Nickname	Aircraft	Squadron Lineage	Current Designation
HSL-42		Proud Warriors	SH-60B	HSL-42: 5 Oct 1984-15 Jan 2013; HSM-72: 15 Jan 2013–present	HSM-72

Helicopter Antisubmarine (Light) Squadron FORTY-THREE:
Established on 5 October 1984. Provided detachments to Pacific Fleet surface force ships. Redesignated Helicopter Maritime Strike Squadron SEVENTY-THREE February 2012. Remains active as HSM-73.

Designation	Insignia	Nickname	Aircraft	Squadron Lineage	Current Designation
HSL-43		Battle Cats	SH-60B	HSL-43: 5 Oct 1984-Feb 2012; HSM-73: Feb 2012–present	HSM-73

Helicopter Antisubmarine (Light) Squadron FORTY-FOUR:
Established on 21 August 1986. Provided detachments to Atlantic Fleet surface force ships. Redesignated Helicopter Maritime Strike Squadron SEVENTY-FOUR on 9 June 2011. Remains active as HSM-74.

Designation	Insignia	Nickname	Aircraft	Squadron Lineage	Current Designation
HSL-44		Swamp Foxes	SH-60B	HSL-44: 21 Aug 1986-9 Jun 2011; HSM-74: 9 Jun 2011–present	HSM-74

Helicopter Antisubmarine (Light) Squadron FORTY-FIVE:
Established on 3 October 1986. Provided detachments to Pacific Fleet surface force ships. Redesignated Helicopter Maritime Strike Squadron SEVENTY-FIVE in February 2011. Remains active as HSM-75.

Designation	Insignia	Nickname	Aircraft	Squadron Lineage	Current Designation
HSL-45		Wolfpack	SH-60B	HSL-45: 3 Oct 1986-Feb 2011; HSM-75: Feb 2011–present	HSM-75

Helicopter Antisubmarine (Light) Squadron FORTY-SIX:
Established on 7 April 1988. Provided detachments to Atlantic Fleet surface force ships. Redesignated Helicopter Maritime Strike Squadron FORTY-SIX in March 2012. Remains active as HSM-46.

Designation	Insignia	Nickname	Aircraft	Squadron Lineage	Current Designation
HSL-46		Grandmasters	SH-60B	HSL-46: 7 Apr 1988-Mar 2012; HSM-46: Mar 2012–present	HSM-46

Helicopter Antisubmarine (Light) Squadron FORTY-SEVEN:
Established on 25 September 1987. Provided detachments to Pacific Fleet surface force ships. Redesignated Helicopter Maritime Strike Squadron SEVENTY-SEVEN on 2 April 2009. Remains active as HSM-77.

Designation	Insignia	Nickname	Aircraft	Squadron Lineage	Current Designation
HSL-47		Saberhawks	SH-60B	HSL-47: 25 Sep 1987-2 Apr 2009; HSM-77: 2 Apr 2009–present	HSM-77

Helicopter Antisubmarine (Light) Squadron FORTY-EIGHT:
Established on 7 September 1989. Provided detachments to Atlantic Fleet surface force ships. Redesignated Helicopter Maritime Strike Squadron FORTY-EIGHT in May 2014. Remains active as HSM-48.

Designation	Insignia	Nickname	Aircraft	Squadron Lineage	Current Designation
HSL-48		Vipers	SH-60B	HSL-48: 7 Sep 1989-May 2014; HSM-48: May 2014 – present	HSM-48

Helicopter Antisubmarine (Light) Squadron FORTY-NINE:
Established on 23 March 1990. Provided detachments to Pacific Fleet surface force ships. Redesignated Helicopter Maritime Strike Squadron FORTY-NINE on 1 April 2015. Remains active as HSM-49.

Designation	Insignia	Nickname	Aircraft	Squadron Lineage	Current Designation
HSL-49		Scorpions	SH-60B	HSL-49: 23 Mar 1990-1 Apr 2015; HSM-49: 1 Apr 2015–present	HSM-49

Helicopter Antisubmarine (Light) Squadron FIFTY:
Established on 1 October 1991. Based at NAF Atsugi, Japan to provide detachments to surface force ships homeported at Yokosuka, Japan. Also operated a UH-3H VIP transport detachment from 1991 to 2006 in support of Commander, Seventh Fleet. Redesignated Helicopter Maritime Strike Squadron FIFTY on 7 March 2013. Remains active as HSM-50.

Designation	Insignia	Nickname	Aircraft	Squadron Lineage	Current Designation
HSL-51		Warlords	SH-60B, UH-3H	HSL-51: 1 Oct 1991-7 Mar 2013; HSM-51: 7 Mar 2013–present	HSM-51

== Attack (Light) (HAL) squadrons ==
The Helicopter Attack (Light) Squadron (HAL) designation was created in 1967 when HC-1's attack helicopter detachment conducting operations in Vietnam was established as a separate squadron designated HAL-3. In 1976 and 1977 two Navy Reserve HAL squadrons were established as HAL-4 and HAL-5. Those USNR squadrons are listed in the "U. S. Navy Reserve Squadrons" section at the end of the article.

Helicopter Attack (Light) Squadron THREE:
Established on 1 April 1967 from a detachment of HC-1 to provide aerial fire support to U.S. Navy riverine and other U.S. forces conducting combat operations in the Mekong Delta of South Vietnam. Disestablished on 26 January 1972.

Designation	Insignia	Nickname	Aircraft	Squadron Lineage	Disestablished
HAL-3		Seawolves	UH-1B, UH-1C, UH-1L, UH-1M; HH-1K	HAL-3: 1 April 1967 – 26 Jan 1972	25 January 1972

== Mine Countermeasure (HM) squadrons ==
The HM designation was established in 1971 to designate Mine Countermeasures squadrons when Helicopter Mine Countermeasures squadron TWELVE (HM-12) was established from a detachment of HC-6. That HC-6 detachment had been developing mine countermeasures equipment and procedures using converted H-3 Sea Kings (designated RH-3A) and later H-53 Sea Stallions (designated RH-53A) prior to its establishment as HM-12. In 1978 HM-14 and HM-16 were established from detachments of HM-12 following the HC numbering convention of even squadrons in the Atlantic Fleet. The first Pacific fleet squadron was not established until 1987 as HM-15. In addition to the primary mission of mine countermeasures HM squadrons often maintained detachments to provide heavy lift logistics to the Fleet. There were also two Navy Reserve HM squadrons established in 1986 and 1989 designated HM-18 (Atlantic Fleet) and HM-19 (Pacific Fleet) which are listed in the "U. S. Navy Reserve Squadrons" section at the end of the article.

In the 1990s the Navy began a multi-decade transition from operating eight different type/model/series helicopters aiming to reduce to just two by the 2010s, the MH-60R and the MH-60S. It recognized however that the replacement of the MH-53E in the mine countermeasures role was dependent on technology which had not yet matured. As a result, HM squadrons continued in service with the only helicopter capable of effectively conducting airborne mine countermeasures. In 2025 that technology finally matured enough to allow MH-60S helicopters of Sea Combat Squadrons (HSC) to assume the airborne mine countermeasures role in conjunction with mine warfare configured Littoral Combat Ships finally allowing for the retirement of the MH-53E.

Note: The parenthetical (1st) and (2) appended to the two HM-12 entries below are not a part of the squadron designation system. They indicate that the designation was used more than once during the history of U.S. Naval Aviation and which use of the designation is indicated.

Helicopter Mine Countermeasures Squadron TWELVE(1st):
Established from Helicopter Support Squadron SIX's (HC-6) H-53 detachment and designated HM-12 (first use of the designation) on 1 April 1971. Operated as both an operational squadron and as the FRS. Both HM-14 and HM-16 were ultimately established from detachments of this squadron. Disestablished on 30 September 1994.

Designation	Insignia	Nickname	Aircraft	Squadron Lineage	Disestablished
HM-12 (first use)		Sea Dragons	RH-53A, RH-53D, CH-53E, MH-53E	HM-12(1st): 1 Apr 1971-30 Sep 1994	30 September 1994

Helicopter Mine Countermeasures Squadron TWELVE(2nd):
Established on 1 October 2015 as the MH-53E FRS to consolidate and better control the training and certification of MH-53E crews and maintenance personnel. When the first HM-12 was disestablished on 30 September 1994 the "Airborne Mine Countermeasures Weapon Systems Training School (AWSTS)" was created at Naval Station Norfolk to conduct classroom and simulator training for replacement aircrew and maintenance personnel whose on aircraft training was then completed at HMHT-302 which was the USMC CH-53E FRS aboard Marine Corps Air Station New River. In January 2001 HM-14 assumed responsibility from HMHT-302 for the on aircraft training. HM-14 then functioned as an operational squadron with additional responsibility for that training. On 1 October 2015 all training was once again consolidated into a new dedicated FRS designated HM-12(2nd). The squadron was deactivated on 31 July 2025 after it had ceased operations in March of that year as a part of the Navy's retirement of the MH-53E.

Designation	Insignia	Nickname	Aircraft	Squadron Lineage	Notes	Deactivated
HM-12 (Second use)		Sea Dragons	MH-53E	HM-12(2nd): 1 Oct 2015–31 Jul 2025	This squadron assumed the nickname and a modified insignia of the previous HM-12	31 July 2025

Helicopter Mine Countermeasures Squadron FOURTEEN:
Established from a detachment of HM-12(1st) on 12 May 1978. Deactivated on 30 March 2023.

Designation	Insignia	Nickname	Aircraft	Squadron Lineage	Deactivated
HM-14		Vanguard	RH-53D, MH-53E	HM-14: 12 May 1978-30 Mar 2023	30 March 2023

Helicopter Mine Countermeasures Squadron SIXTEEN:
Established from a detachment of HM-12(1st) on 27 October 1978. Disestablished on 2 January 1987.

Designation	Insignia	Nickname	Aircraft	Squadron Lineage	Disestablished
HM-16		Seahawks	RH-53D	HM-14: 27 Oct 1978-2 Jan 1987	2 January 1987

== Sea Combat (HSC) squadrons ==
The Helicopter Sea Combat (HSC) designation was created April 2005 when the Helicopter Combat Support (HC) squadrons had completed their transitions from the H-46 Sea Knight to the multi-mission MH-60S Seahawk. Beginning in 2007 the Helicopter Anti-submarine (HS) squadrons began transitioning from their SH-60F and HH-60H Seahawks to the MH-60S and were redesignated HSC as well. Therefore, some current HSC squadrons are former HC squadrons and others are former HS squadrons. There were also two new squadrons established on 1 October 2006 as HSC squadrons, one of which (HSC-22) was deactivated on 30 June 2023 but was subsequently reactivated on 1 April 2026, and there were two Navy Reserve HSC squadrons designated HSC-84 and HSC-85 which are listed in the "U. S. Navy Reserve Squadrons" section at the end of the article.

There is a single deactivated squadron listed below which is also listed in the HS section above. HSC-84 and HSC-85 are also deactivated HSC squadrons but they were USNR squadrons and are listed in the USNR squadron section below.

Helicopter Antisubmarine Squadron / Helicopter Sea Combat Squadron FIFTEEN:
Established as Helicopter Antisubmarine Squadron FIFTEEN (HS-15) on 29 October 1971 to participate in Sea Control Ship experimentation aboard USS Guam from January 1972 to mid 1974 after which it operated as an Atlantic Fleet aircraft carrier based squadron. Redesignated Helicopter Sea Combat Squadron FIFTEEN (HSC-15) in November 2012 continuing as an aircraft carrier based squadron. The squadron was deactivated on 31 March 2017 as part of the deactivation of Carrier Air Wing FOURTEEN.

Designation	Insignia	Nickname	Aircraft	Squadron Lineage	Deactivated
HS-15		Red Lions	SH-3G, SH-3H, SH-60F, HH-60H	HS-15: 29 October 1971-Nov 2102	
HSC-15		Red Lions	MH-60S	HSC-15: Nov 2012-31 Mar 2017	31 March 2017

== Utility (HU) and Combat Support (HC) squadrons ==
The HU designation was the first designation created for an operational Navy helicopter squadron. It was created in 1948 with the establishment of the Navy's first two operational helicopter squadrons: Helicopter Utility squadrons ONE and TWO (HU-1 and HU-2). In July 1960 a third HU squadron was established as Helicopter Utility squadron FOUR (HU-4). In July 1965 the Helicopter Combat Support designation (HC) was created when the three existing Helicopter Utility squadrons (HU-1, HU-2 and HU-4) were redesignated Helicopter Combat Support squadrons (HC-1, HC-2 and HC-4). The HC designation designated squadrons with the primary functions of either logistics or the provision of utility services with two exceptions; HC-7 and HC-9 (USNR) which were Combat Search and Rescue squadrons. In April 2005 all existing HC squadrons but one were redesignated Helicopter Sea Combat (HSC) squadrons and the single remaining HC squadron (the second squadron to be designated HC-4) was deactivated on 28 September 2007. Since 28 September 2007 the HC designation exists only "on paper" as the designation for that single inactive squadron.

HU/HC squadrons were numbered sequentially beginning with HU-1 and HU-2 with odd numbers given to Pacific Fleet squadrons and even numbers to Atlantic Fleet squadrons which is the opposite scheme from that of the HS squadrons but is the same as the HSL squadron numbering. The jump in the odd number designations (Pacific Fleet) below from HC-7 to HC-11 is because HC-9 was a Navy Reserve squadron and is listed in the "U. S. Navy Reserve squadrons" section at the bottom of the article. The even number gap (Atlantic Fleet) from HC-8 to HC-16 occurred because HC-16 was originally designated HCT-16 by the Naval Air Training Command because it provided plane guard services aboard the training aircraft carrier USS Lexington (AVT-16). It was redesignated HC-16 by simply dropping the "T" when it was administratively transferred from the Naval Air Training Command to Commander, Naval Air Force Atlantic Fleet in 1977.

In addition to HC-9, HC-85 was also a Navy Reserve squadron. Those Navy Reserve squadrons are listed in the "U. S. Navy Reserve Squadrons" section at the end of the article.

There are six disestablished squadrons and one deactivated squadron listed below. There are also six entries listing former designations of currently active squadrons.

Note: The parenthetical (1st) and (2nd) appended to some designations in the tables below are not a part of the squadron designation system. They are added to indicate that the designation was used more than once during the history of U.S. Naval Aviation and which use of the designation is indicated. Absence indicates that the designation was used only once.

Helicopter Utility Squadron ONE / Helicopter Combat Support Squadron ONE:
Established on 1 April 1948 as HU-1 and redesignated HC-1 on 4 July 1965. Provided plane guard detachments to aircraft carriers and utility and logistics helicopter detachments for the Pacific Fleet. Helicopter Light Attack Squadron THREE (HAL-3) was established from an HC-1 detachment on 1 Apr 1967 and HC-3 (vertical replenishment-VERTREP), HC-5(1st) (Light Airborne Multi-Purpose System-LAMPS) and HC-7 (Combat Search and Rescue-CSAR) were established from HC-1 detachments on 1 September 1967. Operated as an H-3 FRS from 1989 to 1993. Disestablished on 29 April 1994.

Designation	Insignia	Nickname	Aircraft	Squadron Lineage	Disestablished
HU-1		Pacific Fleet Angels	HO3S, HTL, HUL, HUK, HUP, HO4S/CH-19, HSS/SH-34, HUS/CH-34, UH-2A, B, UH-46A, RH-3A	HU-1: 1 Apr 1948 – 4 Jul 1965	
HC-1		Fleet Angels	HH-3A, RH-3A, UH-1B, UH-46A, D, UH-2A, B, C, HH-2C, SH-3A, G, D, H, CH-53E	HC-1: 4 Jul 1965 – 29 Apr 1994	29 April 1994

Helicopter Utility Squadron TWO / Helicopter Combat Support Squadron TWO(1st):
Established on 1 April 1948 as HU-2 and redesignated HC-2 on 4 July 1965. Provided plane guard detachments to aircraft carriers and utility and logistics helicopter detachments for the Atlantic Fleet. Helicopter Utility Squadron FOUR (HU-4) was established from an HU-2 detachment on 1 July 1960. Disestablished on 30 September 1977.

Designation	Insignia	Nickname	Aircraft	Squadron Lineage	Disestablished
HU-2		Atlantic Fleet Angels	HO3S, HTL, HRP, HO4S, HTK, HUL, HUP/UH-25C, HSS/SH-34, UH-2A	HU-2: 1 Apr 1948 – 4 Jul 1965	
HC-2 (first use)		Fleet Angels	SH-34J, UH-2A, C, HH-2D, SH-3G	HC-2(1st): 4 Jul 1965 – 30 Sep 1977	30 September 1977

Helicopter Combat Support Squadron TWO(2nd):
Established as HC-2 (the second use of the designation) on 1 April 1987. The squadron was established by merging HM-12's MH-53E Vertical Onboard Delivery (VOD) detachment, HC-6's VH-3A VIP transport detachment and HS-1's SH-3G detachments supporting Commander, Middle Eastern Force (COMMIDEASTFOR) in Bahrain and Commander, Sixth Fleet in Gaeta, Italy into this single squadron. The squadron's original nickname was "Circuit Riders" but it adopted the name "Fleet Angels" in 1994 when HC-1 was disestablished freeing up the nickname (both HU-1 and HU-2 had been named "Fleet Angels" and both had carried the name through their redesignations to HC-1 and HC-2(1st)). It also adopted the insignia of HC-2(1st) in 1994 at the same time the nickname was adopted. It operated as an H-3 FRS from 1997 to 2006. The squadron was redesignated Helicopter Sea Combat Squadron TWO (HSC-2) on 1 January 2006 and remains an active squadron as HSC-2.

Designation	Insignia	Nickname	Aircraft	Squadron Lineage	Current Designation
HC-2 (second use)	(1987) (1994)	Circuit Riders (1987); Fleet Angels (1994)	CH-53E, MH-53E, VH-3A, SH-3G, UH-3H	HC-2(2nd): 1 Apr 1987 – 1 Jan 2006; HSC-2: 1 Jan 2006–present	HSC-2

Helicopter Combat Support Squadron THREE:
Established on 1 September 1967 from a detachment of HC-1 to provide Vertical Replenishment (VERTREP) detachments aboard supply ships. Operated as an H-46 FRS from 1982 to 2002. Transitioned to the MH-60S in 2002 and operated as an MH-60S FRS. The squadron was redesignated Helicopter Sea Combat Squadron THREE (HSC-3) on 1 January 2006 and remains an active squadron as HSC-3.

Designation	Insignia	Nickname	Aircraft	Squadron Lineage	Current Designation
HC-3		Packrats	H-46, MH-60S	HC-3: 1 Sep 1967 – 1 Apr 2005; HSC-3: 1 Apr 2005–present	HSC-3

Helicopter Utility Squadron FOUR / Helicopter Combat Support Squadron FOUR(1st) / Helicopter Antisubmarine (Light) Squadron THIRTY:
Established as HU-4 from a detachment of HU-2 on 1 July 1960 and redesignated HC-4 (first use of the designation) on 4 July 1965. Provided utility and logistics helicopter detachments for the Atlantic Fleet (HC-6 was established from a detachment of HC-4 on 1 September 1967). Became one of the first two squadrons to fly the Light Airborne Multi-Purpose System (LAMPS Mk I) helicopter and was redesignated Helicopter Antisubmarine (Light) Squadron THIRTY (HSL-30) in March 1972. The squadron was disestablished on 30 September 1993. (Note: This squadron is also listed in the HSL section above).

Designation	Insignia	Nickname	Aircraft	Squadron Lineage	Disestablished
HU-4		Invaders	HTL/TH-13, HUL/UH-13, HRS/CH-19, HSS/SH-34, HUS/UH-34	HU-4: 1 July 1960 – 4 July 1965	
HC-4 (first use)		Invaders	TH-13, UH-13, CH-19, SH-34, UH-34, UH-46A, UH-2B, HH-2D, SH-2D	HC-4(1st): 4 July 1965-Mar 1972	
HSL-30		Neptune's Horsemen	HH-2D, SH-2F	HSL-30: Mar 1972-30 Sep 1993	30 September 1993

Helicopter Combat Support Squadron FOUR (2nd):
Established as HC-4 (second use of the designation) on 6 May 1983 to provided heavy lift Vertical Onboard Delivery (VOD) logistics to Carrier Battle Groups operating in the Mediterranean Sea from its base aboard Naval Air Station Sigonella, Sicily. Deactivated on 30 September 2007.

Designation	Insignia	Nickname	Aircraft	Squadron Lineage	Deactivated
HC-4 (second use)		Black Stallions	CH-53E; MH-53E	HC-4(2nd): 6 May 1983 – 30 Sep 2007	30 September 2007

Helicopter Combat Support Squadron FIVE (1st) / Helicopter Antisubmarine (Light) Squadron THIRTY-ONE:
Established on 1 September 1967 from a detachment of HC-1 becoming one of the first two squadrons to fly the Light Airborne Multi-Purpose System (LAMPS Mk I) helicopter. Was redesignated Helicopter Antisubmarine (Light) Squadron THIRTY-ONE (HSL-31) in March 1972. Disestablished on 31 July 1992. (Note: This squadron is also listed in the HSL section above).

Designation	Insignia	Nickname	Aircraft	Squadron Lineage	Disestablished
HC-5 (first use)		Arch Angeles	CH-19E, UH-2, SH-3A, RH-3A, SH-34J, HH-2D, SH-2D	HC-5(1st): 1 Sep 1967-Mar 1972	
HSL-31		Arch Angels	HH-2D, SH-2F	HSL-31: Mar 1972-31 Jul 1992	31 July 1992

Helicopter Combat Support Squadron FIVE (2nd):
Established as HC-5 (second use of the designation) on 3 February 1984 to provide Vertical Replenishment (VERTREP) detachments to Pacific Fleet ships and utility and search and rescue services in the Mariannas Islands from its base in Guam. The squadron was redesignated Helicopter Sea Combat Squadron TWENTY-FIVE (HSC-25) on 21 April 2005 and remains an active squadron as HSC-25.

Designation	Insignia	Nickname	Aircraft	Squadron Lineage	Current Designation
HC-5 (second use)		Providers	H-46, MH-60S	HC-5(2nd): 3 Feb 1984 – 21 Apr 2005; HSC-25: 21 Apr 2005–present	HSC-25

Helicopter Combat Support Squadron SIX:
Established from a detachment of HC-4(1st) on 1 September 1967 to provide utility detachments and Vertical Replenishment (VERTREP) detachments to Atlantic Fleet ships. It pioneered airborne mine sweeping and in April 1971 Helicopter Mine Countermeasures Squadron TWELVE (HM-12) was established from an HC-6 Detachment. The squadron was redesignated Helicopter Sea Combat Squadron TWENTY-SIX (HSC-26) in April 2005 and remains an active squadron as HSC-26.

Designation	Insignia	Nickname	Aircraft	Squadron Lineage	Current Designation
HC-6		Chargers	UH-43C, UH-34D, UH-2B, RH-3A, VH-3A, RH-53A, H-46, MH-60S	HC-6: 1 Sep 1967-Apr 2005; HSC-26: Apr 2005–present	HSC-26

Helicopter Combat Support Squadron SEVEN:
Established from a detachment of HC-1 on 1 September 1967 as a Japan-based utility squadron and to provide dedicated Combat Search and Rescue (CSAR) detachments in support of combat operations in Vietnam. Disestablished on 30 June 1975.

Designation	Insignia	Nickname	Aircraft	Squadron Lineage	Disestablished
HC-7		Seadevils	UH-2A, HH-2C, SH-3A, RH-3A, HH-3A, UH-3D, UH-46A	HC-7: 1 Sep 1967 – 30 Jun 1975	30 June 1975

Helicopter Combat Support Squadron EIGHT:
Established on 3 December 1984 as an Atlantic Fleet Vertical Replenishment (VERTREP) squadron. Redesignated Helicopter Sea Combat Squadron TWENTY-EIGHT (HSC-28) in April 2005 and remains an active squadron as HSC-28.

Designation	Insignia	Nickname	Aircraft	Squadron Lineage	Current Designation
HC-8		Dragon Whales	H-46, MH-60S	HC-8: 3 Dec 1984-Apr 2005; HSC-28: Apr 2005–present	HSC-28

Helicopter Combat Support Squadron ELEVEN:
Established on 1 October 1977 as a Pacific Fleet Vertical Replenishment (VERTREP) squadron. Redesignated Helicopter Sea Combat Squadron TWENTY-ONE (HSC-21) in April 2005 and remains an active squadron as HSC-21.

Designation	Insignia	Nickname	Aircraft	Squadron Lineage	Current Designation
HC-11		Gunbearers	UH-3H, H-46, MH-60S	HC-11: 1 Oct 1977-Apr 2005; HSC-21: Apr 2005–present	HSC-21

Helicopter Combat Support (Training) Squadron SIXTEEN / Helicopter Combat Support Squadron SIXTEEN:
Established on 1 November 1974 as HCT-16 to provide plane guard services aboard the training carrier USS Lexington (AVT-16) and search and rescue services for Naval Air Training Command operations in the Pensacola Florida area. Redesignated HC-16 in May 1977 when the squadron was administratively transferred from the Naval Air Training Command to Commander, Naval Air Force Atlantic Fleet. Also operated as an H-46 FRS from 1977 to 1982 and an HH-1N FRS from 1979 to 1994. Disestablished on 1 April 1994.

Designation	Insignia	Nickname	Aircraft	Squadron Lineage	Disestablished
HCT-16		Bullfrogs	UH-2C, HH-46A	HCT-16: 1 Nov 1974-May 1977	
HC-16		Bullfrogs	HH-46D, HH-1N, SH-3D	HC-16: May 1977-1 Apr 1994	1 April 1994

== U. S. Navy Reserve squadrons (HC) (HS) (HM) (HSL) (HAL) (HCS) (HSC) ==
The U. S. Navy Reserve established its first four helicopter squadrons in 1970. It established three more before the end of the 1970s and three in the decade of the 1980s for a total of ten squadrons. Four of those squadrons were disestablished in the 1990s leaving six squadrons going into the 21st century, all of which were subsequently disestablished or deactivated by 2023. In 2001 it had established an eleventh squadron which after 2023 was the only active Navy Reserve Helicopter squadron until a twelfth squadron was established in 2026 making two currently active USNR helicopter squadrons at present. The squadrons listed below are listed in order of establishment date.

Helicopter Antisubmarine Squadron / Helicopter Antisubmarine (Light) Squadron SEVENTY-FOUR:
U. S. Navy Reserve Squadron. Established 1 June 1970 as HS-74 as a squadron of Antisubmarine Carrier Air Group Reserve SEVENTY. Redesignated HSL-74 in January 1985 when the squadron's aircraft carrier based SH-3 Sea Kings were replaced with frigate, destroyer and cruiser based Light Airborne Multi-Purpose System (LAMPS) SH-2 Seasprites. The squadron was disestablished on 1 April 1994.

Designation	Insignia	Nickname	Aircraft	Squadron Lineage	Disestablished
HS-74		Minutemen	SH-3A, SH-3D	HS-74: 1 June 1970-Jan 1985	
HSL-74		Demon Elves	SH-2F	HSL-74: Jan 1985-1 April 1994	1 April 1994

Helicopter Antisubmarine Squadron SEVENTY-FIVE:
U. S. Navy Reserve Squadron. Established on 1 June 1970 as a squadron of Antisubmarine Carrier Air Group Reserve SEVENTY (CVSGR-70) until CVSGR-70's deactivation in 1976 then supported Carrier Air Wing Reserve THIRTY (CVWR-20) until its deactivation on 1 April 2007.

Designation	Insignia	Nickname	Aircraft	Squadron Lineage	Deactivated
HS-75		Emerald Knights	SH-3A, SH-3D, SH-3H, SH-60F, HH-60H	HS-75: 1 June 1970 – 1 Apr 2007	1 April 2007

Helicopter Antisubmarine Squadron / Helicopter Antisubmarine (Light) Squadron EIGHTY-FOUR:
U. S. Navy Reserve Squadron. Established 1 July 1970 as HS-84 as a squadron of Antisubmarine Carrier Air Group Reserve EIGHTY. Redesignated HSL-84 in April 1984 when the squadron's aircraft carrier based SH-3 Sea Kings were replaced with frigate, destroyer and cruiser based Light Airborne Multi-Purpose System (LAMPS) SH-2 Seasprites. The squadron was deactivated on 30 June 2001.

Designation	Insignia	Nickname	Aircraft	Squadron Lineage	Deactivated
HS-84		Thunderbolts	SH-3A, SH-3D	HS-84: 1 July 1970-Apr 1984	
HSL-84		Thunderbolts	SH-2F, SH-2G	HSL-84: Apr 1984-30 Jun 2001	30 Jun 2001

Helicopter Antisubmarine Squadron / Helicopter Combat Support Squadron / Helicopter Sea Combat Squadron EIGHTY-FIVE:
U. S. Navy Reserve Squadron. Established 1 July 1970 as HS-85 as a squadron of Antisubmarine Carrier Air Group Reserve EIGHTY (CVSGR-80) until CVSGR-80's deactivation in 1976 then supported Carrier Air Wing Reserve THIRTY (CVWR-30) until CVWR-30's disestablishment in 1994. Redesignated HC-85 in October 1994 when the squadron was re-tasked in a utility role supporting the U. S. Navy Southern California Offshore Range (SCORE) complex off of San Diego and performing other utility functions. Redesignated Helicopter Sea Combat Squadron EIGHTY-FIVE (HSC-85) in February 2006 continuing its utility role until it was re-tasked in 2011 as a second Combat Search and Rescue (CSAR) and Naval Special Warfare (SEAL) support squadron alongside HSC-84 adopting the "Firehawks" name and insignia from HCS-5 which had been deactivated on 31 December 2006. Deactivated on 30 September 2023.

Designation	Insignia	Nickname	Aircraft	Squadron Lineage	Deactivated
HS-85		Golden Gators	SH-3A, SH-3D, SH-3H	HS-85: 1 Jul 1970-Oct 1994	
HC-85		Golden Gators	UH-3H, MH-60S	HC-85: Oct 1994-8 Feb 2006	
HSC-85	(2006) (2011)	Highrollers (2006); Firehawks (2011)	MH-60S (2006); HH-60H (2011); MH-60S (2018) (Note: the HH-60H was retired from service in 2018)	HSC-85: 8 Feb 2006–30 Sep 2023	30 September 2023

Helicopter Combat Support Squadron NINE:
U. S Navy Reserve squadron. Established on 1 August 1975 to preserve a Combat Search and Rescue capability after the disestablishment of the active component's Combat Search and Rescue squadron (HC-7) a month prior. Disestablished on 31 July 1990.

Designation	Insignia	Nickname	Aircraft	Squadron Lineage	Disestablished
HC-9		Black Cats, Protectors	HH-3A	HC-9: 1 Aug 1975 – 31 Jul 1990	31 July 1990

Helicopter Attack (Light) Squadron / Helicopter Combat Support (Special) Squadron FOUR / Helicopter Sea Combat Squadron EIGHTY-FOUR:
United States Navy Reserve Squadron. Established as HAL-4 on 1 July 1976 to preserve the expertise gained by HAL-3 during the Vietnam War. In 1989 the squadron's HH-1K aircraft were replaced with HH-60H Seahawks and the squadron's focus was shifted towards a Combat Search and Rescue (CSAR) role as the Navy Reserve's dedicated CSAR squadron (HC-9) was in the process of being disestablished. The squadron was redesignated HCS-4 in October 1989 to reflect the move from a light attack to a more multi-mission attack, CSAR and Naval Special Warfare (SEAL) support role. In October 2006 the squadron was redesignated Helicopter Sea Combat Squadron EIGHTY-FOUR (HSC-84) continuing in the same multi-mission role until it was deactivated in March 2016 leaving HSC-85 as the sole CSAR, Naval Special Warfare support squadron until its deactivation in 2023.

Designation	Insignia	Nickname	Aircraft	Squadron Lineage	Deactivated
HAL-4		Redwolves	HH-1K	HAL-4: 1 Jul 1976-Oct 1989	
HCS-4		Redwolves	HH-60H	HCS-4: Oct 1989-Oct 2006	
HSC-84		Redwolves	HH-60H	HSC-84: Oct 2006–31 Mar 2016	31 March 2016

Helicopter Attack (Light) Squadron / Helicopter Combat Support (Special) Squadron FIVE:
United States Navy Reserve Squadron. Established as HAL-5 on 1 March 1977 to preserve the expertise gained by HAL-3 during the Vietnam War. In 1989 the squadron's HH-1K aircraft were replaced with HH-60H Seahawks and the squadron's focus was shifted towards a Combat Search and Rescue (CSAR) role as the Navy Reserve's dedicated CSAR squadron (HC-9) was in the process of being disestablished. The squadron was redesignated HCS-5 in October 1989 to reflect the move from a light attack to a more multi-mission attack, CSAR and Naval Special Warfare (SEAL) support role. On 31 December 2006 the squadron was deactivated. Four and a half years later in 2011, Helicopter Sea Combat Squadron EIGHTY-FIVE was re-tasked from its utility role to assume this squadron's attack, CSAR and Naval Special Warfare (SEAL) support role as a second squadron alongside HSC-84. That squadron (HSC-85) adopted the "Firehawks" name and insignia from this squadron.

Designation	Insignia	Nickname	Aircraft	Squadron Lineage	Deactivated
HAL-5		Blue Hawks	HH-1K	HAL-5: 1 Mar 1977-Oct 1989	
HCS-5		Firehawks	HH-60H	HCS-5: Oct 1989–31 Dec 2006	31 December 2006

Helicopter Antisubmarine (Light) Squadron NINETY-FOUR:
United States Navy Reserve Squadron. Established on 1 October 1985 to provide detachments of Light Airborne Multi-Purpose (LAMPS) helicopters for frigates, destroyers and cruisers. It was designated HSL-94 as it was the Navy Reserve's third HSL squadron, the other two being HSL-74 and HSL-84. It was the last squadron to fly the SH-2 Seasprite and it was deactivated on 1 April 2001 with the Seasprite's retirement.

Designation	Insignia	Nickname	Aircraft	Squadron Lineage	Deactivated
HSL-94		Titans	SH-2F, SH-2G	HSL-94: 1 Oct 1985-1 Apr 2001	1 April 2001

Helicopter Mine Countermeasures Squadron EIGHTEEN:
United States Navy Reserve Squadron. Established on 1 October 1986 as a reserve "partner" to the active component's HM-14. The squadron was disestablished on 4 March 1995 and its personnel and aircraft were integrated into HM-14.

Designation	Insignia	Nickname	Aircraft	Squadron Lineage	Disestablished
HM-18		Norsemen	RH-53D, MH-53E	HM-18: 1 Oct 1986-4 Mar 1995	4 March 1995

Helicopter Mine Countermeasures Squadron NINETEEN:
United States Navy Reserve Squadron. Established on 9 January 1989 as a reserve "partner" to the active component's HM-15. The squadron was disestablished on 5 November 1994 and its personnel and aircraft were integrated into HM-15.

Designation	Insignia	Nickname	Aircraft	Squadron Lineage	Disestablished
HM-19		Golden Bears	RH-53D, MH-53E	HM-19: 9 Jan 1989- 5 Nov 1994	5 November 1994

Helicopter Antisubmarine (Light) Squadron SIXTY:
Established on 1 April 2001, replacing HSL-94 which was disestablished on that day, to operate the SH-60B Seahawk which had replaced the SH-2 Seasprite in all of the active component HSL squadrons. In July 2015 it was redesignated Helicopter Maritime Strike Squadron SIXTY (HSM-60) as were all active component HSL squadrons as the SH-60B was replaced by the MH-60R. The squadron remains active as HSM-60.

Designation	Insignia	Nickname	Aircraft	Squadron Lineage	Current Designation
HSL-60		Jaguars	SH-60B	HSL-60: 1 Apr 2001-July 2015; HSM-60: July 2015 – present	HSM-60

== Other helicopter squadrons ==
Experimental and Development Squadron THREE(1st):
The Navy's first Helicopter Squadron was established on 1 July 1946 and was designated VX-3 (the first use of the designation). The "V" as the first letter of the squadron's designation followed the established system of designating heavier-than-air aircraft squadrons with a "V" and lighter-than-air (blimp) squadrons with the letter "Z". The mission of VX-3 was to develop the helicopter as an operational aircraft. In 1948 when the Navy established its first two operational helicopter squadrons it designated them "Helicopter Utility" (HU) squadrons departing from the established system of heavier-than-air "V" and lighter-than-air "Z" and creating a third designation of "H" for helicopter squadrons. From that time onward "V" has designated fixed wing squadrons and "H" rotary wing squadrons. Helicopter Utility Squadrons ONE and TWO (HU-1 and HU-2) were established on 1 April 1948 from the personnel and assets of this squadron and it was disestablished on that same day.

Designation	Insignia	Nickname	Aircraft	Squadron Lineage	Disestablished
VX-3 (first use)			HNS-1, HOS-1, HO3S-1, HTL-1, HRP-1	VX-3 (1st): 1 July 1946-1 Apr 1948	1 April 1948

Unmanned Helicopter Reconnaissance Squadron ONE:
Established on 20 September 2012 to function as a FRS to train the operators of Vertical Takeoff Unmanned Aerial Vehicle (VTUAV) systems who would then report to HSC and HSM squadrons or other units operating them. Was disestablished in March 2014 and the equipment and personnel were transitioned into a MQ-8 maintenance organization.

Designation	Insignia	Nickname	Aircraft	Squadron Lineage	Disestablished
HUQ-1			MQ-8	HUQ-1: 20 Sep 2012-Mar 2014	March 2014

== See also ==
- List of inactive United States Navy aircraft squadrons
- List of United States Navy aircraft squadrons
- List of United States Navy aircraft wings
- Modern US Navy carrier air operations
- List of United States Navy aircraft designations (pre-1962)
- List of active United States naval aircraft
- Naval aviator
- Naval flight officer
- United States Marine Corps Aviation

== References and notes ==
Notes

Bibliography

Dictionary of American Naval Aviation Squadrons:

- Grossnick, Roy A. (1995). Dictionary of American Naval Aviation Squadrons Volume 1 - The History of VA, VAH, VAK, VAL, VAP and VFA Squadrons. Naval Historic Center, Department of the Navy. ISBN 0-945274-29-7. Archived from the original on 3 July 1998.
- Roberts, Michael D. (2000). Dictionary of American Naval Aviation Squadrons Volume 2 T- The History of VP, VPB, VP(HL) and VP(AM) Squadrons. Naval Historic Center, Department of the Navy. Archived from the original on 15 September 2008.
