= Fleet Replacement Squadron =

Unit type in the US Navy and Marine Corps

A Fleet Replacement Squadron (FRS) is a unit of the United States Navy or Marine Corps that trains naval aviators, naval flight officers (NFOs), enlisted naval aircrewmen and maintenance personnel on the specific front-line aircraft they have been assigned to fly or maintain. Students, referred to as Replacement Pilots, Replacement Flight Officers or Replacement Aircrew are either newly winged aviators (Category I), aviators transitioning from one type aircraft to another (Category II), or aviators returning to the cockpit after a period of non-flying (Category III). After completing the training regimen, graduates are assigned to fleet squadrons. Additionally, FRSs are responsible for providing replacement aircraft for fleet squadron attrition, and for standardizing maintenance and aircraft operations.

The U.S. Navy and U.S Marine Corps sometimes share FRSs. For example, up until the recent establishment of an FRS for the Navy's new CMV-22 Osprey aircraft USN personnel were trained by the USMC's VMMT-204, and all USMC F-35C pilots and maintenance personnel are trained by the USN's VFA-125. In the past, USN H-53 students were once trained at the USMC H-53 FRS and F/A-18C/D students of both service were trained in either the USMC F/A-18C/D FRS or by one of the USN's F/A-18C/D FRSs. An FRS which trains students of both services will be staffed with instructors of both services as well.

From 1958 to 1970 the FRSs for carrier based aircraft were organized under Readiness Carrier Air Group FOUR (RCVG-4) or Readiness Antisubmarine Carrier Air Group FIFTY (RCVSG-50) in the Atlantic Fleet and Readiness Carrier Air Group TWELVE (RCVG-12) or Readiness Antisubmarine Carrier Air Group FIFTY ONE (RCVSG-51) in the Pacific Fleet. These Readiness Carrier Air Groups were colloquially called "Readiness Air Groups" or "RAGs" for short. In 1963 RCVG-4 and RCVG-12 were redesignated Readiness Carrier Air Wings RCVW-4 and RCVW-12 which had no affect on the use of the term "RAG" and in 1970 they and RCVSG-50 and 51 were disestablished which also had no affect on the use of the term "RAG" and to this day Fleet Replacement Squadrons are still referred to as "RAGs". When RCVW-4 and 12 and RCVSG-50 and 51 were disestablished in 1970 the Atlantic Fleet Fleet Replacement Squadrons were all realigned under the respective type wings and in the Pacific Fleet under the respective functional wings as they were all established from 1970 through 1973.

Note: The parenthetical (1st) or (2nd) appended to some squadron designations in the tables below are not a part of that squadron's designation. They are added to indicate that the designation was used more than one time during the history of U.S. Naval Aviation and to specify which use of the designation is indicated.

== Currently Active USN and USMC Fleet Replacement Squadrons ==
Since the disestablishment of RCVW-4, RCVW-12, RCVSG-50 and RCVSG-51 in 1970 all U.S Navy Fleet Replacement Squadrons (FRS)s are placed organizationally under the Type Wing commander for the respective aircraft type/model. U.S Marine Corps Fleet Replacement Squadrons are organizationally aligned under a Marine Aircraft Group (MAG) which operates that type/model aircraft.

=== US Navy ===
Insignia	Squadron Designation	Squadron Lineage	Current Aircraft	Wing	Notes
	HSC-2; Fleet Angels	HC-2(2nd): 1 Apr 1987-24 Aug 2005; HSC-2: 24 Aug 2005–present	MH-60S; Seahawk	Helicopter; Sea Combat Wing, U. S. Atlantic Fleet	NS Norfolk, VA; Established 1 Apr 1987 as the second squadron designated HC-2. Became an FRS in 1997. The earlier squadron designated HC-2 also called "Fleet Angels" existed from 1 Apr 1948 to 30 Sep 1977.
	HSC-3; Merlins	HC-3: 1 Sep 1967-31 Oct 2005; HSC-3: 31 Oct 2005–present	MH-60S; Seahawk	Helicopter; Sea Combat Wing, U. S. Pacific Fleet	NAS North Island, CA; Established 1 Sep 1967 as HC-3. Became an FRS in 1982.
	HSM-40; Air Wolves	HSL-40: 4 Oct 1985-1 Nov 2009; HSM-40: 1 Nov 2009–present	MH-60R; Seahawk	Helicopter; Maritime Strike Wing, U. S. Atlantic Fleet	NS Mayport, FL; Established 4 Oct 1985 as HSL-40 as an FRS.
	HSM-41; Sea Hawks	HSL-41: 21 Jan 1983-8 Dec 2005; HSM-41: 8 Dec 2005–present	MH-60R; Seahawk	Helicopter; Maritime Strike Wing, U. S. Pacific Fleet	NAS North Island, CA; Established 1 Jan 1983 as HSL-41 as an FRS.
	VAQ-129; Vikings	VAH-10: 1 May 1961-1 Sep 1970; VAQ-129: 1 Sep 1970–present	EA-18G; Growler	Electronic Attack Wing, U.S. Pacific Fleet	NAS Whidbey Island, WA; Established 1 May 1961 as VAH-10. Became an FRS in 1971.
	VAW-120; Grey Hawks	RVAW-120: 1 Jul 1967-1 May 1983; VAW-120: 1 May 1983 – present	E-2C,D; Hawkeye	Airborne Command & Control and Logistics Wing	NAS Norfolk, VA; Established 1 Jul 1967 as RVAW-120 as an FRS.
	VFA-106; Gladiators	VFA-106: 27 Apr 1984–present	F/A-18E, F/A-18F; Super Hornet	Strike Fighter Wing, U.S. Atlantic Fleet	NAS Oceana, VA; Established 27 Apr 1984 as an FRS. Adopted nickname and insignia of VA-106 which had been disestablished in 1969.
	VFA-122; Flying Eagles	VFA-122: 1 Oct 1998–present	F/A-18E, F/A-18F; Super Hornet	Strike Fighter Wing, U.S. Pacific Fleet	NAS Lemoore, CA; Established 1 Oct 1998 as an FRS. Adopted nickname and insignia of VA-122 which had been disestablished in 1991.
	VFA-125; Rough Raiders	VFA-125: 13 Nov 1980–present (inactive 1 Oct 2010 – 12 Jan 2017)	F-35C; Lightning II	Joint Strike Fighter Wing	NAS Lemoore, CA; Established 13 Nov 1980 as an FRS. Adopted nickname and insignia of VA-125 which had been disestablished in 1977. Deactivated on 1 Oct 2010 as a Hornet FRS and reactivated as a F-35C FRS on 12 Jan 2017.
	VP-30; Pro's Nest	VP-30: 30 Jun 1960–present	P-8A; Poseidon; MQ-4C; Triton	Commander, Patrol and Reconnaissance Group	NAS Jacksonville, FL; Established 30 Jun 1960 as an FRS.
	VQ-7; Roughnecks	Naval Training Support Unit: 1992-1 Nov 1999; VQ-7: 1 Nov 1999–present	E-6B; Mercury	Strategic Communications Wing ONE	Naval Air Facility Tinker AFB, OK; Established 1 Nov 1999 as an FRS.
	VRM-50; Sunhawks	VRM-50: 1 Oct 2019 – present	CMV-22B; Osprey	Fleet Logistics Multi-Mission Wing	NAS North Island, CA; Established 1 Oct 2019 as an FRS
	VUQ-10 Pathfinders	VUQ-10: 1 Oct 2022-present	MQ-25 Stingray	Airborne Command & Control and Logistics Wing	NAS Patuxent River, MD; Engaged with VX-23, UX-24 and VX-1 to test, train and develop operational and maintenance procedures for the MQ-25 Stingray. To relocate to NAVBASE Ventura County Point Mugu, CA by 2026 to begin operations as an FRS

=== US Marine Corps ===
Insignia	Squadron Designation	Current Aircraft	Marine Aircraft Group	Station
	HMHT-302	CH-53E Super Stallion; CH-53K King Stallion	MAG-29	MCAS New River, NC
	HMLAT-303	Bell UH-1Y Venom; Bell AH-1Z Viper	MAG-39	MCAS Camp Pendleton, CA
	VMMT-204	MV-22B Osprey	MAG-26	MCAS New River, NC
	VMFAT-501	F-35B Lightning II	MAG-31	MCAS Beaufort, SC
	VMFAT-502	F-35B Lightning II	MAG-11	MCAS Miramar, CA
	VMUT-2	MQ-9A Reaper	MAG-14	MCAS Cherry Point, NC

== Disestablished, Deactivated, Re-designated or otherwise former Fleet Replacement Squadrons ==
Beginning 1 April 1958 the Navy organized the training squadrons for its carrier based aircraft into Readiness Carrier Air Groups (RCVG) (later renamed Readiness Carrier Air Wings (RCVW)) or Readiness Anti-Submarine Carrier Air Groups (RCVSG). The training squadrons for non-carrier based aircraft operated separately from the RCVGs/RCVWs and RCVSGs. While most squadrons listed below were dedicated Fleet Replacement Squadrons, some such as VAQ-33, VAQ-130, HC-1, HC-2 and HC-16 operated a department which performed as an FRS while the remainder of the squadron performed operational or other fleet support functions. The tables below list the former Fleet Replacement Squadrons of the U.S Navy and U.S. Marine Corps.

=== Squadrons of former Readiness Carrier Air Group FOUR (RCVG-4)/Readiness Carrier Air Wing FOUR (RCVW-4) ===
On 1 April 1958 Carrier Air Group FOUR (tail code AD) was re-tasked as the Atlantic Fleet's training air group and it was redesignated Readiness Carrier Air Group FOUR (RCVG-4). On 20 December 1963 all Carrier Air Groups were redesignated as Carrier Air Wings and RCVG-4 became Readiness Carrier Air Wing FOUR (RCVW-4). RCVW-4 was disestablished on 1 June 1970 and its squadrons were placed under the control of the respective Type Wing for each squadron's aircraft. The squadrons of the disestablished RCVW-4 retained the AD tail code after their realignment to their Type Wings.

Insignia	Squadron Designation	Squadron Lineage	Aircraft	Notes
	VF-101 (Grim Reapers)	VF-101: 1 May 1952 – 1 May 2012 (inactive 30 Sep 2005 – 1 May 2012); VFA-101: 1 May 2012 – 1 Jul 2019 (inactive 1 Jul 2019–present)	F4D Skyray; F3H Demon; F-4 Phantom II; F-14 Tomcat	NAS Oceana; VF FRS from Apr 1958 to deactivation Deactivated then later Reactivated and Redesignated VFA-101
	VF-174 (Hellrazors)	VB-81: 1 Mar 1944-15 Nov 1946; VA-13A: 15 Nov 1946-2 Aug 1948; VA-134(1st): 2 Aug 1948-15 Feb 1950; VF-174: 15 Feb 1950 – 1 Jul 1966; VA-174(2nd): 1 Jul 1966 – 30 Jun 1988	F8U/F-8 Crusader	NAS Cecil Field; VF FRS from 1 May 1958 to redesignation Redesignated VA-174 1 Jul 1966
	VA-174 (Hellrazors)	VB-81: 1 Mar 1944-15 Nov 1946; VA-13A: 15 Nov 1946-2 Aug 1948; VA-134(1st): 2 Aug 1948-15 Feb 1950; VF-174: 15 Feb 1950-1 Jul 1966; VA-174(2nd): 1 Jul 1966 – 30 Jun 1988	A-7 Corsair II	NAS Cecil Field; VA FRS from redesignation to disestablishment Disestablished 30 Jun 1988
(1992)	VA-42 (Green Pawns) (Thunderbolts) - 1992	VF-42(4th): 1 Sep 1950-1 Nov 1953; VA-42: 1 Nov 1953 – 30 Sep 1994	AD/A-1 Skyraider; A-6 Intruder	NAS Oceana; FRS from 24 Oct 1958 to disestablishment Disestablished 30 Sep 1994
	VA-43 (Challengers)	VF-74A: 1 May 1945-1 Aug 1945; VF-74(2nd): 1 Aug 1945-15 Nov 1946; VF-1B(3rd): 15 Nov 1946-1 Sep 1948; VF-21(2nd): 1 Sep 1948-1 Jul 1959; VA-43: 1 Jul 1959 – 1 Jun 1973; VF-43(5th): 1 Jun 1973 – 1 Jul 1994	A4D/A-4 Skyhawk	NAS Oceana; FRS from 1 Jul 1959 to redesignation Redesignated VF-43 1 Jun 1973
	VA-44 (Hornets)	VF-44(2nd): 1 Sep 1950-1 Jan 1956; VA-44(2nd): 1 Jan 1956 – 1 May 1970	AD/A-1 Skyraider; A4D/A-4 Skyhawk	NAS Jacksonville; NAS Cecil Field; FRS from 1 Jun 1958 to disestablishment Disestablished 1 May 1970
	VA-45 (Blackbirds)	VA-45(3rd): 15 Feb 1963 – 7 Feb 1985; VF-45(2nd): 7 Feb 1985 – 31 Mar 1996	A-1 Skyraider	NAS Cecil Field; FRS from Feb 1963 to retirement of the A-1 (Split out of VA-44 to continue A-1 training to allow VA-44 to conduct A-4 only training). Flew the A-4 as an adversary squadron after retirement of the A-1 until redesignation Redesignated VF-45 7 Feb 1985
	VAH-3; RVAH-3 (Sea Dragons)	VAH-3: 14 Jun 1956 – 1 Jul 1964; RVAH-3: 1 Jul 1964 – 17 Aug 1979	VAH-3: A3D/A-3 Skywarrior; A3J/A-5 Vigilante; RVAH-3: RA-5C Vigilante	NAS Sanford, FL; NAS Albany, GA; NAS Key West; FRS from mid 1958 to disestablishment Distesablished 17 Aug 1979
	RVAW-120; Grey Hawks	RVAW-120: 1 Jul 1967 – 1 May 1983; VAW-120: 1 May 1983 – present	E-1 Tracer; E-2 Hawkeye	NAS Norfolk; FRS from establishment to present Redesignated VAW-120

=== Squadrons of former Readiness Carrier Air Group TWELVE (RCVG-12)/Readiness Carrier Air Wing TWELVE (RCVW-12) ===
On 1 April 1958 Carrier Air Group TWELVE (tail code NJ) was re-tasked as the Pacific Fleet's training air group and it was redesignated Readiness Carrier Air Group TWELVE (RCVG-12). On 20 December 1963 all Carrier Air Groups were redesignated as Carrier Air Wings and RCVG-12 became Readiness Carrier Air Wing TWELVE (RCVW-12). RCVW-12 was disestablished on 30 June 1970 and its squadrons were placed under the control of the respective Type Wing for each squadron's aircraft. The squadrons of the disestablished RCVW-12 retained the NJ tail code after their realignment to their Type Wings.

Insignia	Squadron Designation	Squadron Lineage	Aircraft	Notes
	VF-121 (Pacemakers)	VF-781: 1950-4 Feb 1953; VF-121: 4 Feb 1953 – 30 Sep 1980	F3H-2N Demon; F11F-1 Tiger; F-4 Phantom II	NAS North Island; NAS Miramar; FRS from Apr 1958 to disestablishment Disestablished 30 Sep 1980
	VA-122 (Flying Eagles)	VC-35(2nd): 25 May 1950-1 Jul 1956; VA(AW)-35: 1 Jul 1956-29 Jun 1959; VA-122: 29 Jun 1959 – 31 May 1991	AD/A-1 Skyraider; A-7 Corsair II	NAS Lemoore; FRS from 29 Jun 1959 to disestablishment Disestablished 31 May 1991
	VAH-123 (Pros)	Heavy Attack; Training Unit Pacific: 15 Jun 1957-29 Jun 1959; VAH-123: 29 Jun 1959 – 1 Feb 1971	A3D/A-3 Skywarrior; A-6 Intruder	NAS Whidbey Island; FRS from 15 Jun 1957 to disestablishment Disestablished 1 Feb 1971
	VF-124(2nd) (Gunfighters)	VF-53(2nd): 16 Aug 1948-11 Apr 1958; VF-124(2nd): 11 Apr 1958 – 30 Sep 1994	F8U/F-8 Crusader; F-14 Tomcat	NAS Miramar; FRS from 11 Apr 1958 to disestablishment Disestablished 30 Sep 1994
	VA-125(2nd) (Rough Raiders)	VA-26: 30 Jun 1956-11 Apr 1958; VA-125(2nd): 11 Apr 1958 – 1 Oct 1977	A4D/A-4 Skyhawk; A-7 Corsair II	NAS Lemoore; FRS from 11 Apr 1958 to disestablishment Disestablished 1 Oct 1977
	VA-126 (Nulli Secondus)	VA-126: 6 Apr 1956 – 15 Oct 1965; VF-126: 15 Oct 1965 – 1 Apr 1994	F9F-8T/TF-9J Cougar; A4D/A-4 Skyhawk	NAS Miramar; FRS from 6 Apr 1956 to redesignation Redesignated VF-126 15 Oct 1963
	VA-127 (Royal Blues)	VA-127: 15 Jun 1962 – 1 Mar 1987; VFA-127: 1 Mar 1987 – 23 Mar 1996	F9F-8T/TF-9J Cougar; TA-4 Skyhawk	NAS Lemoore; FRS from 15 Jun 1962 to 1975; Redesignated VFA-127 1 Mar 1987
	VA-128 (Golden Intruders)	VA-128: 1 Sep 1967 – 29 Sep 1995	A-6 Intruder	NAS Whidbey Island; FRS from 1 Sep 1967 to disestablishment Disestablished Sep 1995
	RVAW-110; VAW-110 (Firebirds)	RVAW-110: 20 Apr 1967-May 1983; VAW-110: May 1983-1 Sep 1994	E-1 Tracer; E-2 Hawkeye	NAS Miramar; FRS from 20 Apr 1967 to disestablishment Disestablished Sep 1994

=== Squadrons of former Readiness Antisubmarine Carrier Air Group FIFTY (RCVSG-50) ===
On 30 June 1960 Readiness Antisubmarine Carrier Air Group FIFTY (tail code AR) was established as a training air group to support the Atlantic Fleet's newly establishing Antisubmarine Carrier Air Groups which were being paired with the Navy's Antisubmarine Aircraft Carriers (CVS). The CVSs were re-purposed WWII Essex class carriers to respond to the growing Soviet submarine threat. RCVSG-50 was disestablished in February 1971 and its squadrons were placed under the control of the respective Type Wing for each squadron's aircraft. The squadrons of the disestablished RCVSG-50 retained the AR tail code after their realignment to their Type Wings.

Insignia	Squadron Designation	Squadron Lineage	Aircraft	Notes
	HS-1 (Sea Horses)	HS-1: 3 Oct 1951 – 30 Jun 1997	HSS-1/SH-34 Seabat; HSS-2/SH-3 Sea King; SH-60F Seahawk	NAS Jacksonville; FRS from 30 Sep 1960 to disestablishment Disestablished 30 Jun 1997
	VS-30 (Diamond Cutters)	VS-801: 9 Apr 1951-4 Feb 1953; VS-30: 4 Feb 1953 – 20 Apr 2007 (inactive 20 Apr 2007–present)	S2F-1/S-2 Tracker	NAS Cecil Field; FRS from Jun 1960 to Apr 1976; Deactivated 20 Apr 2007 (official); Deactivation ceremony was 9 Dec 2005

=== Squadrons of former Readiness Antisubmarine Carrier Air Group FIFTY ONE (RCVSG-51) ===
On 30 June 1960 Readiness Antisubmarine Carrier Air Group FIFTY ONE (tail code RA) was established as a training air group to support the Pacific Fleet's newly establishing Antisubmarine Carrier Air Groups. It was disestablished 30 June 1970 and its squadrons were placed under the control of the respective Type Wing for each squadron's aircraft. The squadrons of the disestablished RCVSG-50 retained the RA tail code after their realignment to their Type Wings.

Insignia	Squadron Designation	Squadron Lineage	Aircraft	Notes
	HS-10 (Task Masters) (Warhawks) - 1990s	HS-10: 1 July 1960 – 12 Jul 2012 (inactive 12 Jul 2012–present)	HSS-1/SH-34 Seabat; HSS-2/SH-3 Sea King; SH-60F Seahawk	NAS North Island; FRS from 1 Jul 1960 to deactivation Deactivated 12 Jun 2012
	VS-41 (Shamrocks)	VS-41: 30 June 1960 – 30 Sep 2006 (inactive 30 Sep 2006–present)	S2F-1/S-2 Tracker; S-3 Viking	NAS North Island; FRS from 30 Jun 1960 to deactivation Deactivated 30 Sep 2006

=== Other Former U.S. Navy Fleet Replacement Squadrons ===
The Fleet Replacement Squadrons below were training squadrons for non-carrier based aircraft or were retasked, established or reactivated as Fleet Replacement Squadrons after the disestablishment of RCVW-4, RCVW-12, RCVSG-50 and RCVSG-51 in 1970 and 1971.

Insignia	Squadron Designation	Squadron Lineage	Aircraft	Notes
	VFA-101 (Grim Reapers)	VF-101: 1 May 1952 – 1 May 2012 (inactive 30 Sep 2005 – 1 May 2012); VFA-101: 1 May 2012 – 1 July 2019 (inactive 1 July 2019 – present)	F-35C Lightning II	Eglin Air Force Base, FL; Established 1 May 1952 as VF-101, became an FRS in 1958. Deactivated on 30 Sep 2005 as a Tomcat FRS and reactivated as a F-35C FRS on 1 May 2012. Deactivated a second time (as an F-35C FRS) on 1 Jul 2019
	VF-171(2nd) (Aces)	VF-171(2nd): 8 Aug 1977 – 1 Jun 1984	F-4 Phantom II	NAS Oceana; VF FRS from Aug 1977 to disestablishment Disestablished 1 Jun 1984 (Split out of VF-101 to continue F-4 training when VF-101 began F-14 training)
	VP-31(2nd) (Genies) (Black Lightnings) - 1971	VP-31(2nd): 30 Jun 1960 – 1 Nov 1993	P2V/P-2 Neptune; P5M/P-5 Marlin; R5D/C-54 Skymaster; R7V/C-121 Constellation; UF-1/U-16 Albatross; P-3 Orion	NAS Moffett Field; FRS from 30 Jun 1960 to disestablishment Disestablished 1 Nov 1993
	VAQ-130 (Zappers)	VAW-13: 1 Sep 1959-1 Oct 1968; VAQ-130: 1 Oct 1968–present	A-3 Skywarrior	NAS Alameda; FRS from 1971 to 1974; Assumed A-3 FRS responsibilities from VAH-123 upon its disestablishment until VAQ-130's transition to the EA-6B; Still exists, however not as an FRS
	VAQ-33 (Nighthawks) (Firebirds) - 1970	VC-33(2nd): 31 May 1949-2 Jul 1956; VA(AW)-33: 2 Jul 1956-30 Jan 1959; VAW-33: 30 Jan 1959-1 Feb 1968; VAQ-33: 1 Feb 1968 – 1 Oct 1993	A-3 Skywarrior	NS Norfolk; NAS Oceana; NAS Key West; FRS from 1977 to 1991; Distesablished 1 Oct 1993
	VS-27 (Sea Wolves)	VS-27: 22 Jan 1987 – 30 Sep 1994	S-3A Viking	NAS Cecil Field; FRS from 22 Jan 1987 to disestablishment Disestablished 30 Sep 1994
	HSL-30 (Neptune's Horsemen)	HU-4: 1 July 1960 – 4 July 1965; HC-4(1st): 4 July 1965-Mar 1972; HSL-30: Mar 1972-30 Sep 1993	HH-2 Seasprite; SH-2 Seasprite	NAS Norfolk; FRS from Mar 1972 to disestablishment Disestablished 30 Sep 1993
	HSL-31 (Arch Angels)	HC-5(1st): 1 Sep 1967-Mar 1972; HSL-31: Mar 1972-31 July 1992	HH-2 Seasprite; SH-2 Seasprite	NAS North Island; FRS from Mar 1972 to disestablishment Disestablished 31 Jul 1992
	HSL-40 (Air Wolves)	HSL-40: 4 Oct 1985 – 1 Nov 2009; HSM-40: 1 Nov 2009–present	SH-60B Seahawk	NS Mayport; SH-60B FRS from 4 Oct 1985 to redesignation Redesignated HSM-40
	HSL-41 (Sea Hawks)	HSL-41: 21 Jan 1983 – 8 Dec 2005; HSM-41: 8 Dec 2005–present	SH-60B Seahawk	NAS North Island; SH-60B FRS from 1 Jan 1983 to redesignation Redesignated HSM-41
	HM-12(1st) (Sea Dragons)	HM-12(1st): 1 Apr 1971 – 30 Sep 1994	RH-53D Sea Stallion; CH-53E Super Stallion, MH-53E Sea Dragon	NAS Norfolk; FRS from Apr 1971 to disestablishment Disestablished 30 Sep 1994
	AWSTS	Airborne Mine Countermeasures Weapon Systems Training School (AWSTS): 1 Oct 1994 – 1 Oct 2015; HM-12(2nd): 1 Oct 2015–present	MH-53E Sea Dragon	NAS Norfolk; A "FRS" from 1 Oct 1994 to redesignation Conducted classroom and simulator training for replacement aircrew in conjunction with on aircraft training at HMT-302 until Jan 2001, then at HM-14; Redesignated HM-12(2nd) 1 Oct 2015
	HM-12(2nd) (Sea Dragons)	AWSTS: 1 Oct 1994-1 Oct 2015; HM-12(2nd): 1 Oct 2015–31 Jul 2025	MH-53E Sea Dragon	NS Norfolk, VA; Established from Airborne Mine Countermeasures Weapon Systems Training School on 1 Oct 2015 as an FRS. Deactivated 31 July 2025
	HC-1 (Fleet Angels)	HU-1: 1 Apr 1948-4 Jul 1965; HC-1: 4 Jul 1965 – 29 Apr 1994	UH-3 Sea King	NAS North Island; H-3 FRS from Jun 1989 to Mar 1993; Disestablished 29 Apr 1994
	HC-2(2nd) (Fleet Angels)	HC-2(2nd): 1 Apr 1987 – 1 Jan 2006; HSC-2: 1 Jan 2006–present	UH-3 Sea King	NAS Norfolk; H-3 FRS from 1997 to redesignation Redesignated HSC-2
	HC-3 (Packrats)	HC-3: 1 Sep 1967 – 1 Apr 2005; HSC-3: 1 Apr 2005–present	H-46 Sea Knight	NAS North Island; H-46 FRS from Feb 1982 to redesignation Redesignated HSC-3
	HC-16 (Bullfrogs)	HCT-16: 1 Nov 1974-May 1977; HC-16: May 1977-1 Apr 1994	H-46 Sea Knight; H-1N Huey	NAS Pensacola; FRS Jun 1977 to disestablishment Disestablished 1 Apr 1994

=== Former U.S. Marine Corps Fleet Replacement Squadrons ===
Insignia	Squadron Designation	Squadron Lineage	Aircraft	Notes
	VMGRT-253		KC-130 Hercules	MCAS Cherry Point; FRS from 1 Oct 1986 to deactivation Deactivated 14 Sep 2006
	VMAQT-1		EA-6B Prowler	MCAS Cherry Point; FRS from 2013 to deactivation Deactivated Apr 2016
	HMMT-164		CH-46 Sea Knight	MCAS Camp Pendleton; FRS from Feb 1999 to redesignation Redesignated VMM-164
	HMMT-301			Redesignated HMT-301
	HMT-301 (Wind Talkers)			Deactivated 3 Jun 2005
	HMMT-302			Redesignated HMT-302
	HMT-302 (Phoenix)			Redesignated HMHT-302 in 2010

== See also ==
- List of active United States Marine Corps aircraft squadrons
- List of inactive United States Marine Corps aircraft squadrons
- List of United States Navy aircraft squadrons
- List of inactive United States Navy aircraft squadrons
- List of United States Navy aircraft wings
