= Michael J. Williams (general) =

United States Marine Corps general

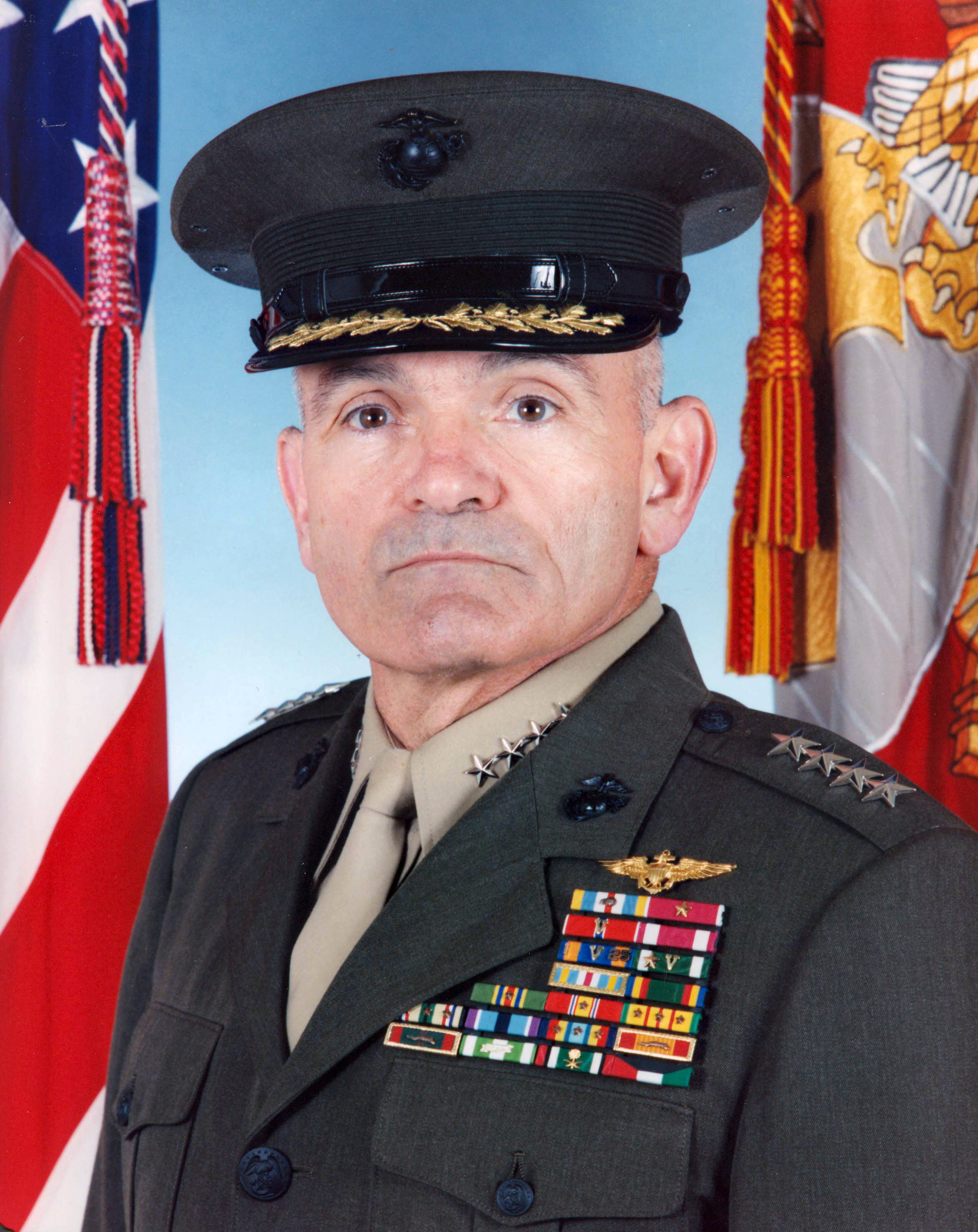
- General Michael J. Williams
- Born: July 12, 1943 (age 83); Baltimore, Maryland, U.S.
- Died: {Dec 6 2025
- Military career
- Allegiance: United States of America
- Branch: United States Marine Corps
- Service years: 1960–1967 (USN); 1967–2002 (USMC)
- Rank: General
- Commands: HMT-301; MAG-26; 2nd FSSG; Joint Task Force 160; Marine Corps Systems Command; Assistant Commandant of the Marine Corps
- Awards: Defense Superior Service Medal (2); Legion of Merit (2); Bronze Star

Michael J. Williams (July 12, 1943 – December 6, 2025) is a retired United States Marine Corps 4-star general. He served as Assistant Commandant of the Marine Corps from 2000 until his retirement in 2002.

== Biography ==
Michael Joel Williams was born in Baltimore, Maryland, on July 12, 1943. He enlisted in the United States Navy in 1960 and was commissioned a second lieutenant upon graduation from the U.S. Naval Academy with a Bachelor of Science degree in June 1967. He also holds master's degrees from the University of Southern California (1974) and the College of Naval Warfare. He was promoted to first lieutenant on September 7, 1968, and upon completion of Naval Flight Training at Pensacola, Florida, he was designated a Naval Aviator in February 1969.

Promoted to captain on February 1, 1971, Williams served operational tours in both the continental United States and the Republic of Vietnam before being ordered to the Marine Corps Amphibious Warfare School, Quantico, Virginia, in 1973. Upon graduation in June 1974, he served on Okinawa, Japan with the 1st Marine Aircraft Wing. Returning to the United States in the summer of 1975, Capt Williams joined Marine Helicopter Squadron 1 at Quantico. There, he was designated a presidential helicopter pilot while serving in various positions with the squadron. He was promoted to major on August 1, 1977, and in July 1978, he was selected to attend the Marine Corps Command and Staff College, Quantico.

Following graduation in June 1979, Maj Williams was ordered to the U.S. Naval Academy at Annapolis, Maryland, where he served as a company officer and executive assistant to the Commandant of Midshipmen. He transferred to the 3rd Marine Aircraft Wing, El Toro, California in July 1982, for duty as executive officer of Headquarters and Maintenance Squadron 16, and later as commanding officer of Marine Helicopter Training Squadron 301. He was promoted to lieutenant colonel on October 1, 1982.

From June 1984 until June 1985, LtCol Williams attended the Naval War College, Newport, Rhode Island. Following graduation, he was ordered to the 3rd Marine Division on Okinawa, where he served as the Assistant Division G-3. Returning to the states in the summer of 1986, he reported to Headquarters Marine Corps, Washington, D.C., for duty as the Marine Corps Program Development Officer, and later the head of the Program Development Branch, Requirements and Program Division. He was promoted to colonel on October 1, 1988.

In July 1989, Col Williams transferred to the 2nd Marine Aircraft Wing at Cherry Point, North Carolina, as the wing inspector before assuming duty as Marine Aircraft Group 26, executive officer in April 1990. Col Williams then assumed command of Marine Aircraft Group 26 (MAG-26) on July 16, 1990. He deployed the MAG to Saudi Arabia to participate in Operations Desert Shield and Desert Storm, returning to the United States in May 1991.

He was assigned duty as the vice director for operational plans and interoperability, J-7, and vice director, Joint Staff for Military Education, The Joint Staff, in November 1991. While serving in this capacity, he was selected for promotion to brigadier general in December 1991, and advanced to that grade on April 1, 1992. BGen Williams served in that capacity until July 16, 1993, when he assumed command of 2nd Force Service Support Group (2nd FSSG). On June 8, 1994, BGen Williams was appointed commanding general, Joint Task Force 160, a humanitarian relief effort for Haitian and Cuban migrants at Guantanamo Naval Base, Cuba. He resumed command of the 2d FSSG on October 31, 1994. He was advanced to the grade of major general in March 1995 and in July was appointed director of the Marine Corps Staff, Washington, D.C., He assumed assignment on July 23, 1996, as the commander, Marine Corps Systems Command, Quantico. He was promoted to lieutenant general on August 5, 1998. LtGen Williams served as the deputy chief of staff, programs and resources, Headquarters, Marine Corps, Washington, D.C., as his last assignment prior to becoming the assistant commandant.

Lieutenant General Williams became the Assistant Commandant of the Marine Corps on September 8, 2000, and was advanced to the rank of general on November 1, 2000. He served as assistant commandant until September 9, 2002, and retired from active duty in November 2002.

== Personal ==
In the 2024 United States presidential election, Williams endorsed Kamala Harris.

== Awards and decorations ==
General Williams' decorations include:

Naval Aviator Badge
1st Row	Defense Superior Service Medal w/ oak leaf cluster		Legion of Merit w/ 1 award star	Bronze Star w/ valor device
2nd Row	Meritorious Service Medal	Air Medal w/ gold award numeral "1", bronze Strike/Flight numeral "25" & valor device	Navy and Marine Corps Commendation Medal w/ 1 award star & valor device	Joint Meritorious Unit Award
3rd Row	Navy Unit Commendation	Navy Meritorious Unit Commendation w/ 1 service star	National Defense Service Medal w/ 2 service stars	Vietnam Service Medal w/ 3 service stars
4th Row	Southwest Asia Service Medal w/ 3 service stars	Humanitarian Service Medal	Navy Sea Service Deployment Ribbon w/ 3 service stars	Vietnam Gallantry Cross unit citation
5th Row	Vietnam Civil Actions unit citation	Vietnam Campaign Medal	Kuwait Liberation Medal (Saudi Arabia)	Kuwait Liberation Medal (Kuwait)
6th Row	Presidential Service Badge			

== See also ==
- List of United States Marine Corps four-star generals

Military offices
Preceded by Terrence R. Dake	Assistant Commandant of the Marine Corps; 2000-2002	Succeeded by William L. Nyland
