= HM-14 =

Deactivated US Navy helicopter squadron

Helicopter Mine Countermeasures Squadron 14
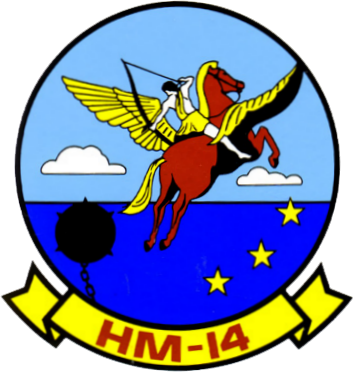
- HM-14 Vanguard Insignia
- Active: 12 May 1978–April 2023
- Country: United States
- Branch: United States Navy
- Part of: Helicopter Sea Combat Wing, US Atlantic Fleet
- Garrison/HQ: Naval Station Norfolk, Virginia
- Nickname: Vanguard
- Motto: The World Famous Vanguard
- Mascot: Red Horse Head
- Engagements: Operation Earnest Will; Gulf War; Operation Shining Hope; Operation Noble Eagle; Operation Enduring Freedom; Iraq War
- Decorations: Humanitarian Service Medal (2); CNO Safety Award (2); Meritorious Unit Commendation (2); Battle Efficiency Award (3); Navy Unit Commendation (3); Combat Action Award; Coast Guard Meritorious Unit Award

Insignia
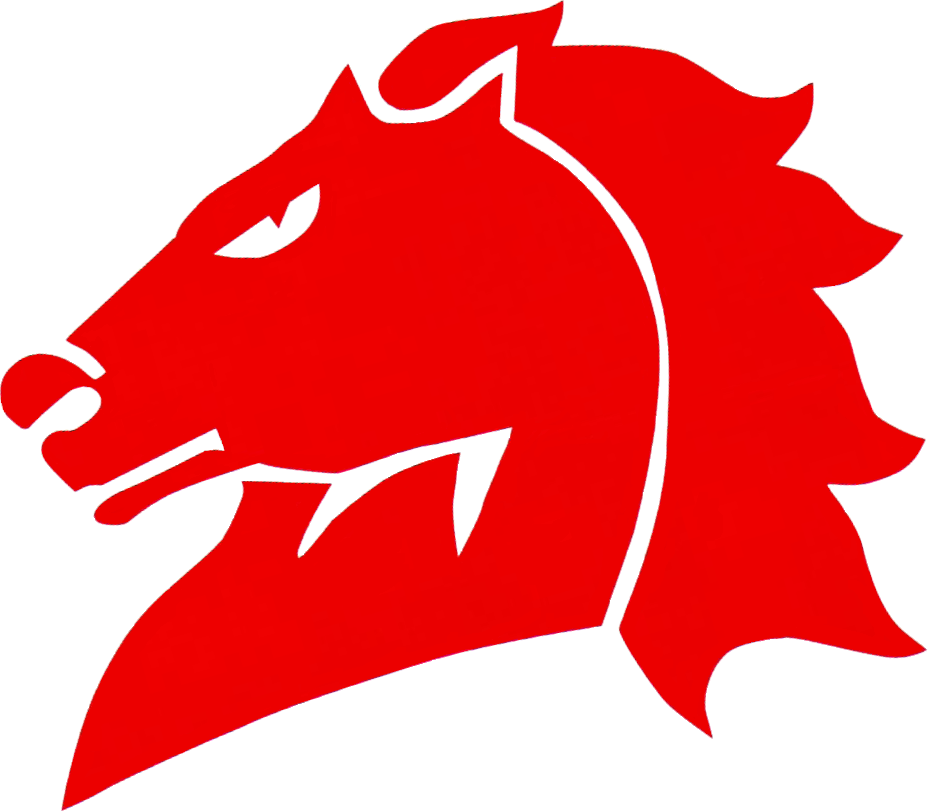
- Mascot

Helicopter Mine Countermeasures Squadron 14 (HM-14) was a United States Navy helicopter squadron established in 1978 based at Naval Station Norfolk, Virginia. Nicknamed the Vanguard and flying the MH-53E Sea Dragon, it comprised both active duty and reserve personnel. It was the sister squadron to HM-15, the Blackhawks, based at NS Norfolk.

HM-14 flew its last mission on 8 December 2022 and was deactivated on 30 March 2023. The squadron was officially disestablished in July 2023. Squadron responsibilities were transferred to HM-15 beginning in January 2023.

== History ==
HM-14 was established at NAS, Norfolk, on 12 May 1978 as the world's first fully self-contained Airborne Mine Countermeasures (AMCM) squadron. The squadron was outfitted with eight RH-53D aircraft from HM-12 and with Vietnam War legacy minesweeping equipment from AMCM Unit Alpha, including five Mk-105 sleds.

=== 1980s ===
In April 1981, the squadron deployed to Europe for 5 1/2 months as the AMCM element of the first integrated MCM Task Group, along with surface and underwater MCM units. They participated in multi-national exercises and demonstrations in several countries to show the capabilities of an AMCM squadron.

In June 1984, HM-14 took delivery of the AN/AQS-14 Mine Hunting Sonar and established the fleet's first operational airborne mine hunting capability.

In August 1984, the squadron responded to a JCS-directed rapid deployment order in support of Operation INTENSE LOOK. HM-14 conducted split site operations with main body of the squadron deploying on the USS Shreveport LPD-12 and Detachment One operating out of Jeddah Saudi Arabia. AMCM operations in the Gulf of Suez were in support of the Egyptian Government, and in the Red Sea in support of the Saudi Arabian Government. During this period, HM-14 also responded to provide vertical onboard delivery (VOD) support following the Beirut embassy annex bombing. For its performance during these operations, the squadron was awarded the Navy Unit Commendation and the Humanitarian Service Medal.

In January 1987, HM-14 deployed five aircraft to Galveston, Texas conducting minehunting/minesweeping operations in support of port breakout exercise FTX Galveston '87 and another detachment deploying three aircraft to Howard Air Force Base Republic of Panama, in support of exercise Kindle Liberty '87.

In August 1987, the Squadron executed another JCS-directed rapid deployment order operating off the USS Guadalcanal (LPH-7) and USS Okinawa (LPH-3) in the Persian Gulf as part of Operation Earnest Will. During these operations, HM-14 was credited with the first live moored mines swept by a U.S. Navy unit since the Korean Conflict. As a result of superb performance in the hostile and extremely demanding environment of the Persian Gulf, HM-14 received the Navy Unit Commendation.

The squadron received its first MH-53 Sea Dragon E-model helicopter on 9 April 1989. A variant of the CH-53E, this model was the first aircraft designed specifically for AMCM. The MH-53E includes Precision Navigation System for minefield navigation, a dedicated hydraulic system for MCM operations, and a greater fuel capacity for extended on-station time while conducting sweeps.

=== 1990s ===
In October 1990, HM-14 Detachment One forward deployed in support of Operation Desert Shield, becoming the first U.S. Navy squadron to do so. With six aircraft, 300 personnel, and all associated support equipment, this was the largest detachment in community history. The squadron set up a forward operating presence in Abu Dhabi, UAE, at the Sheikh Zayed MCM Base Abu Dhabi (SZMBAD) from which they provided AMCM coverage of the entire Persian Gulf in coordination with the surface MCM Fleet under COMUSMCMGRU.

In January 1992, six containers of arsenic were swept overboard from a freighter during a severe storm off the coast of New Jersey. HM-14 self-lifted to New Jersey to support the U.S. Coast Guard in searching for the containers during Operation Toxic Look. HM-14 swept over 305 linear miles using the AQS-14 sonar system before finding all six containers and preventing an ecological disaster. The detachment was awarded the Coast Guard Meritorious Unit Award for this action.

In 1995, HM-14 was integrated with USNR sister squadron HM-18. Following fellow squadrons HM-15 and HM-19 as the first squadrons to integrate active and reserve elements into a single squadron, over 200 personnel from HM-18 boosted the manning of HM-14 to almost 700, making it one of the largest operational squadrons in the U.S. Navy. Regular Navy, Temporary Active Reserve (now FTS), and Selected Reserve pilots, aircrew, maintenance and administrative personnel deploy and work side by side with no distinction made between them.

In 1999, HM-14 established the first permanent AMCM detachment in Manama, Bahrain. They maintained this detachment until 2003, when it was turned over to sister squadron HM-15. During this time, HM-14 Det One participated in numerous exercises, logistics and AMCM support of Operation Iraqi Freedom and routine AMCM training.

=== 2000s ===
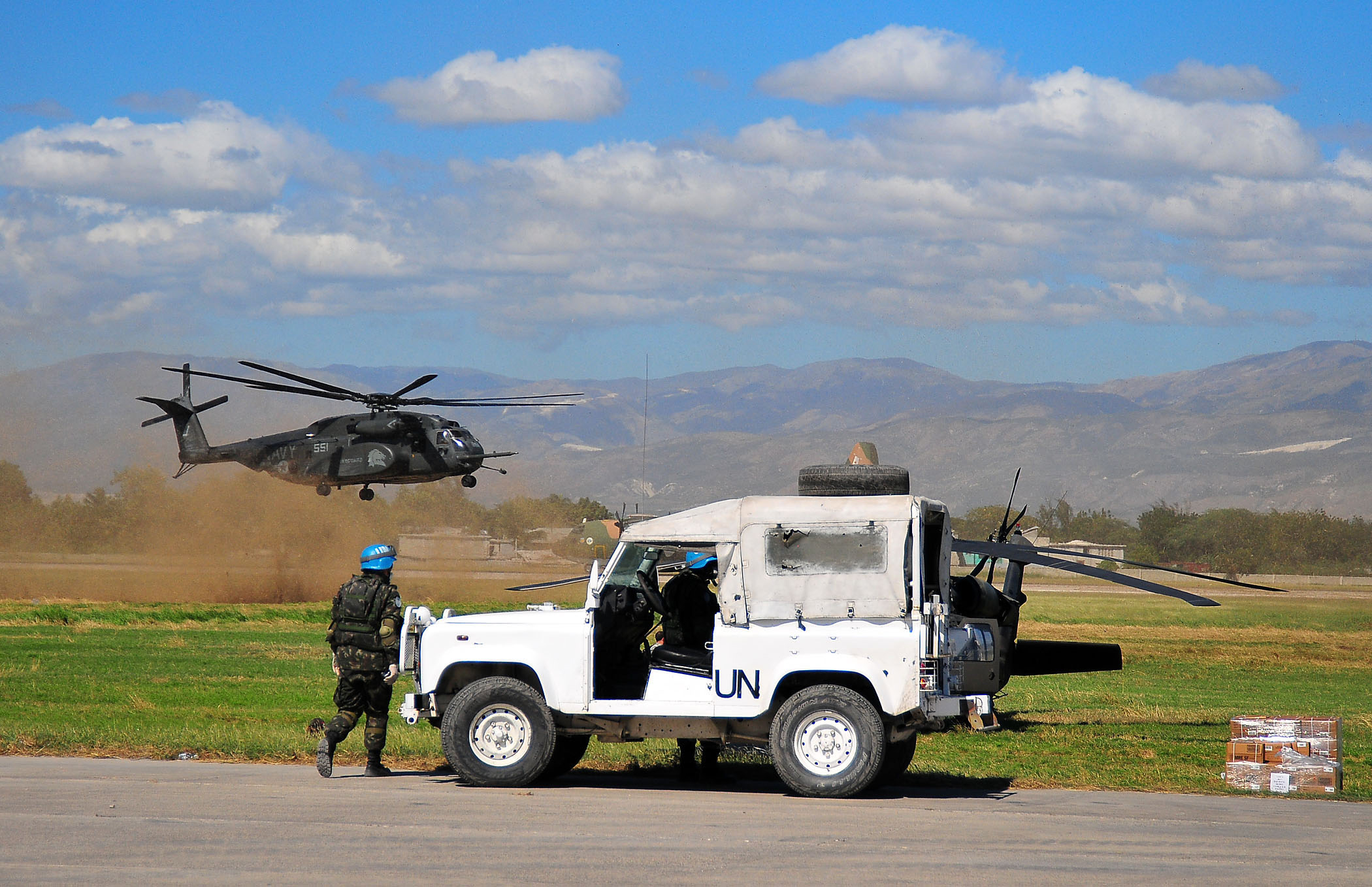
MINUSTAH troops meet a relief flight from HM-14 as part of relief operations after the 2010 Haiti earthquake

In 2001, HM-14 took over the flight training of Fleet Replacement Pilots and Aircrew from HMT-302. While the Airborne Mine Countermeasures Weapon Systems Training School (AWSTS) in Norfolk conducts all ground training of student pilots and aircrew, HM-14 maintains the aircraft that are used for their training.

At the beginning of the 2003 invasion of Iraq, a detachment from HM-14 along with Naval Special Clearance Team ONE de-mined the waterway leading into the port of Umm Qasr, reopening the port to serve an important role in the shipment of humanitarian supplies to Iraqi civilians.

From 2005 to 2007, HM-14 participated in numerous operations worldwide, including Operation New Horizon in Haiti, Joint Task Force Katrina in Louisiana, Joint Task Force Lebanon, and two presidential visits to Mexico and Uruguay. They used the capabilities of the MH-53E helicopters to provide heavy lift logistical support for cargo and personnel movement. In 2007 and 2008, HM-14 participated in the humanitarian missions Pacific Partnership and Continuing Promise aboard USS Peleliu and USS Boxer respectively. These extended operations went to multiple countries in the Eastern Pacific and Western Pacific areas, providing medical services and Seabee support to impoverished areas.

In September 2007, HM-14 established the community's second permanent detachment, this time at MCAS Iwakuni, Japan. This detachment provided 7th Fleet with a forward-deployed AMCM and heavy-lift asset to parallel HM-15 Det Two in Manama, Bahrain. The location in Iwakuni also allowed for sharing of assets and training with the Japan Maritime Self-Defense Force squadron HM-111, the only dedicated AMCM squadron outside of the United States and the only other squadron in the world that flies the MH-53E.

In October 2008, HM-14 DET 1 MCAS Iwakuni, Japan relocated to Pohang, Korea continuing to provide the 7th Fleet with AMCM and heavy-lift support and performs operations in multiple countries in the Eastern Pacific.

== Operations and Organization ==
HM-14's mission was to stand ready to deploy anywhere in the world within 72 hours via US Air Force C-5 Galaxy to provide airborne mine countermeasures and vertical onboard delivery support. Additionally, humanitarian and disaster relief tasking had been increasing in recent years. Recognizing the capabilities of the MH-53E, the squadron did also provide platforms for United States Navy EOD and Force Recon paratroopers.

The squadron had 17 MH-53E Sea Dragon aircraft and 700 total members including pilots, aircrew, maintainers, and administrative personnel. The squadron had all of the typical departments of an aviation squadron, as well as a dedicated AMCM department, responsible for maintaining the minehunting and minesweeping gear and the RHIBs used for tending them.

HM-14 was deactivated and responsiblites transferred to HM-15 beginning in January 2023.

== See also ==
- History of the United States Navy
- List of United States Navy aircraft squadrons
- List of inactive United States Navy aircraft squadrons
