= Airborne Mine Countermeasures Weapon Systems Training School =

US military unit 1994 - 2015

Airborne Mine Countermeasures Weapon Systems Training School (AWSTS)
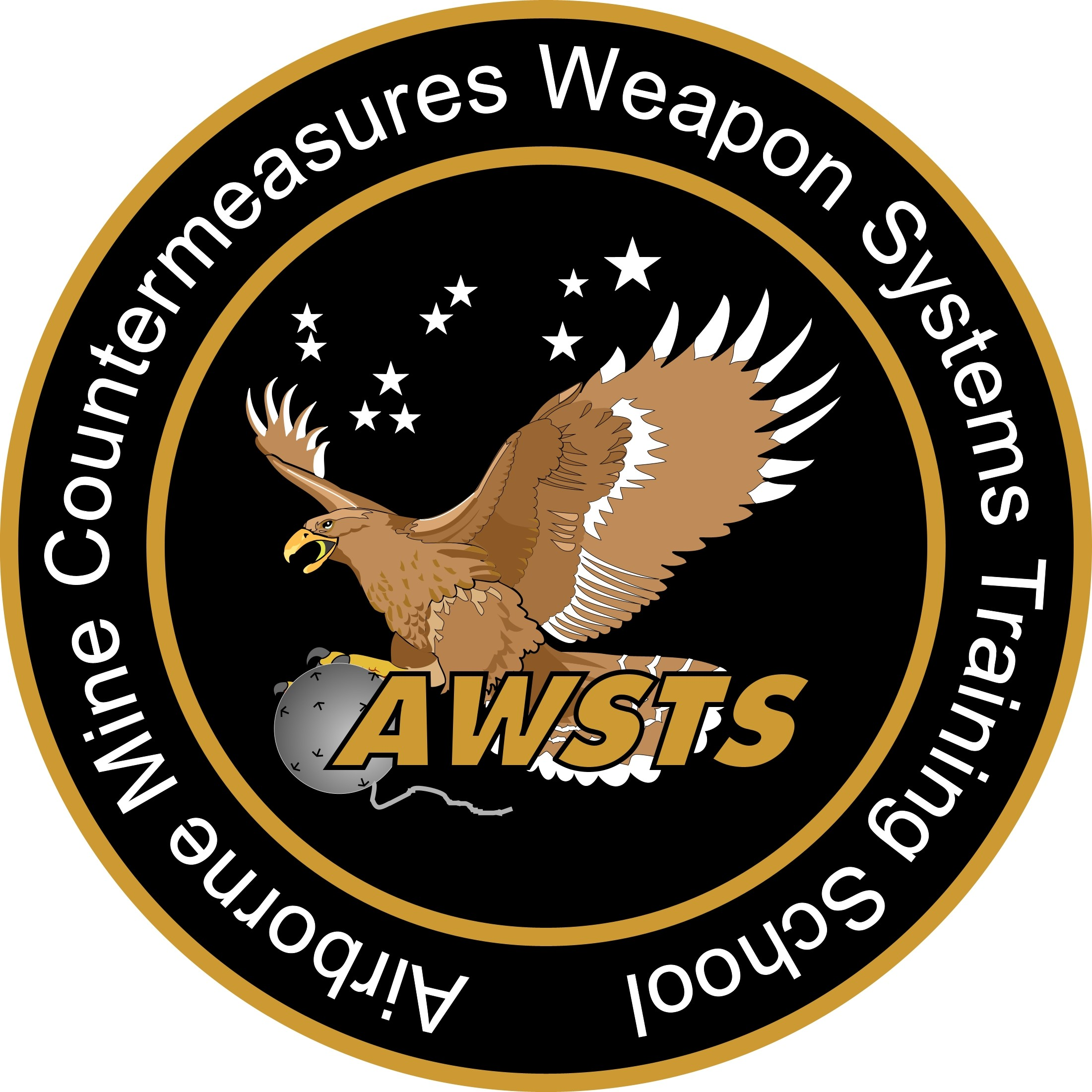
- Active: 1 October 1994 – 1 October 2015
- Country: United States
- Branch: USN
- Type: Training squadron
- Role: Flight training
- Part of: Helicopter Sea Combat Wing, Atlantic Fleet
- Garrison/HQ: Naval Station Norfolk
- Decorations: Commander Theodore G. Ellyson Aviator Production Excellence Award (2003)

Airborne Mine Countermeasures Weapon Systems Training School (AWSTS) was a United States Navy helicopter training squadron stationed at Naval Station Norfolk, Virginia. AWSTS trained newly commissioned Naval Aviators, conversion pilots, refresher pilots, and enlisted aircrew on the MH-53E Sea Dragon and was a part of Helicopter Sea Combat Wing, Atlantic Fleet (HELSEACOMBATWINGLANT).

== Mission ==
Conduct helicopter flight training and initial Mine Countermeasures training for all US Navy MH-53E Sea Dragon pilots and aircrew. All basic, conversion, and refresher pilots as well as aircrew receive training in the MH-53E to prepare them for follow on assignment in the United States Navy.

== History ==
Airborne Mine Countermeasures Weapon Systems Training School (AWSTS) was established 1 October 1994, at Naval Air Station, Norfolk, Virginia and subsequently designated a special mission command in July 1996. Its mission is to provide initial MH-53E Sea Dragon systems and flight training, as well as advanced tactical and weapon systems training to pilots and aircrew of the Airborne Mine Countermeasures and Heavy Combat Support communities.

With an average staff of 11 officers and 23 enlisted personnel, the school was established to fill a void left by the decommissioning of Helicopter Mine Countermeasures Squadron TWELVE (HM-12) and the U.S. Navy's decision to conduct MH-53E training in conjunction with CH-53E Super Stallion training at Marine Helicopter Training Squadron Three Zero Two (HMT-302). Under this reorganization and subsequent refinements, AWSTS assumed duties as MH-53E Course Curriculum Model Manager and responsibility to conduct M-53E pilot and aircrew ground and simulator training for both the familiarization (FAM) and Airborne Mine Countermeasures (AMCM) portions of the MH-53E syllabus using the operational flight trainer (OFT) and the AMCM Stream and Recovery Module (ASRM). HMT-302 was assigned responsibility for MH-53E basic FAM flight training. AMCM flight training was made the responsibility of the individual fleet squadrons. Along with its primary mission, AWSTS also functions as the Model Manager for the MH-53E NATOPS, the AMCM TACAID, and the MH-53E Computer Based Training (CBT) System.

In January 2001, MH-53E flight training returned to Norfolk, VA under a new integrated training concept between AWSTS and Helicopter Mine Countermeasures Squadron FOURTEEN (HM-14). AWSTS assumed all functions of a Fleet Replacement Squadron (FRS) with the exception that HM-14 was assigned responsibility to provide and maintain the aircraft, and augment AWSTS with flight instructors when required.

As the MH-53E FRS, AWSTS provides flight and ground training to student pilots and aircrew through all phases of their Chief of Naval Operations approved syllabus. Prospective HM pilots and aircrew are detailed to AWSTS for over 20 weeks of intensive, computer based MH-53E systems, pre-flight, simulator, and basic flight training. Upon completion of the syllabus, HM pilots and aircrew remain at AWSTS for AMCM systems and simulator training in the OFT and ASRM. Once complete, these pilots and aircrew report to their respective fleet squadrons (HM-14 or HM-15)where they will conduct their first actual AMCM flights. To date, over 600 pilots and aircrew have passed through AWSTS on their way to the fleet.

In summer 2004, AWSTS was awarded the Commander Theodore G. Ellyson Aviator Production Excellence Award for calendar year 2003. The award, similar to the operational Battle “E”, is given to two CNATRA squadrons and three Fleet Replacement Squadrons including one East Coast, one West Coast and one Marine Corps that demonstrated the “greatest production efficiency in training the fleet requirement for pilots, naval flight officers and aircrewmen within the CNO approved syllabus time.” Receiving the Ellyson Award is a tribute to the professionalism, teamwork, dedication, and adherence to safety of the sailors at AWSTS.

AWSTS has defined tactical requirements for MH-53E roles in AMCM, Heavy Lift, and Special Warfare, culminating with the establishment of the CHSCWL Weapons Training Unit and the MH-53E Air combat Tactical Training Continuum. AWSTS has led the fleet in incorporating the Naval Aviator Production Process Improvement (NAPPI) resulting in improved student tracking, reducing the average time to train, and improving the quality of replacement pilots and aircrew sent to the fleet. The Barrier Removal Team established by AWSTS to identify and remove obstacles hindering aircraft availability and hence improve pilot and aircrew production was so successful that it has been used as a model for implementation into other Fleet Replacement Squadrons. Furthermore, AWSTS directed the complete overhaul of five separate MH-53E Navy flight manuals and the development of a comprehensive NTTP Tactical Pocket Guide, promoting the continued improvement of this legacy aircraft and solidifying the role of the MH-53E in the fleet for decades to come.

On 1 October 2015, AWSTS officially became HM-12. The transition helped reaffirm the Navy's commitment to the MH-53E and the HM community by providing the FRS with its own maintenance department, support personnel and bolstered its ability to serve as the HM community leader.
