= HSM-41 =

Helicopter Maritime Strike Squadron 41
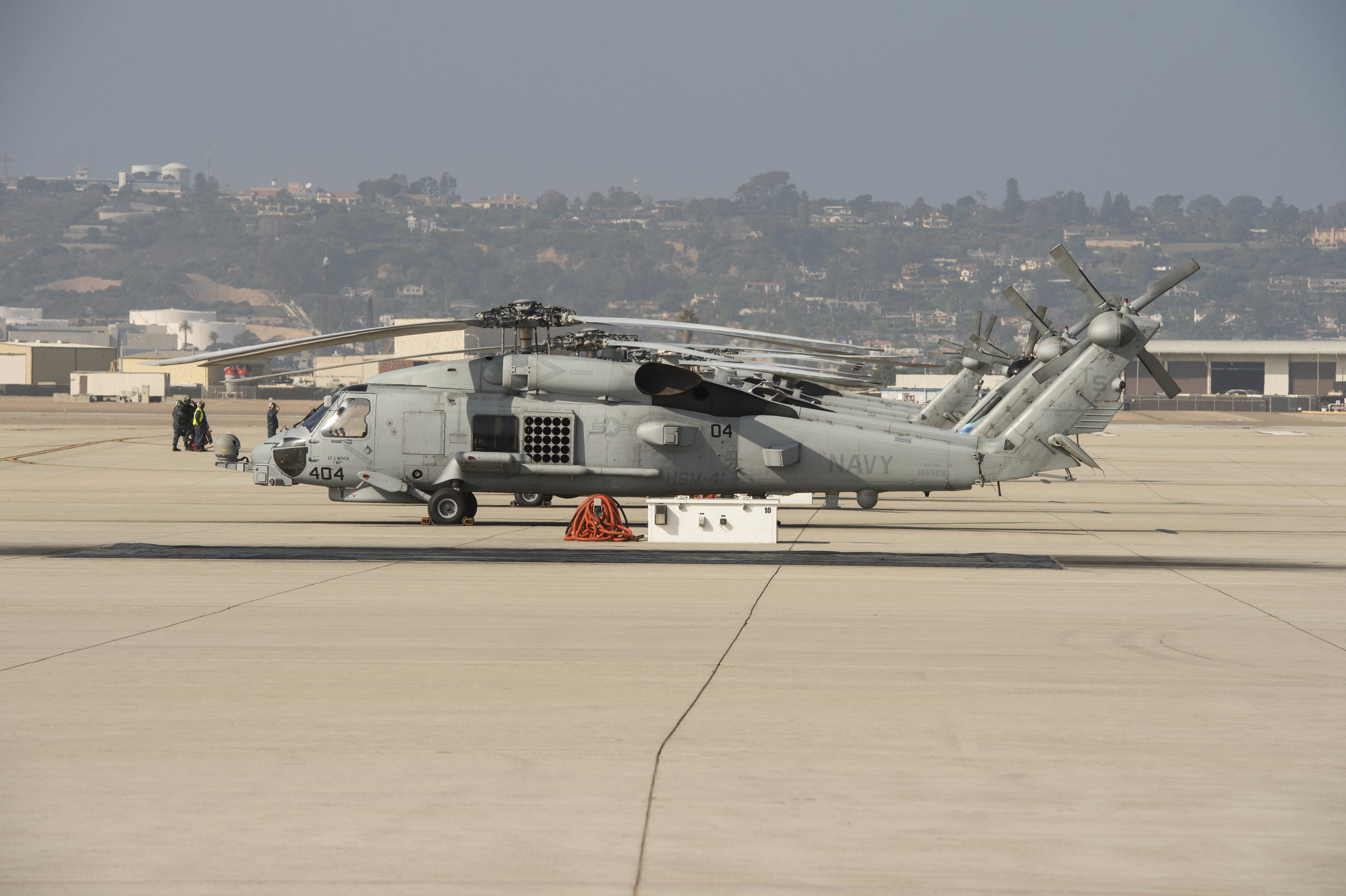
- Helicopters assigned to HSM-41 on the flight line at NAS North Island in 2015
- Active: 21 January 1983 – present
- Country: United States of America
- Branch: United States Navy
- Role: Anti-Submarine Warfare (ASW); Anti-Surface Warfare (ASUW); Vertical Replenishment (VERTREP); Search and Rescue (SAR), Medical Evacuation (MEDEVAC); Naval Gunfire Support (NGFS)
- Garrison/HQ: Naval Air Station North Island
- Nickname: "Seahawks"
- Motto: "Train to Fight-Fight to Win"

Commanders
- Current commander: Tim "Buck" Rogers

Insignia
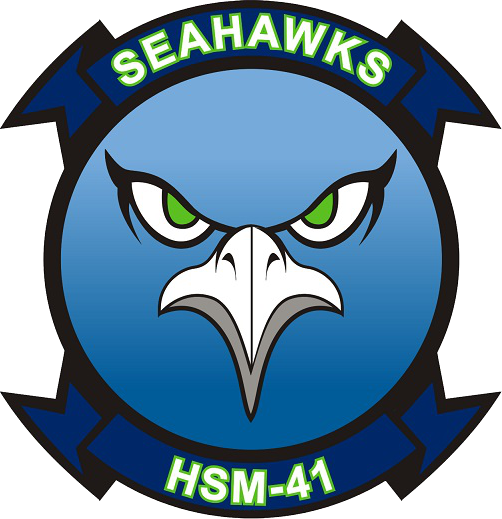
- HSM-41 emblem

Helicopter Maritime Strike Squadron 41 (HSM-41), nicknamed the "Seahawks", is a United States Navy helicopter squadron based at NAS North Island, San Diego, California.

== History ==
Helicopter Maritime Strike Squadron 41 (HSM 41) is the Navy's Fleet Replacement Squadron dedicated to training new MH-60R pilots and aircrew. When commissioned on 21 January 1983, as Helicopter Anti-Submarine Light 41 (HSL-41) it was the Navy's first Light Airborne Multi-Purpose System (LAMPS) MK III squadron and flew the Sikorsky SH-60B helicopter. HSL-41 trained pilots and aircrew for the west coast HSL squadrons in San Diego, Hawaii, and Japan.

The success of West Coast LAMPS detachments in the Pacific Ocean, Indian Ocean, and Persian Gulf is a tribute to the quality of initial and follow-on training that has been the hallmark of HSM 41. As a result, the squadron was awarded the Meritorious Unit Commendation in 1985, 1988, 1991 and 2002.

On 8 December 2006, HSL-41 was re designated from Helicopter Anti-Submarine Squadron Light 41 to Helicopter Maritime Strike Squadron 41. In February 2008, HSM 41 surpassed 140,000 flight hours without a major aircraft incident and celebrated its 25th anniversary. Since 1983, HSM 41 has trained over 3,000 Fleet Replacement Pilots and Aircrew for service in LAMPS MK III and MH-60R fleet squadrons. In 2020, the squadron reached 230,000 flight hours without a major incident.

On 14 March 2013, a helicopter belonging to the squadron made an emergency landing in Chula Vista.

== See also ==
- History of the United States Navy
- List of United States Navy aircraft squadrons
