= HSC-3 =

Helicopter Sea Combat Squadron THREE HELSEACOMBATRON 3 (HSC-3)
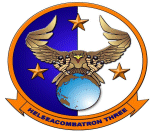
- HSC-3 Merlins Insignia
- Active: 1 September 1967 – present
- Country: United States
- Branch: United States Navy
- Type: Naval helicopter
- Role: Fleet Replacement Squadron
- Size: Squadron
- Nickname: "Merlins"

Commanders
- Commanding Officer: Captain Thomas “Smokey” Butts; NAS North Island

Aircraft flown
- Helicopter: MH-60S Knighthawk

Helicopter Sea Combat Squadron THREE (HELSEACOMBATRON 3 or HSC-3 Merlins) (previously Helicopter Combat Support Squadron THREE (HELSUPPRON 3 or HC-3 Packrats)), is a United States Navy multi-role combat helicopter squadron based at Naval Air Station North Island in San Diego, California, which operates the Sikorsky MH-60S Knighthawk helicopter to train aircrew and support fleet development on the MH-60S for the Commander Helicopter Sea Combat Wing, U.S. Pacific Fleet. The squadron was established on 1 September 1967 at Naval Air Station Imperial Beach with the Boeing Vertol CH-46 Sea Knight to provide vertical replenishment (VERTREP) services on the West Coast, and was redesignated HSC-3 on 1 April 2005.

== History ==
The "Packrats" were originally established as HC-3 on 1 September 1967. They were the Navy's sole vertical replenishment (VERTREP) squadron and operated the CH-46 Sea Knight from supply vessels operated by the Combat Logistics Force (CLF) to carry across supplies from the deck of the supply ship to fleet ships being re-supplied. This greatly increased the speed of underway replenishment operations, particularly when supporting the fleet's aircraft carriers at sea which in turn improved the ability of battle groups to arrive on station sooner and stay there longer. The squadron was soon moved to Naval Air Station North Island in July 1972.

A significant change in the unit's mission came about in 1982 when the squadron became the Navy's single-site Fleet Replenishment Squadron for shipboard landings, VERTREP, SAR, Night Vision Devices (NVDs), tactics and emergency procedures. They would be responsible for training all CH-46 pilots and aircrew on these topics, a role they would continue with until the present day. The next major change for the squadron came in 2002 as the final CH-46 'Phrog' pilots completed training with the squadron and courses on the Navy's brand-new MH-60S ramped up. The first MH-60S student graduated on 26 April 2002 while that September saw the final H-46 crew member complete training. With the new aircraft came a range of new missions and tactics that were covered by the unit and to recognize this, the Navy authorized a new squadron designation for MH-60S units. The "Merlins" were re-designated HSC-3 on 1 April 2005.

HSC-3 administers a number of programs in addition to providing trained pilots and aircrew to the Fleet. As the Model Manager for the Naval Air Training and Operating Procedures Standardization (NATOPS) for the MH-60S, HSC-3 evaluates the NATOPS program of each HSC squadron annually. HSC-3 instructors also train all Pacific Fleet Helicopter Control Officers (HCOs) and Landing Signalman Enlisted (LSEs). Additionally, as the Chief of Naval Operations (CNO) SAR Model Manager, HSC-3 establishes the training and equipment requirements for all naval SAR operations. The unit has 4 out of the Navy's 17 Master Chief Naval Aircrewman (AWCM) where historically there has only been one assigned for the last 30 years.

As a result of the command's concern for all aspects of flight and ground safety, HC-3 safety record combined with HSC-3's celebrated their 250,000th Class A mishap-free flight hour on 14 June 2013 after not suffering an accident since 1973. This record makes HSC-3 the safest operational helicopter squadron in the Navy and has enabled the squadron to win eight Chief of Naval Operations Aviation Safety Awards. This achievement, plus an excellent operational record, brought a fifth consecutive Battle Efficiency Award to HC-3 in 1983. This was the seventh Battle "E" Award presented by Commander Naval Air Forces, U.S. Pacific Fleet to the squadron since its establishment.

During the USS Bonhomme Richard fire that started on 12 July 2020, HSC-3 SCORE DET participated in firefighting efforts, dropping water from the air to help augment firefighting efforts.

== See also ==
- History of the United States Navy
- List of United States Navy aircraft squadrons
