= HS-10 Warhawks =

Helicopter Anti-Submarine Squadron Ten
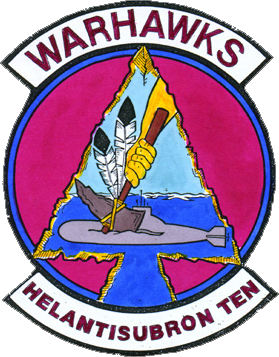
- HS-10 insignia
- Active: 30 June 1960 – 12 July 2012
- Country: United States
- Branch: US Navy
- Type: Anti-submarine warfare
- Role: Fleet Replacement Squadron
- Part of: Helicopter Anti-Submarine Wing, U.S. Pacific Fleet
- Garrison/HQ: Naval Air Station North Island
- Nickname(s): "Taskmasters" "Warhawks"
- Equipment: SH-3A/D/H Sea King; SH-60F Seahawk

Commanders
- Current commander: None, inactive

Helicopter Anti-Submarine Squadron 10 (HS-10) was a United States Navy helicopter anti-submarine squadron based at Naval Air Station North Island, San Diego, California. Helicopter Anti-Submarine Squadron 10 (HS-10, HELANTISUBRON TEN), a shore-based unit of Helicopter Anti-Submarine Wing, U.S. Pacific Fleet, was established on 30 June 1960 at NALF Imperial Beach, California. HS-10 was relocated to Naval Air Station North Island, San Diego, California on 23 December 1976.

HS-10's mission was to indoctrinate and train pilots, aircrew, and maintenance personnel in carrier based rotary-wing anti-submarine warfare (ASW) aircraft. Since its establishment, the squadron trained more than 2,000 pilot, 2,000 aircrew, and 6,450 maintenance personnel in the operation, tactics, and maintenance of Sikorsky SH-3 "Sea King" helicopters. HS-10 closed its chapter on the SH-3H helicopter with more than 70,000 mishap-free flight hours when the last students completed in June 1989. The squadron immediately began operations with the Navy's newest aircraft, the Sikorsky SH-60F "Seahawk," a derivative of the successful Army UH-60 "Blackhawk."

On 1 October 1989, HS-10 assumed the challenge of being the first SH-60F Fleet Replacement Squadron. In 1990, the long-standing squadron nickname of "Taskmasters" was replaced with "Warhawks," illustrating the renewed commitment to training the best and brightest for battle in the newest of "Hawks." HS-10 transitioned eight entire fleet HS squadrons in addition to the normal replacement pilot/aircrew load. Additionally, the Warhawks provided training for Navy Helicopter Combat Squadrons (HCS), U.S. Coast Guard personnel in their initial transition to the HH-60J "Jayhawks," and pilots from Germany's Naval Air Arm.

In addition to providing training support for numerous organizations, HS-10 had a secondary role of Search and Rescue. In its 38-year history, HS-10 successfully completed more than 100 rescues of both civilian and military personnel along the coast of Southern California.

Tactics development and evaluation was a natural role for HS-10, as most of the permanently assigned personnel had significant fleet experience in the ASW and Combat Search and Rescue (CSAR) mission areas. This expertise was instrumental in the development of SH-60F training plans and tactical procedures for the fleet's operational carrier battle groups.

As the armed forces experience a period of downsizing, the capability to effectively operate in the "joint" and "combined" arenas was even more critical. To this end, HS-10 forged ahead with exchange instructor pilots from the U.S. Air Force, Canada, Australia, and Germany.

The U.S. Navy deactivated HS-10 on 12 July 2012.
