= HMT-301 =

Marine Helicopter Training Squadron 301
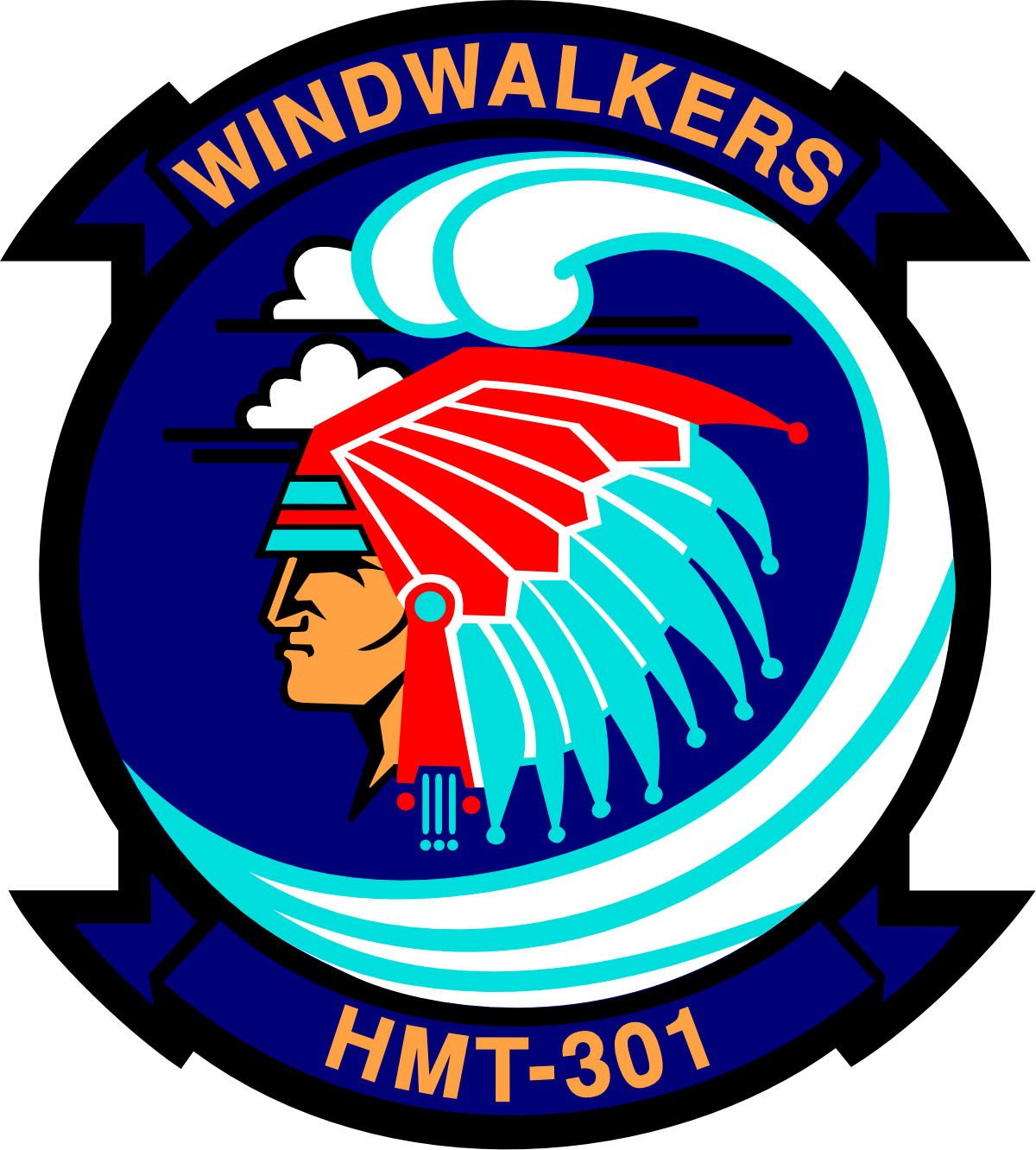
- HMT-301 Unit insignia
- Active: 1 April 1966 – 3 June 2005
- Country: United States
- Branch: USMC
- Type: Training Squadron
- Role: Assault support
- Part of: Deactivated
- Garrison/HQ: Marine Corps Base Hawaii
- Nickname(s): "Windwalkers"
- Tail Code: SU
- Engagements: None

Marine Helicopter Training Squadron 301 (HMT-301), was a United States Marine Corps helicopter training squadron stationed at Marine Corps Base Hawaii. Known as the Windwalkers, HMT-301 was part of Marine Aircraft Group 24 (MAG-24) and 1st Marine Aircraft Wing.

HMT-301 was deactivated by general order in 2005.

== History ==
HMT-301 traces its roots back to 1 April 1966. First activated at MCAS(H) Santa Ana, California, as HMMT-301, the squadron has a long track record of producing fleet ready aviators in aircraft ranging from the UH-34 to the current CH-53D. Aircrew trained at HMT-301 have utilized the core skills learned to serve the United States in conflicts from the Vietnam War to the present-day global war on terrorism.

Originally flying the UH-34 Sea Horse, HMMT-301 was assigned the mission of providing fleet helicopter training to newly designated naval aviators, transition training for fixed wing pilots, and on the job training for enlisted flight crewmembers. By mid-1967, in response to the need for trained helicopter crews for combat duty in Southeast Asia, the number grew to ninety officers and over two hundred enlisted.

25 January 1968 marked the arrival of the Sikorsky CH-53A Sea Stallion helicopter, a heavy-lift capable helicopter, and the re-designation of HMMT-301 as HMHT-301, the Marine Heavy Training Squadron 301. The UH-34 type helicopter retired shortly afterward, once again making the squadron a one-aircraft unit.

Restructuring of Marine Aviation led to the emergence of Marine Helicopter Training Squadron 301 (HMT-301) on 31 March 1972. The newly designated squadron flew both the CH-46 and CH-53A aircraft.

The squadron produced fleet ready aviators in these aircraft for the next ten years. In 1982 the CH-46 D/F models were replaced by the upgraded CH-46E. On 13 December 1983, HMT-301 took delivery of the first of the new Sikorsky CH-53E Super Stallion helicopters. With the activation of the new table of organization, which reflected the addition of the CH-53E and the Fleet Readiness Aviation Maintenance Personnel (FRAMP) program, HMT-301 officially became the largest squadron in the Marine Corps.

HMT-301's sister squadron, HMT-302, was reactivated in November 1987, and 301's CH-53A and CH-53E assets were transferred to HMT-302. HMT-301 was reduced from the largest squadron in the Marine Corps to a relatively small squadron with 10 CH-46E aircraft and 200 personnel. HMT-301 was deactivated at Marine Corps Air Station in Tustin, California. The squadron had successfully trained over 2500 Naval Aircrew, flying four different aircraft for over 130,000 hours.

Two years later, on 24 August 1995, HMT-301 returned to the rolls of Marine Corps Aviation, making a new home at Marine Corps Air Station Kaneohe Bay, Hawaii. Since its reactivation, the Windwalkers have continued to carry out their assigned mission of training first tour, refresher, conversion, and transition aviators for the CH-53D helicopter community. The squadron has also been tasked to provide support for tactical operations, troop movements, emergency medevacs, VIP transport and static displays.

On 3 June 2005, HMT-301 was decommissioned for the second time. From its formation in 1966 to its last flight in 2005, HMT-301 flew more than 144,000 hours, trained over 2800 aircrew, and was awarded the CNO safety award 7 times.

== See also ==
- List of decommissioned United States Marine Corps aircraft squadrons
- United States Marine Corps Aviation
