= HMHT-302 =

Marine Heavy Helicopter Training Squadron 302
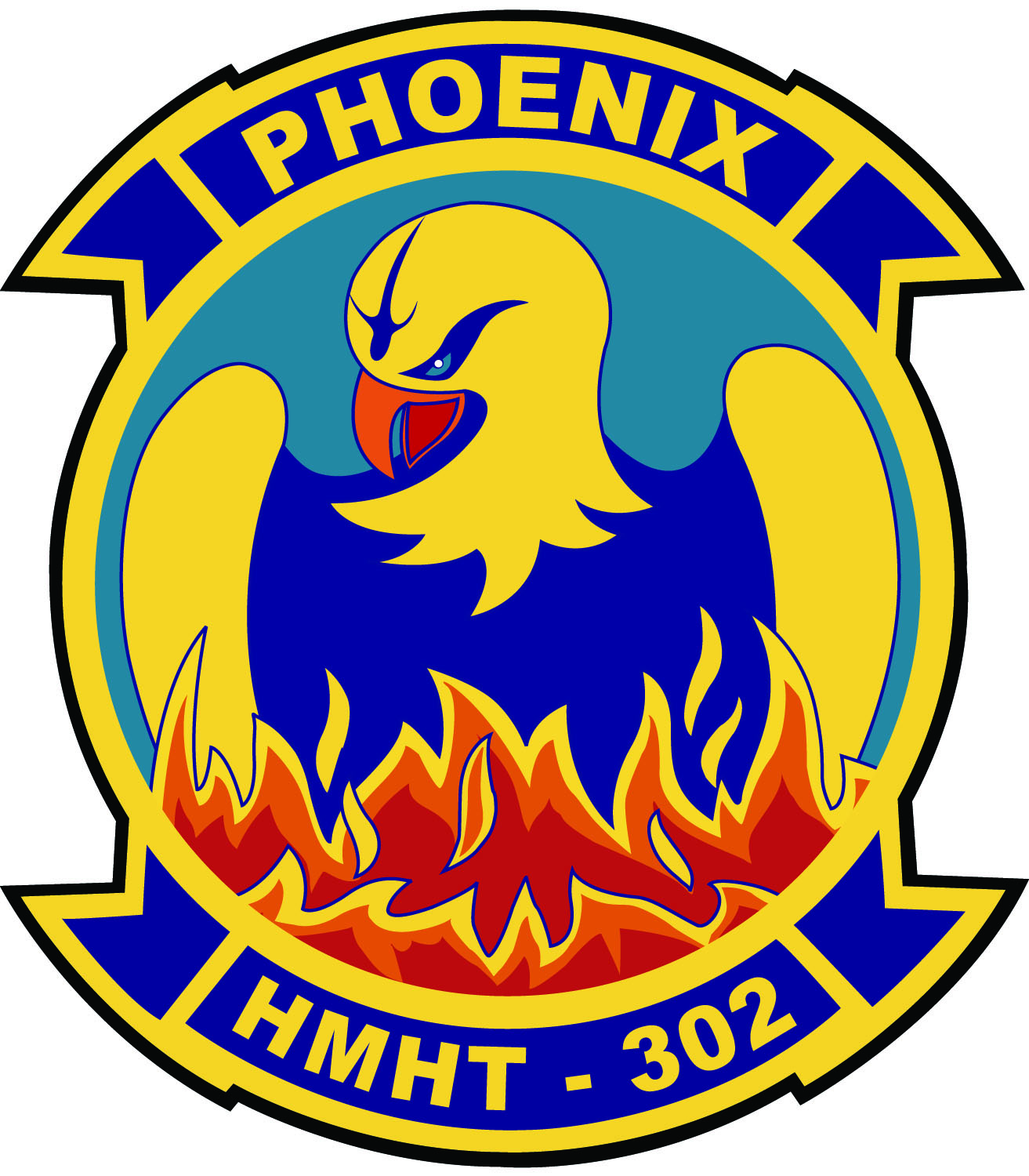
- HMHT-302 Unit Insignia
- Active: 1 November 1966 – 31 March 1972, 20 November 1987 - Present
- Country: United States
- Branch: USMC
- Type: Fleet Replacement Squadron
- Role: Assault support
- Part of: Marine Aircraft Group 29; 2nd Marine Aircraft Wing
- Garrison/HQ: Marine Corps Air Station New River
- Nickname: Phoenix
- Tail Code: UT
- Engagements: None

Commanders
- Commanding Officer: LtCol Matthew L. Wood
- Executive Officer: Maj Daniel M. Kearney

Aircraft flown
- Helicopter: CH-46 Sea Knight (1966-72); CH-53 Sea Stallion (1987-95); CH-53E Super Stallion (1987-present)

Marine Heavy Helicopter Training Squadron 302 (HMHT-302), is a United States Marine Corps helicopter training squadron stationed at Marine Corps Air Station New River, North Carolina. Known as the "Phoenix", HMHT-302 trains newly designated Naval Aviators, conversion pilots, refresher pilots, and enlisted aircrew on the CH-53E Super Stallion and falls under the command of Marine Aircraft Group 29 (MAG-29) and the 2nd Marine Aircraft Wing (2nd MAW).

== Mission ==
Conduct combat capable helicopter flight training for all CH-53E Super Stallion Marine Corps pilots and aircrew. All basic, conversion and refresher pilots as well as aircrew receive assault support training in the CH-53E to prepare them for follow on assignment in the Fleet Marine Force.

== History ==
Marine Heavy Helicopter Training Squadron 302 was originally designated Marine Medium Helicopter Training Squadron 302 (HMMT-302), on 1 November 1966, at Marine Corps Air Facility Santa Ana, California, and assigned to Marine Helicopter Training Group 30, 3rd Marine Aircraft Wing. The squadron was tasked with training newly designated Naval Aviators and conversion pilots to fly the Boeing-Vertol CH-46 Sea Knight. Upon deactivation, the squadron had accumulated 34,850.7 flight hours without mishap.

On 31 March 1972, personnel from HMT-302 were merged with Marine Heavy Helicopter Training Squadron 301 (HMT-301), to form the newly designated Marine Helicopter Training Squadron 301 (HMT-301), conducting pilot training in the CH-46F and CH-53A helicopters. The restructured HMT-301 was attached to Marine Aircraft Group 16. In December 1983, the squadron began training CH-53E Replacement Aircrew (RAC), and later established the Fleet Readiness Aviation Maintenance Personnel (FRAMP) department to train CH-53E enlisted mechanics and technicians. On 20 November 1987, the squadron was reactivated and designated Marine Helicopter Training Squadron 302 (HMT-302) attached to Marine Aircraft Group 16 flying both the CH-53A and CH-53E helicopters. The FRAMP accompanied the helicopters to HMT-302 and in 1991, added the CH-53A/D to their curricula.

Between 9 January – 23 January 1996, HMT-302 safely executed a transcontinental move to MCAS New River, North Carolina. The transfer became effective in February 1996 when HMT-302 officially attached to MAG-29.

An aircraft from the squadron was included in scenes flying through a downtown in the 1997 movie The Jackal (1997 film).

In March to April 1998, HMT-302 deployed to South Africa in support of Presidential Operation — the first Fleet Replacement Squadron to deploy overseas for a real world military operation.

As of 4 March 2003, HMT-302 has surpassed 82710 Class A mishap-free flight hours in Sikorsky H-53 helicopters.

In the summer of 2010, HMT-302 was re-branded Marine Heavy Helicopter Training Squadron 302 (HMHT-302).

== Unit awards ==
- Navy Unit Commendation
- Meritorious Unit Commendation
- National Defense Service Medal

== See also ==
- List of United States Marine Corps aircraft squadrons
- United States Marine Corps Aviation
