= HMH-366 =

Marine Heavy Helicopter Squadron 366
- HMH-366 insignia
- Active: 30 September 1994 – 1 October 2000; 30 September 2008 – 16 December 2022
- Disbanded: 16 December 2022
- Country: United States
- Branch: USMC
- Type: Heavy Transport
- Size: 320+ marines
- Part of: Marine Aircraft Group 29; 2nd Marine Aircraft Wing
- Nickname: Hammerheads
- Motto: "The honor of my squadron is my own"
- Tail Code: HH

Commanders
- Notable commanders: LtCol Lawrence O. Jones; LtCol Charles F. Megown

Aircraft flown
- Cargo helicopter: CH-53D, CH-53E

Marine Heavy Helicopter Squadron 366 (HMH-366) was a United States Marine Corps helicopter squadron consisting of CH-53E Super Stallion heavy transport helicopters. The squadron, known as the "Hammerheads," was based at Marine Corps Air Station New River and fell under the command of Marine Aircraft Group 29 and the 2nd Marine Aircraft Wing. The squadron's tail code was "HH." At the squadron's reactivation on 30 September 2008, it had 130 Marines and 8 aircraft on-hand which grew to more than 300 Marines and 16 aircraft in 2009. The squadron was decommissioned on 16 December 2022 in accordance with Force Design 2030

== Mission ==
Provide assault support transport of combat troops, supplies and equipment during expeditionary, joint or combined operations. Be prepared for short-notice, worldwide employment in support of Marine Air-Ground Task Force operations.

== History ==
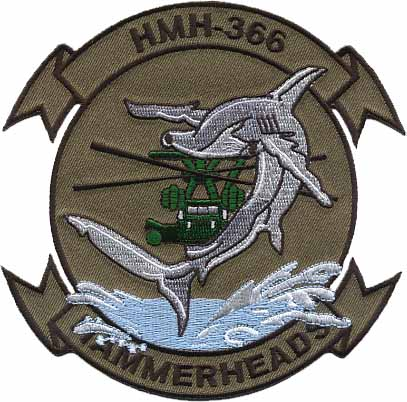
Unit logo from the 1990s

=== Kaneohe Bay (1994–2000) ===
Marine Heavy Helicopter Squadron-366 (HMH-366) was commissioned on 30 September 1994 at MCAS Kaneohe Bay in Hawaii as part of Aviation Support Element Kaneohe (ASEK). As the fourth active CH-53D Sea Stallion squadron, it was the only Hawaiian home-grown helicopter squadron in active service in the Marine Corps. The squadron's call sign, "Hammerheads," was inspired by the fact that Kaneohe Bay is home to one of the world's largest hammerhead shark populations. Reflecting this, the original unit patch featured a hammerhead shark leaping over an airborne CH-53D.

While active in Hawaii, the squadron was deployed to the Pacific Missile Range Facility, Barking Sands. The squadron was also deployed at the Pohakuloa Training Area on Hawai'i island, and completed a successful mainland deployment in support of Combined Arms Exercises through September and October 1998, and Weapons and Tactics Instructors Course (WTI) in February 2000. The squadron also supported a four aircraft deployment to Dhaka, Bangladesh for presidential support of President Clinton's visit to the country. In June of the same year, the squadron participated in exercises during RIMPAC 2000. On 1 October 2000, with a limited number of available CH-53Ds in the Marine Corps, and no addition CH-53Ds being produced, the squadron was de-activated as part of a realignment plan to redistribute the units’ personnel and aircraft to the remaining three CH-53D squadrons in Hawaii (HMH-362, HMH-363, HMH-463), increasing the number of aircraft in those squadrons from eight to ten aircraft.

=== Recommissioning and Deployments (2008–2022) ===
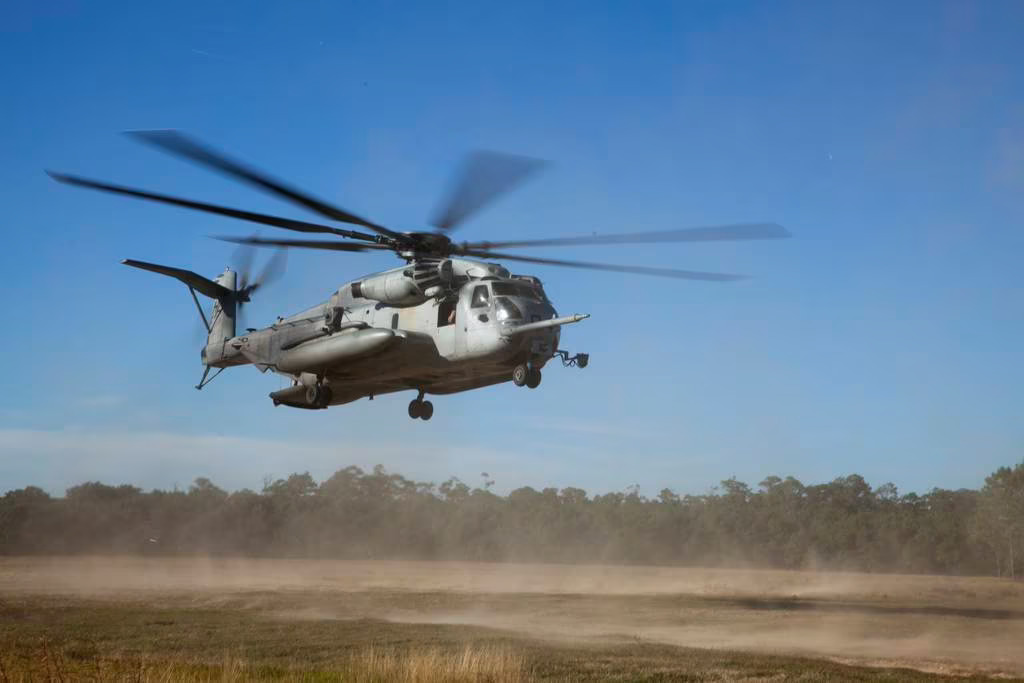
An HMH-366 CH-53E coming to a hover during fast-rope exercises.

The squadron was recommissioned under Marine Aircraft Group 29 on 30 September 2008 as part of the Marine Corp's expansion at the time which demanded additional heavy-lift capability. The squadron was temporarily garrisoned at MCAS Cherry Point while awaiting for new hangars to be constructed at their permanent station at MCAS New River. The squadron was fully transferred to MCAS New River in 2015. Flying the Sikorsky CH-53E Super Stallion, the Squadron deployed to Iraq during Operation Iraqi Freedom from late-2009 until 2 February 2010. The squadron deployed twice to Afghanistan in support of Operation Enduring Freedom. The first deployment took place in 2012, and the second deployment was the final HMH deployment of Enduring Freedom, taking place in 2014. Additionally, the squadron provided heavy lift and troop transportation support during both Exercise Trident Juncture 2018 and Exercise Cold Response 2022 in Norway.

At the request of Commandant of the Marine Corps David H. Berger, the Marine Corps would begin the divestment of three HMH squadrons as a part of Force Design 2030 (FD2030), a restructuring program which seeks to reshape the Marine Corps into a fighting force designed to tackle future threats. An update to the plan in March 2020 sought the divestment of these HMH squadrons under advisory from internal sources which cited that the capabilities of the five (as opposed to the original eight) heavy lift squadrons would satisfy the force requirements under FD2030. HMH-366 was selected as one of the three squadrons to be decommissioned, and its decommissioning ceremony was held at Marine Corps Air Station New River in North Carolina on 16 December 2022.

== Unit awards ==
A unit citation or commendation is an award bestowed upon an organization for the action cited. Members of the unit who participated in said actions are allowed to wear on their uniforms the awarded unit citation. HMH-366 has been presented with the following awards:

Ribbon	Unit Award
	Meritorious Unit Commendation
	Joint Meritorious Unit Award
	National Defense Service Medal
	Afghanistan Campaign Medal
	Global War on Terrorism Service Medal

== See also ==
- United States Marine Corps Aviation
- List of inactive United States Marine Corps aircraft squadrons
