= HMH-466 =

Marine Heavy Helicopter Squadron 466
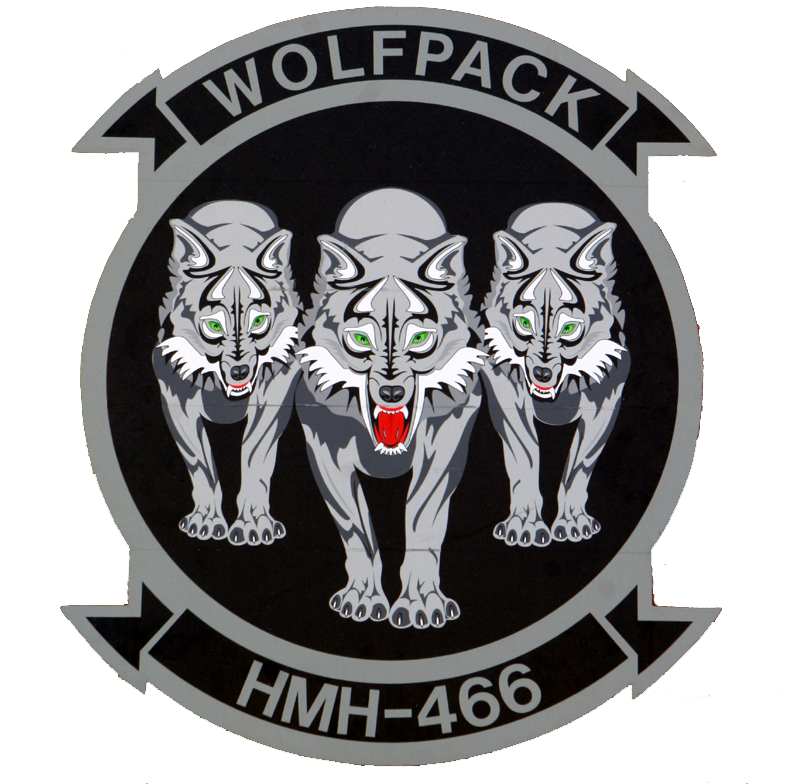
- HMH-466 insignia
- Active: 30 November 1984 – present
- Country: United States
- Allegiance: United States of America
- Branch: United States Marine Corps
- Type: Marine Heavy helicopter squadron
- Role: Assault Support
- Part of: Marine Aircraft Group 16; 3rd Marine Aircraft Wing
- Garrison/HQ: Marine Corps Air Station Miramar
- Nickname: Wolfpack
- Tail Code: YK
- Mascot: Romulus
- Engagements: Operation Restore Hope; Operation Desert Storm; Operation Iraqi Freedom; Operation Enduring Freedom

Commanders
- Current commander: Lieutenant Colonel McGonigle

Marine Heavy Helicopter Squadron 466 (HMH-466) is a United States Marine Corps helicopter squadron consisting of CH-53E Super Stallion transport helicopters. The squadron, known as the "Wolfpack", is based at Marine Corps Air Station Miramar, California and falls under the command of Marine Aircraft Group 16 (MAG-16) and the 3rd Marine Aircraft Wing (3rd MAW).

In the past 25 years, the Wolfpack has participated in fourteen Marine Expeditionary Units, Special Operations Capable [MEU (SOC)] Deployments and has been the recipient of many prestigious awards, including the Secretary of Defense (SECDEF) Phoenix Award for outstanding maintenance (1987), the Fleet Marine Force Pacific (FMFPAC) Annual Aviation Safety Award (1986), the Mike Yunck Award for best overall squadron in the Third Marine Aircraft Wing (3d MAW) (1988, 1999, 2010), Meritorious Unit Citation (MUC) (1986), Navy and Marine Corps Unit Commendation (NUC) (1992, 2006, 2007, 2008, 2009), Presidential Unit Citation (PUC) (2010), the Keith B. McCutcheon Award for Heavy Lift Squadron of the Year (1999, 2006, 2010), the Chief of Naval Operations (CNO) Aviation Safety Award (1999, 2004, 2005, 2006, 2009, 2010, 2011).

== History ==
=== Early years ===
Marine Heavy Helicopter Squadron 466 (HMH-466), the "Wolfpack," was commissioned on 30 November 1984, as the Marine Corps’ third, and Marine Aircraft Group 16's (MAG-16), second CH-53E squadron. By December 1984, the squadron was 180 Marines strong and growing, and had accepted two of sixteen CH-53E Super Stallion helicopters from Sikorsky Aircraft Company in Stratford, Connecticut.

The Wolfpack conducted its first operational flight on 19 December 1984, and by 30 June 1985, the squadron had accepted eleven of its sixteen aircraft. In its first seven months as an operational squadron, HMH-466 had flown 1100 hours, carried 1000 passengers, and lifted 175,000 pounds of cargo. Delivery of aircraft continued until 5 August 1985, when the squadron received its sixteenth CH-53E.

=== Gulf War & the 1990s ===
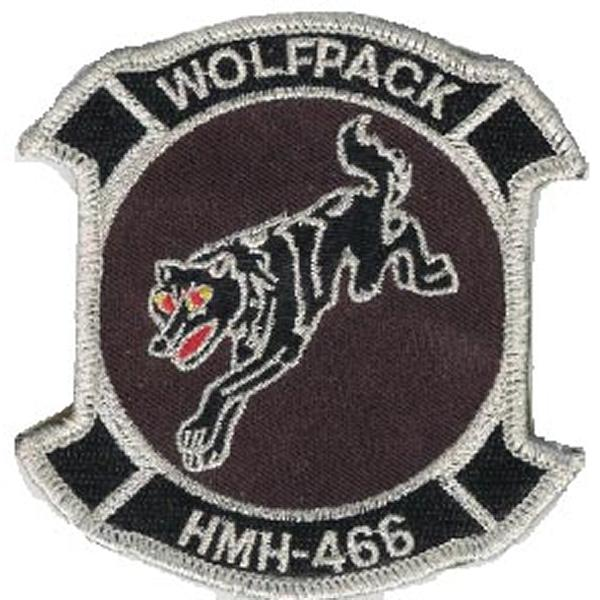
Older squadron logo.

When Iraq invaded Kuwait in August 1990, the Wolfpack became the first CH-53E squadron to deploy to Saudi Arabia. While in support of operations DESERT SHIELD and DESERT STORM, HMH-466 recovered downed aircraft, conducted the first Night Vision Goggle (NVG) troop insertion, and provided heavy lift support from port facilities to staging areas in preparation for the ground phase of the operation. Upon cessation of hostilities, the Wolfpack returned to Marine Corps Air Station (MCAS) Tustin having sustained no losses of personnel or aircraft.

In May 1992, the Wolfpack embarked upon its first Unit Deployment Program (UDP) to MAG-36, MCAS Futenma, Okinawa, Japan and became the second CH-53E squadron deployed to the Western Pacific. In addition, the squadron detached four aircraft to Marine Medium Helicopter Squadron 161 (HMM-161) in support of the 11th MEU (SOC). In November 1992, HMH-466 returned to MAG-16 thus concluding the first of many extremely successful six-month UDP rotations.

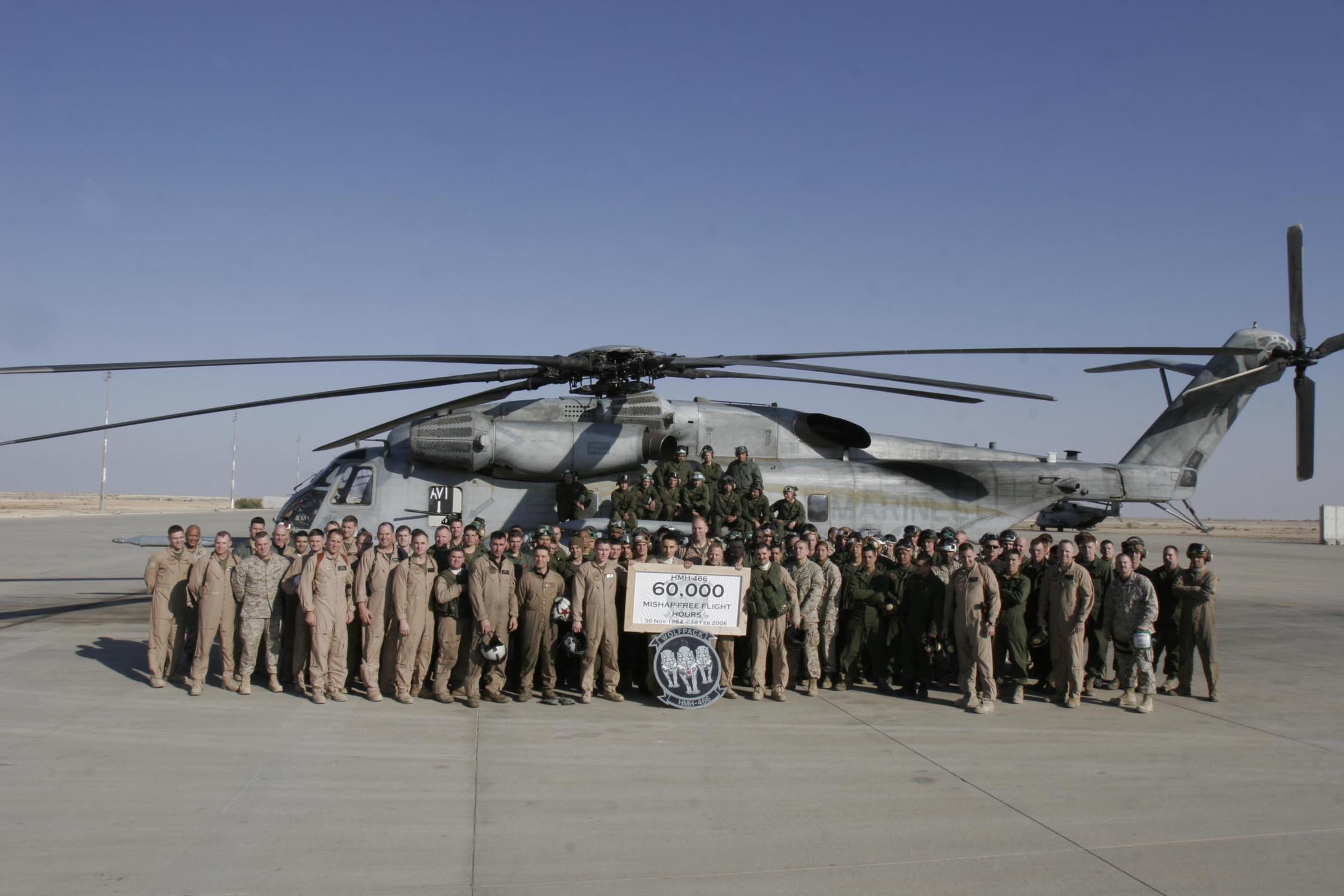
Squadron photo celebrating 60,000 flight hours

From December 1992 to March 1993, the Wolfpack detached four aircraft to Somalia in support of Operation RESTORE HOPE. In November 1993, the squadron celebrated its ninth birthday. During this month, the Wolfpack attained 25,000 flight hours, becoming the only CH-53E squadron to reach this class "A" mishap-free milestone. The squadron again deployed to the Western Pacific in May 1994, detaching four aircraft to both HMM-161 and HMM-262 in support of the 15th and 31st MEU (SOC)s, respectively.- The four CH-53 E's of 15th MEU ACE were detached to Entebbe, Uganda as part of Operation Support Hope- the refugee relief operation for the Rwandan refugees.

On 29 May 1995, the Wolfpack became the first Marine Corps CH-53E squadron to exceed 30,000 mishap-free flight hours. During October 1995, the Wolfpack detached four aircraft to HMM-163 in support of the 13th MEU (SOC) while the main body of the squadron departed for Okinawa, Japan in May 1996. During the deployment a CH-53E Fleet wide grounding for faulty main rotor head swash plates kept the squadron hard at work rebuilding eight aircraft. Upon the completion of the UDP in November 1996, the squadron returned to MCAS Tustin.

Following a successful Okinawa deployment, the Wolfpack continued to support Marine Corps forces throughout the continental United States (CONUS). In January and February 1997, the Wolfpack supported various units at the Mountain Warfare Training Center (MWTC) in Bridgeport, California. October was spent at 29 Palms, California, supporting the Combined Arms Exercise (CAX), and December concluded with the squadron focused on preparations for the next deployment to Okinawa.

With another UDP under way, the squadron also supported three separate MEU (SOC)s with detachments stretched across the globe. In conjunction with the Base Realignment and Closure Commission (BRAC) direction, the squadron relocated from MCAS Tustin to MCAS Miramar following their return from UDP.

=== Early 2000s ===
In February 2000 the Wolfpack again detached four aircraft to the 13th MEU (SOC). Deploying with HMM-161 aboard the USS Tarawa the detachment performed missions in East Timor, as well as supporting the withdrawal of the USS Cole from the Persian Gulf after the ship was attacked by terrorists while at port in Yemen.

Throughout 2001, the Wolfpack participated in three CAXs and supported two Weapons and Tactics Instructor Courses (WTI). In May 2001 the Wolfpack also supported President Bush during his first visit to California as President. Later that year, the squadron shifted its focus to aircrew training for the upcoming 11th MEU (SOC) detachment as well as another UDP to Okinawa in June 2002.

The UDP proved to be a diverse deployment for the squadron. Flying across the Western Pacific rim, the heavy lift community was well represented by the Wolfpack in operations such as BALAKITAN in the Philippines and COBRA GOLD in Thailand. Upon its return to MCAS Miramar in July 2003, the Wolfpack had completed a thirteen-month deployment, the longest in squadron history.

In August 2003, the Wolfpack supported HMX-1 and President Bush during his visit to Los Alamitos, California and later in the year provided six aircraft and the requisite maintainers to support WTI 1-04.

Tragedy struck the San Diego community in October 2003, as 400,000 acres of land were burned by wildfires. Rising to help the community, the Wolfpack launched six aircraft, each carrying 1320 gallon water buckets, to provide much needed assistance to beleaguered fire fighters as they quelled the expansive blaze.

December was a month of preparation as the squadron set its eyes on training. Spending time in Indian Springs, Nevada and Yuma, Arizona the Wolfpack sharpened their skills as they readied to deploy to Iraq.

=== The Global War on Terror ===
In January 2004, the squadron embarked sixteen aircraft aboard the USS Boxer for transport to the Persian Gulf. The Wolfpack carried eleven 13,000 pound tugs and offloaded HMM-261 from the USS Bataan before flying all sixteen aircraft 350 miles north to Al Asad Airbase in Central Iraq.

While in Iraq, the squadron became the first USMC frag-capable squadron in country for Combined Joint Task Force 7 (CJTF-7). While deployed, the squadron flew 3,774.9 hours, and transported over 8,530 passengers and 6.4 million pounds of cargo in support Operation IRAQI FREEDOM II-1 (OIF). In addition, the squadron was recognized by the Secretary of the Navy for surpassing the 50,000 hour class "A" mishap-free milestone during the deployment.

On 21 September 2005 the Wolfpack departed MCAS Miramar for another deployment in support of OIF 04-06.2. The squadron accomplished all of its missions to include High Value Individual raids, Very Important Person lifts like that of the Secretary of Defense, in Amman, Jordan, Tactical Bulk Fuel Delivery System (TBFDS) refueling missions, Tactical Recovery of Aircraft and Personnel via external lift, and general support of ground forces operating throughout Iraq. And on 18 February 2006 the Wolfpack achieved another noteworthy milestone by surpassing 60,000 class "A" mishap-free flight hours.

In April 2007 the Wolfpack again departed CONUS for Al Asad, Iraq. Shortly into the deployment the squadron welcomed its four aircraft from the 13th MEU (SOC) as they were detached from the 13th MEU still operating in the Middle East to support Multi-National Forces-West (MNF-W) in Iraq, a first in the CH-53E community. Throughout the deployment the squadron completed a multitude of missions and safely returned home to MCAS Miramar in November 2007 after flying an impressive 3,700 combat flight hours and 2,400 sorties, while transporting over 3.4 million pounds of cargo and 18,000 passengers.

The squadron again left for Iraq in October 2008 and from Kuwait the squadron saw a four aircraft detachment depart to Kandahar, Afghanistan. In Iraq, the Wolfpack attached a four aircraft detachment from the 26th MEU and fully integrated the detachment into the squadron. Less than a month into operations in Iraq, the Wolfpack was called upon to provide dynamic support to another area of the country and sent four aircraft and personnel to the Expeditionary Airfield of Sahl Sinjar in northwestern Iraq for over eight weeks where the Wolfpack provided heavy lift and general support to I MEF. Throughout the rest of the deployment the squadron successfully completed a multitude of missions in different areas of the world and returned home safely in March 2009.

HMH-466 departed CONUS in January 2012 in support of Operation Enduring Freedom Afghanistan. HMH-466 was reinforced by HMH-366 from Cherry Point, NC to make a full squadron. During the deployment HMH-466/366 to form a cohesive unit called themselves HMH-America and used the call sign "Cyclops". Over the course of 7 months the squadron participated in over 175 named operations, 4,500 combat flight hours supporting USMC operations and ISAF partners including the Afghan National Army, Australia, Great Britain, and Georgia in RC Southwest.

== See also ==
- United States Marine Corps Aviation
- Organization of the United States Marine Corps
- List of United States Marine Corps aircraft squadrons
