= 2016 United States Marine Corps helicopter collision =

Helicopter collision

Coordinates: 21.6139°N 158.1325°W

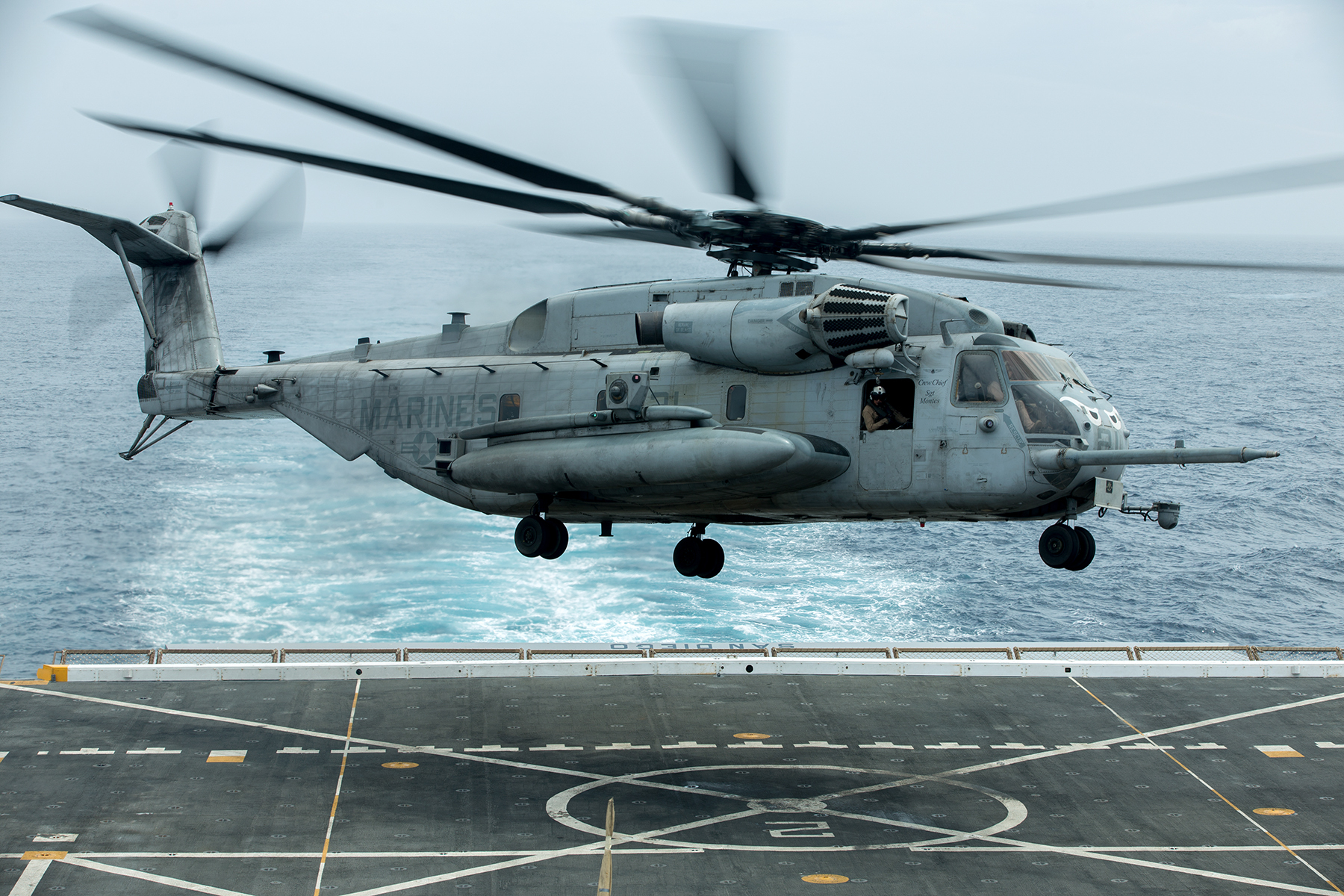
- A US Marine Corps CH-53E Super Stallion similar to ones involved

Accident
- Date: January 14, 2016
- Summary: Mid-air collision
- Site: Off Oahu, Hawaii, United States
- Total fatalities: 12 (all)
- Total survivors: 0

First aircraft
- Type: Sikorsky CH-53E Super Stallion
- Operator: United States Marine Corps (USMC)
- Registration: 163061
- Occupants: 6
- Fatalities: 6
- Survivors: 0

Second aircraft
- Type: Sikorsky CH-53E Super Stallion
- Operator: USMC
- Registration: 161255
- Occupants: 6
- Fatalities: 6
- Survivors: 0

On January 14, 2016, two Sikorsky CH-53E Super Stallion helicopters from the 1st Marine Aircraft Wing of the United States Marine Corps collided over the Pacific Ocean off Oahu's North Shore in Hawaii.[1][2] Each helicopter carried six Marines from Marine Heavy Helicopter Squadron 463 (HMH-463), based at Marine Corps Base Hawaii, Kaneohe Bay. Search and rescue crews found the debris field from both aircraft.[3][4] On January 20, all twelve crew members were declared deceased.[5] They were Maj. Shawn M. Campbell, 41, of College Station, Texas; Capt. Brian T. Kennedy, 31, of Philadelphia, Pennsylvania; Capt. Kevin T. Roche, 30, of St. Louis, Missouri; Capt. Steven R. Torbert, 29, of Florence, Alabama; Sgt. Jeffrey A. Sempler, 22, of Woodruff, South Carolina; Sgt. Adam C. Schoeller, 25, of Gardners, Pennsylvania; Sgt. Dillon J. Semolina, 24, of Chaska, Minnesota; Sgt. William J. Turner, 25, of Florala, Alabama; Cpl. Matthew R. Drown, 23, of Spring, Texas; Cpl. Christopher J. Orlando, 23, of Hingham, Massachusetts; Cpl. Thomas J. Jardas, 22, of Fort Myers, Florida; and Lance Cpl. Ty L. Hart, 21, of Aumsville, Oregon.[6]

== Accident ==
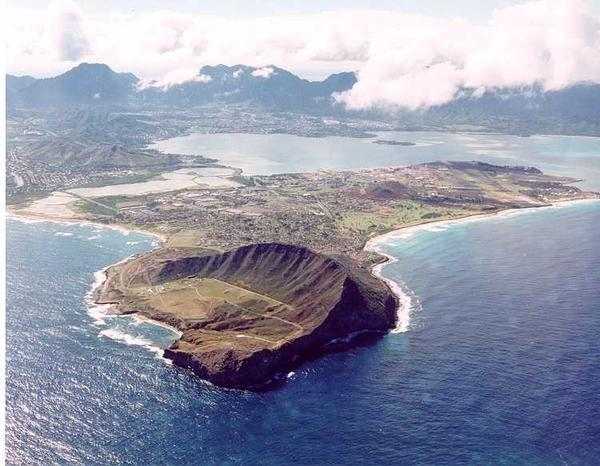
Kaneohe Bay, in background. Mokapu Peninsula, the site of the Marine air station, is in the middle-ground

The two aircraft, Pegasus 31 and Pegasus 32, departed in the late evening hours on a routine training mission from the Marine Corps Air Station Kaneohe Bay and flew over the North Shore in the vicinity of Haleiwa. They were conducting complex maneuvers in formation when Pegasus 31, with the less-experienced pilot, fell a little behind Pegasus 32. Pegasus 31 increased speed in the dark to catch up to the other helicopter. The low light conditions prevented the pilots from seeing each other's craft as Pegasus made a sharp left turn in front of the less-experienced pilot. Local residents later reported hearing two distinct explosions. A resident on a beach reported seeing the two helicopters flying in the distance, then a fireball.

== Recovery and salvage ==
The search and rescue operation involved the United States Air Force, Coast Guard, Marines, Army MEDEVAC helicopter crews, the Navy, and the Honolulu Fire and Police departments. Rough weather complicated the search. Winds blowing at 23 miles per hour sent debris in many directions. Waves 30 feet high made it hard to see debris between them. Eventually all four of the life rafts were found on the water's surface during the 5-day search, but there was no evidence that they had ever been used by the helicopter crews. The rescue operation turned to recovery and salvage on January 19 and the crew members were assumed dead. In April, the remains of nine of the twelve crew members were recovered. Large portions of the wreckage was located in 325 feet (99 m) of water. The ensuing investigation found that all crew members were killed instantly. Three of them are still missing.

== Investigation ==
The Marine Corps' investigation found that both airframes were mechanically sound and in good repair. The immediate cause of the collision was pilot error, but the Marine Corps identified underlying causes contributing to this.

The Super Stallion is oldest and largest of Marine helicopters. The ones belonging to the Marine Corps were put to hard use in Iraq and Afghanistan and never adequately refurbished afterward. Super Stallions are out of production and spare parts are so difficult to procure that the Corps itself was manufacturing some of these parts. Therefore Marine Heavy Helicopter Squadron 463 (HMH-463) didn't have the parts to keep enough helicopters flight-ready. They had to cannibalize parts from other aircraft around Hawaii in order to make it to training exercises in Australia in 2015. Across the Marine Corps, only 5 of every 16 Super Stallions were flyable at any given time. HMH-463 failed an inspection in September, 2015. They were unable to get 50% of their helicopters in the air by Thanksgiving and even though maintenance crews worked 12 hours daily there were days during the month of the crash that no helicopters were able to fly. This prevented pilots from accumulating the pilot training hours they needed. According to the copilots, they were supposed to be training 16 hours a month but were lucky if they flew 10. When pilots don't fly, their skills get rusty. In addition, two of the pilots were not adequately trained in the use of night-vision goggles.

Three days before the crash their commander, Lt. Col. Edward Pavelka, was relieved of his command for not getting enough helicopters flying. He told his superior, Brigadier General Russell Sanborn, commander of the 1st. Marine Aircraft Wing, "If the General wants up aircraft, the Marines will get him up aircraft," implying that his firing would not solve the problem and that his successor would feel forced to either file false reports of flight or send Marines up in improper conditions. Squadron members reported low morale. The maintenance crews were fatigued by the grueling work schedule and air crews were worried by their lack of flight hours.

== Aftermath ==
On January 20, Secretary of Defense Ash Carter made a statement honoring the crew members. "These proud Marines died as they lived, in service to a country they loved and in dedication to a cause greater than themselves," Carter said. Carter thanked the Air Force, Coast Guard, Navy, and Marine personnel for their involvement in rescue operations. A memorial service for the lost Marines was held Friday, January 22 at Marine Corps Base Hawaii.
