= Who Killed Lt. Van Dorn? =

2018 documentary film by Zachary Stauffer

- Directed by: Zachary Stauffer
- Release date: 2018
- Running time: 80 minutes
- Country: United States
- Language: English

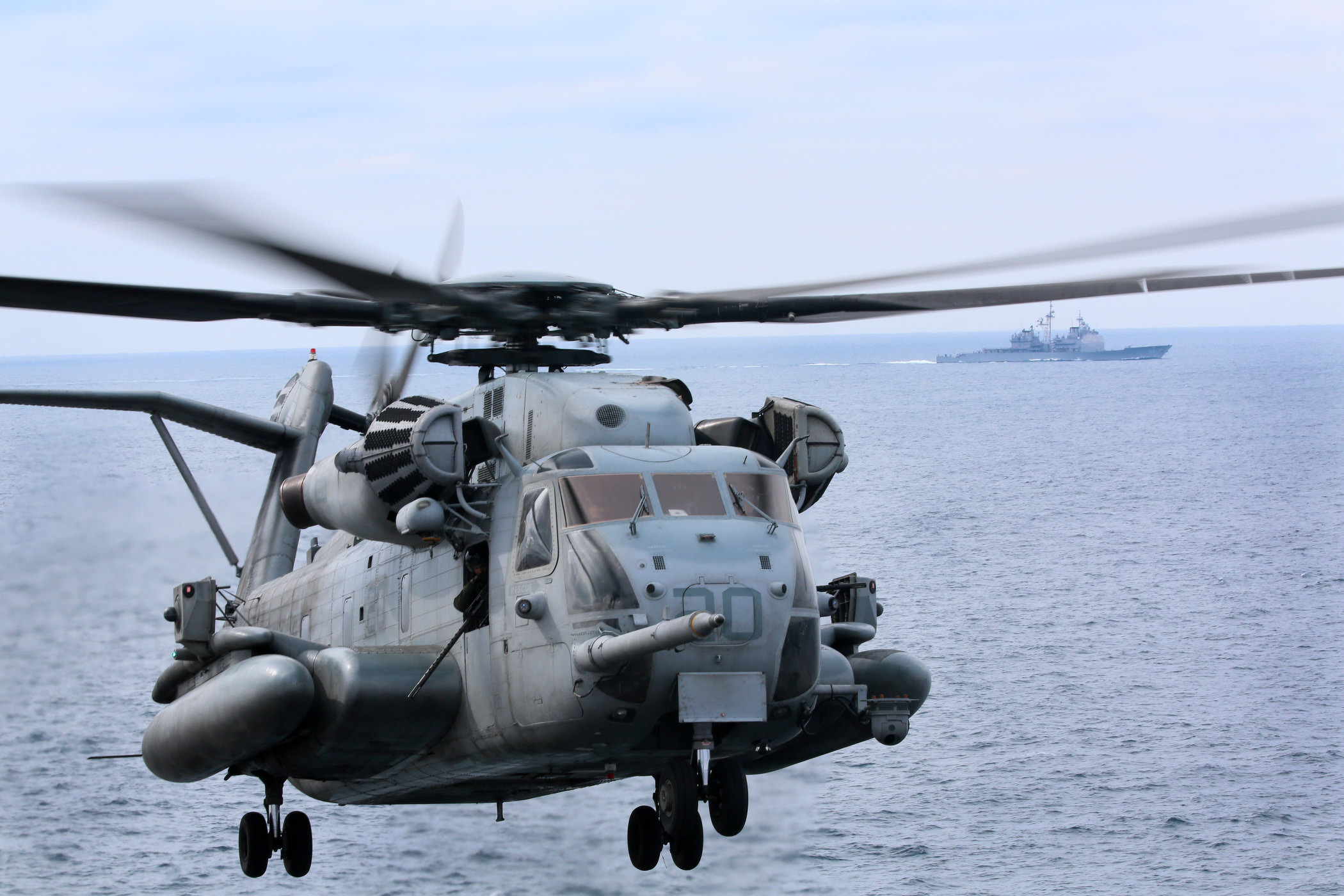
A CH-53E flies near USS Anzio at sea.

Who Killed Lt. Van Dorn? is a 2018 American documentary film.

== Description ==
The documentary examines the events leading up to and immediately after the 2014 crash of a Sikorsky MH-53E Sea Dragon off Cape Henry, Virginia. Three crew members perished in the crash, among them Lieutenant Wes Van Dorn. The documentary exposed widespread reliability issues across both Navy and Marine Corp 53E fleets.

The reporting for the documentary included collaborations with the Virginian-Pilot, NBC News, and Honolulu Civil Beat. It was directed by Zachary Stauffer.

== Reception ==
The documentary was screened at the Mill Valley Film Fest with the Mercury News calling it "A high point in the fest’s documentary category" and the San Francisco Chronicle calling it "A solid piece of investigative journalism." The film was favorably reviewed by Film Threat.

The Nation magazine called the film "a compelling story of how the dysfunction and greed of the military-industrial complex put US military personnel at risk, often with fatal consequences... Every concerned citizen and every member of Congress should see this film. Lives depend on it."

The documentary was poorly received by Navy and Marine Corp senior officers, who declined to cooperate and described the documentary as "garbage journalism".

== Awards ==
- Audience Favorite, Mill Valley Film Festival, 2018
- Best Documentary, Monarch Film Festival, 2018
- Audience Award, RiverRun International Film Festival, 2019
- Best Documentary, Columbus International Film & Animation Festival, 2019
- Special Jury Award, Workers Unite Film Festival, 2019
- First Time Filmmaker Award, Newburyport Documentary Film Festival, 2019
- Best Feature Doc, Jacksonville Film Festival, 2019

== Festival selections ==
2019

- Jacksonville Film Festival
- Alexandria Film Festival
- San Francisco Veterans Film Festival
- Ojai Film Festival
- United Nations Association Film Festival
- Louisville's International Festival of Film
- Chagrin Documentary Film Fest
- Golden Door International Film Festival
- Niagara Falls International Film Festival
- Newburyport Documentary Film Festival
- DOCUTAH International Documentary Film Festival
- San Antonio Film Festival
- New Haven Documentary Film Festival
- DUMBO Film Festival
- The Workers Unite Film Festival
- Newport Beach Film Festival
- Columbus International Film & Animation Festival
- RiverRun International Film Festival
- Annapolis Film Festival
- Fargo Film Festival
- San Luis Obispo International Film Festival
- Sedona International Film Festival

2018

- Monarch Film Festival
- Mill Valley Film Festival
