= John Kelvin Koelsch =

US Navy Medal of Honor recipient (1923–1951)

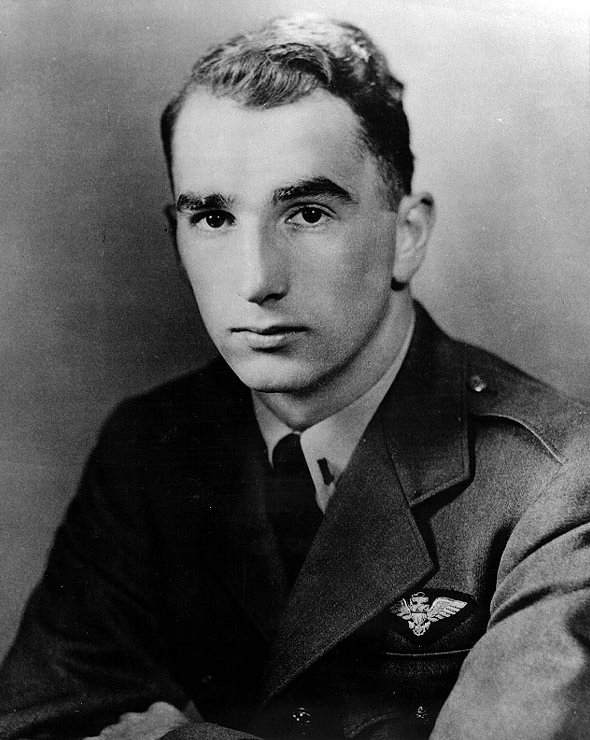
- Lt(jg) John K. Koelsch
- Born: December 22, 1923; London, England
- Died: October 16, 1951 (aged 27); North Korea
- Burial place: Arlington National Cemetery
- Alma mater: Princeton University; Choate School
- Military career
- Allegiance: United States
- Branch: United States Navy
- Service years: 1942–1951
- Rank: Lieutenant (Junior Grade)
- Nickname: "Jack"
- Units: Composite Squadron 15; Torpedo Squadron 97; Torpedo Squadron 18; Helicopter Squadron 1 Helicopter Squadron 2
- Conflicts: World War II; Korean War
- Awards: Medal of Honor; Purple Heart

John Kelvin Koelsch (December 22, 1923 – October 16, 1951) was a United States Navy officer and a recipient of the United States' highest military decoration, the Medal of Honor, for his actions in the Korean War. He was the first helicopter pilot to be awarded the Medal of Honor.

== Early life ==
Koelsch was born in London, the third son of American banker Henry August Koelsch and Beulah Anne Hubbard Koelsch. The family sailed back to the United States in 1924 and resided at Briarcliff Manor, New York. He was educated at the Choate School and Princeton University.

== Military career ==
Koelsch joined the United States Navy Reserve as an aviation cadet on September 14, 1942, and was commissioned as an ensign on October 23, 1944. After completing flight training he served in the Pacific War. During the next few years, he served at Naval Air Stations at Fort Lauderdale, Florida, and Norfolk, Virginia, and subsequently flew with Composite Squadron 15 and Torpedo Squadrons 97 and 18. He became an accomplished torpedo bomber pilot, and was promoted to lieutenant (junior grade) on August 1, 1946. First enrolling at Princeton in September 1941, he returned to the university after the war, and finally graduated in 1949.

After the outbreak of the Korean War, Koelsch joined Helicopter Squadron 1 (HU-1) at Miramar, California, in August 1950. As officer in charge of a helicopter detachment, he joined USS Princeton in October for pilot rescue duty off the eastern coast of Korea. He served in Princeton until June 1951, when he joined Helicopter Squadron 2 (HU-2) for pilot rescue duty off Wonsan, Korea, then under naval blockade. He provided lifeguard duty for pilots who were downed either in coastal waters or over enemy-held territory. On June 22, he rescued a naval aviator from the waters of Wonsan Harbor, southeast of Yo Do Island.

Late in the afternoon of July 3, 1951, Koelsch responded to a distress call from a Marine aviator, Captain James V. Wilkins, whose F4U Corsair had been hit by enemy fire during an armed reconnaissance mission about 35 miles (56 km) southwest of Wonsan. Wilkins parachuted from his burning plane at low altitude, with severe burns about his legs. Despite approaching darkness, worsening weather, and enemy ground fire, Koelsch located the downed aviator in the Anbyon Valley and began his pickup. Thick fog prevented the air cover from protecting the unarmed HO3S helicopter, and intense enemy fire downed the craft as crewman George M. Neal, AM3, hoisted the injured pilot toward the helicopter. All three men survived the crash; and, after hiding in the mountains from enemy patrols for three days, they began a slow march to the coast. After six more days, they reached a coastal village, where they were captured the following day while hiding in a hut. During his captivity, though beaten and abused, Koelsch refused to aid his captors or submit to interrogation. His fortitude and personal bravery inspired his fellow prisoners.

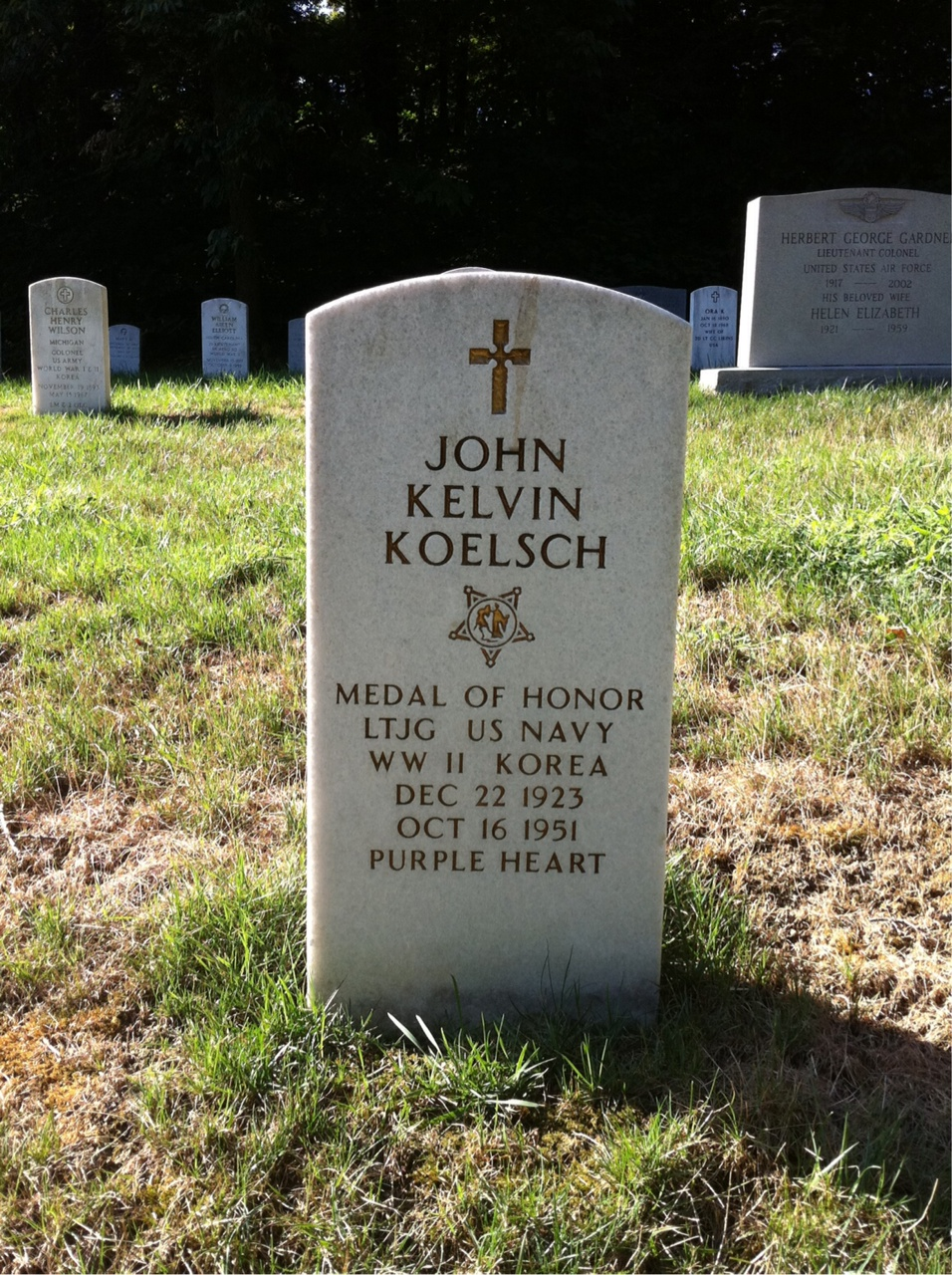
Grave at Arlington National Cemetery

Koelsch died of malnutrition and dysentery on October 16, 1951, while a prisoner of war. On August 3, 1955, he was posthumously awarded the Medal of Honor for his actions in Korea.

Koelsch is buried at Arlington National Cemetery, Arlington, Virginia. His grave can be found in section 30, grave 1123-RH.

== Medal of Honor citation ==
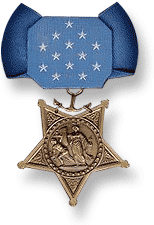

Memorial to Koelsch, Briarcliff Manor, New York

Lieutenant (jg) Koelsch's official citation reads:

For conspicuous gallantry and intrepidity at the risk of his life above and beyond the call of duty while serving with a Navy helicopter rescue unit in North Korea on 3 July 1951. Although darkness was rapidly approaching when information was received that a Marine aviator had been shot down and was trapped by the enemy in mountainous terrain deep in hostile territory, Lieutenant (Junior Grade) Koelsch voluntarily flew a helicopter to the reported position of the downed airman in an attempt to effect a rescue. With an almost solid overcast concealing everything below the mountain peaks, he descended in his unarmed and vulnerable aircraft without the accompanying fighter escort to an extremely low altitude beneath the cloud level and began a systematic search. Despite the increasingly intense enemy fire, which struck his helicopter on one occasion, he persisted in his mission until he succeeded in locating the downed pilot, who was suffering from serious burns on the arms and legs. While the victim was being hoisted into the aircraft, it was struck again by an accurate burst of hostile fire and crashed on the side of the mountain. Quickly extricating his crewmen and the aviator from the wreckage, Lieutenant (Junior Grade) Koelsch led them from the vicinity in an effort to escape from hostile troops, evading the enemy forces for 9 days and rendering such medical attention as possible to his severely burned companion until all were captured. Up to the time of his death while still a captive of the enemy, Lieutenant (Junior Grade) Koelsch steadfastly refused to aid his captors in any manner and served to inspire his fellow prisoners by his fortitude and consideration for others. His great personal valor and heroic spirit of self-sacrifice throughout sustain and enhance the finest traditions of the United States naval service.

== Awards and Decorations ==

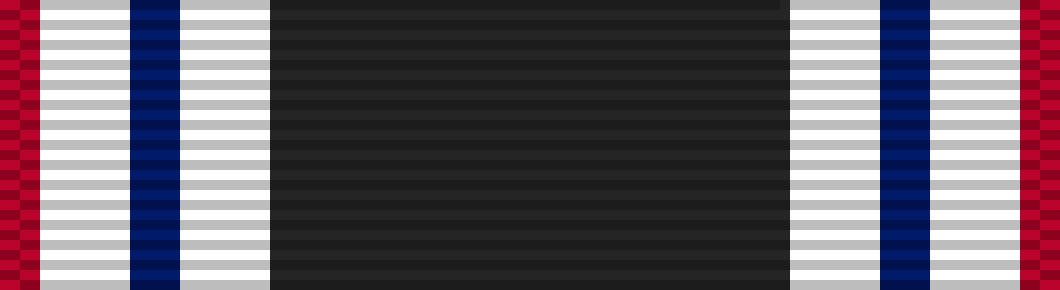

Badge	Naval Aviator Badge		
1st row	Medal of Honor	Purple Heart	Navy Presidential Unit Citation
2nd row	Prisoner of War Medal	American Campaign Medal	Asiatic–Pacific Campaign Medal
3rd row	World War II Victory Medal	National Defense Service Medal	Korean Service Medal with 1 Campaign star
4th row	Korean Presidential Unit Citation	United Nations Korea Medal	Korean War Service Medal Retroactively Awarded, 2003

=== Namesake ===
The destroyer escort USS Koelsch (DE-1049) (later reclassified as a frigate) was named in his honor.

== See also ==
- List of Korean War Medal of Honor recipients
