= Köln (disambiguation) =

Köln or Cologne is the fourth largest city in Germany.

Köln or KOLN may also refer to:

== Places ==
- Electorate of Cologne, a state and electorate until 1803
- Free Imperial City of Cologne

== German navy ships ==
- SMS Cöln (1909) (1911–1914), a Kolberg-class light cruiser
- SMS Cöln (1916) (1918–1919), a Cöln-class light cruiser
- German cruiser Köln (1930–1945), a Königsberg-class light cruiser
- Köln (1961–1982), an F120 Köln-class frigate
- German frigate Köln (F211) (1984–2012), an F122 Bremen-class frigate

== Music ==
- Köln (Last Exit album), 1990
- Köln (Marshall Gilkes album)
- The Köln Concert (Keith Jarrett album)

== Television ==
- KOLN, a TV station in Lincoln, Nebraska, United States

== Sports ==
- 1. FC Köln, the Association football team for Cologne
- RheinStars Köln, the basketball team for Cologne
- Cologne Cardinals, the baseball team for Cologne

== See also ==
- Kölsch (disambiguation)
- Cologne (disambiguation)
