= Kölsch =

Kölsch may refer to:

- Kölsch (beer), a style of beer from Cologne, Germany
- Kölsch (artist), house musician/DJ
- Colognian, a Ripuarian dialect spoken in and around Cologne
- USS Koelsch, a vessel of the Garcia class of the US Navy

== People with the surname ==
- C. Frederick Koelsch (1907–1999), American chemist
- John Kelvin Koelsch (1923–1951), United States Navy officer
- Rune Reilly Kölsch or Rune RK (born 1977), Danish producer and songwriter
- Kevin Kölsch, American film director and screenwriter

== See also ==
- SK Kölsch, a German television series
- Tierisch Kölsch, a German television series
