= Second VA-75 (U.S. Navy) =

Attack Squadron 75
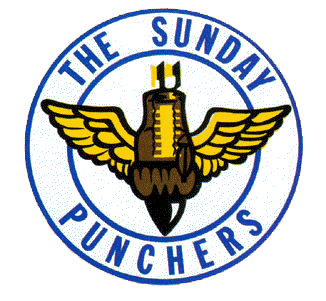
- VA-75 insignia
- Active: 20 July 1943 – 28 February 1997
- Country: United States
- Branch: United States Navy
- Type: All Weather Attack
- Part of: Inactive
- Nickname: Sunday Punchers
- Engagements: World War II * Philippines campaign (1944–45) * Battle of Leyte Gulf; Korean War; Cuban Missile Crisis; Vietnam War; Multinational Force in Lebanon; Operation Desert Storm; Operation Southern Watch; Operation Deny Flight

Aircraft flown
- Attack: A-1 Skyraider; A-6 Intruder
- Bomber: SBD Dauntless; SB2C Helldiver
- Fighter: F4U Corsair

Attack Squadron 75 (VA-75) or ATKRON 75 was an attack squadron of the United States Navy that was active from World War II through the 1990s. Nicknamed the "Sunday Punchers," they were based out of Naval Air Station Oceana, Virginia. Originally established as Bombing Squadron EIGHTEEN (VB-18) on 20 July 1943, it was redesignated Attack Squadron VA-7A on 15 November 1946, redesignated Attack Squadron VA-74 on 27 July 1948, redesignated Attack Squadron VA-75 on 15 February 1950 and disestablished on 28 February 1997. They were the second squadron to be designated VA-75, the first VA-75 was disestablished on 30 November 1949. They were the first fleet squadron to operate the A-6 Intruder and the last unit to fly it in operational service.

== History ==
=== World War II ===
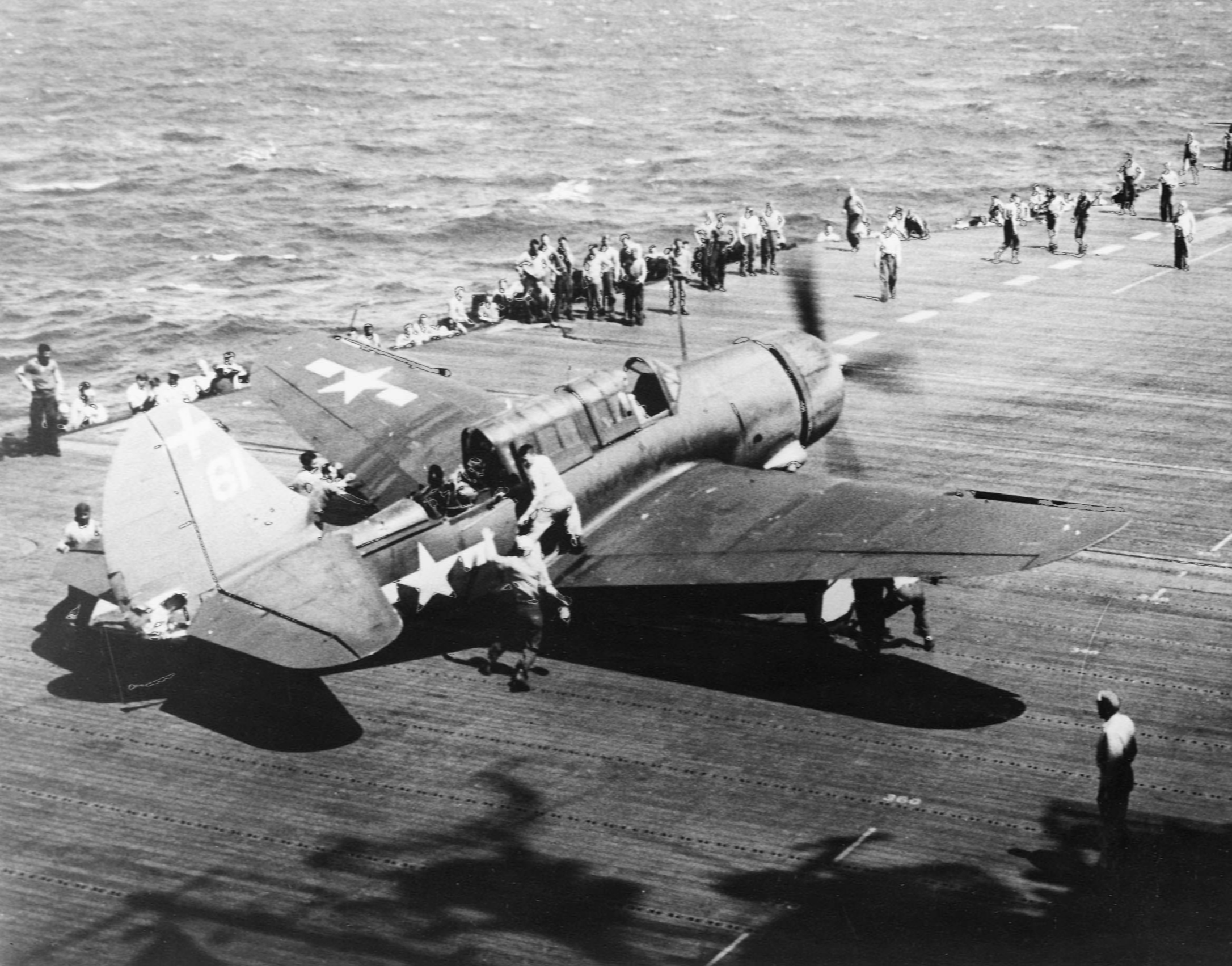
VB-18 SB2C-3 on USS Intrepid during the Battle of Leyte Gulf in 1944

- 5 February 1944: Lieutenant Commander Dickson, the squadron's commanding officer, was killed in a training exercise
- 12 October 1944: Squadron commanding officer, Commander Mark Eslick, was lost in combat during an attack on Kiirun Harbor, Formosa.
- 24–26 October 1944: The squadron participated in the Battle for Leyte Gulf, part of the operations surrounding the invasion of Leyte. On 24 October VB-18's SB2Cs flew sorties against a powerful Japanese surface force in the Sibuyan Sea. These attacks contributed to the sinking of the Japanese battleship Musashi, one of the two largest battleships in the world. Lieutenant Donald L. Wilson was awarded the Navy Cross for scoring a direct hit on a Japanese battleship during the battle. On 25 October the squadron's planes were part of a Fast Carrier Task Force that attacked the Japanese carrier force in the Battle off Cape Engaño. Four Japanese carriers were sunk during this engagement, the squadron's commanding officer, Lieutenant Commander George D. Ghesquiere was awarded the Navy Cross for leading his squadron in this battle and Lieutenant Benjamin G. Preston was awarded a Gold Star in lieu of his third Navy Cross for leading a division of dive bombers in this battle. On the 26th, squadron planes participated in attacks on the Japanese surface force which was retiring from the Battle off Samar.

=== Postwar ===
- September–December 1946: The squadron participated in USS Leyte's shake-down cruise in the Caribbean and a goodwill cruise to South America for the inauguration of Chile's president.
- 25 January 1949: the squadron conducted cross-deck operations with the British carrier HMS Triumph in the Mediterranean.

=== Korean War ===
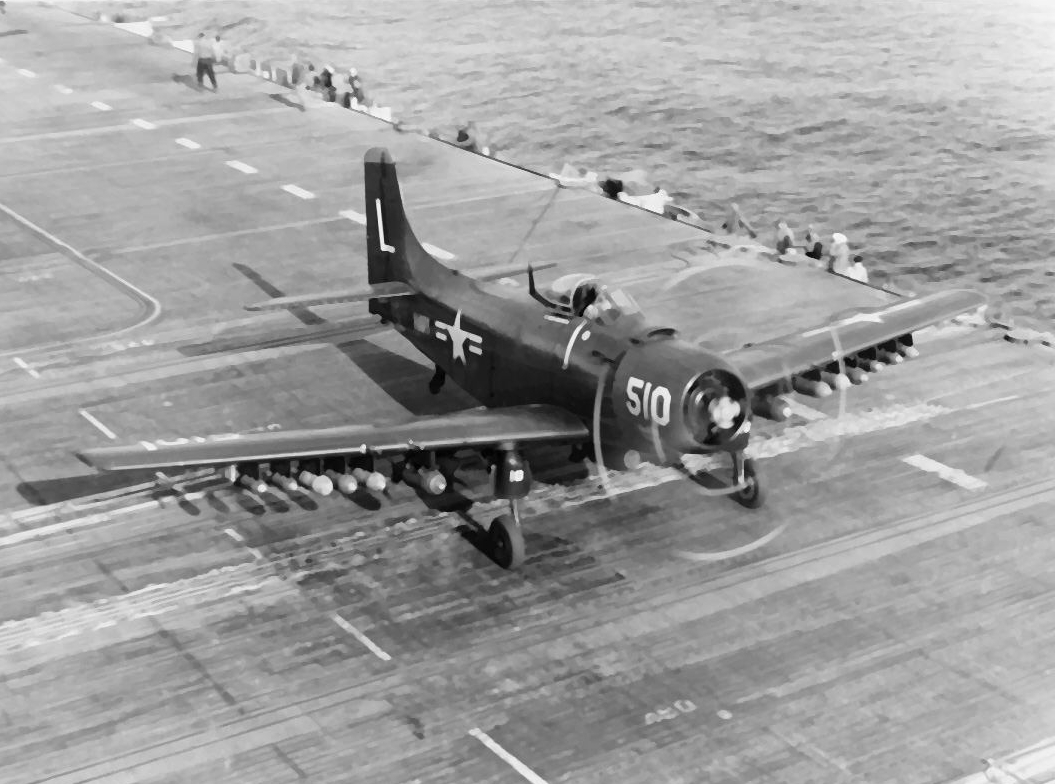
VA-75 AD-4 launches from USS Bon Homme Richard in 1952

- 23 June 1952: The squadron's first combat action in the Korean War was a joint operation with Air Group 7 and the U.S. Air Force in an attack against hydro-electric complexes in North Korea that had previously been restricted from attack.
- 11 July 1952: The squadron participated in a combined attack against Pyongyang, North Korea, with aircraft from CVG-7, USS Princeton, the U.S. Air Force, Marine Corps, Australian Air Force and British Royal Navy.
- 5 December 1952: On a strike against enemy troop concentrations the squadron's commanding officer, Commander H. K. Evans, was lost when his aircraft was hit by antiaircraft fire and crashed.

=== 1960s ===
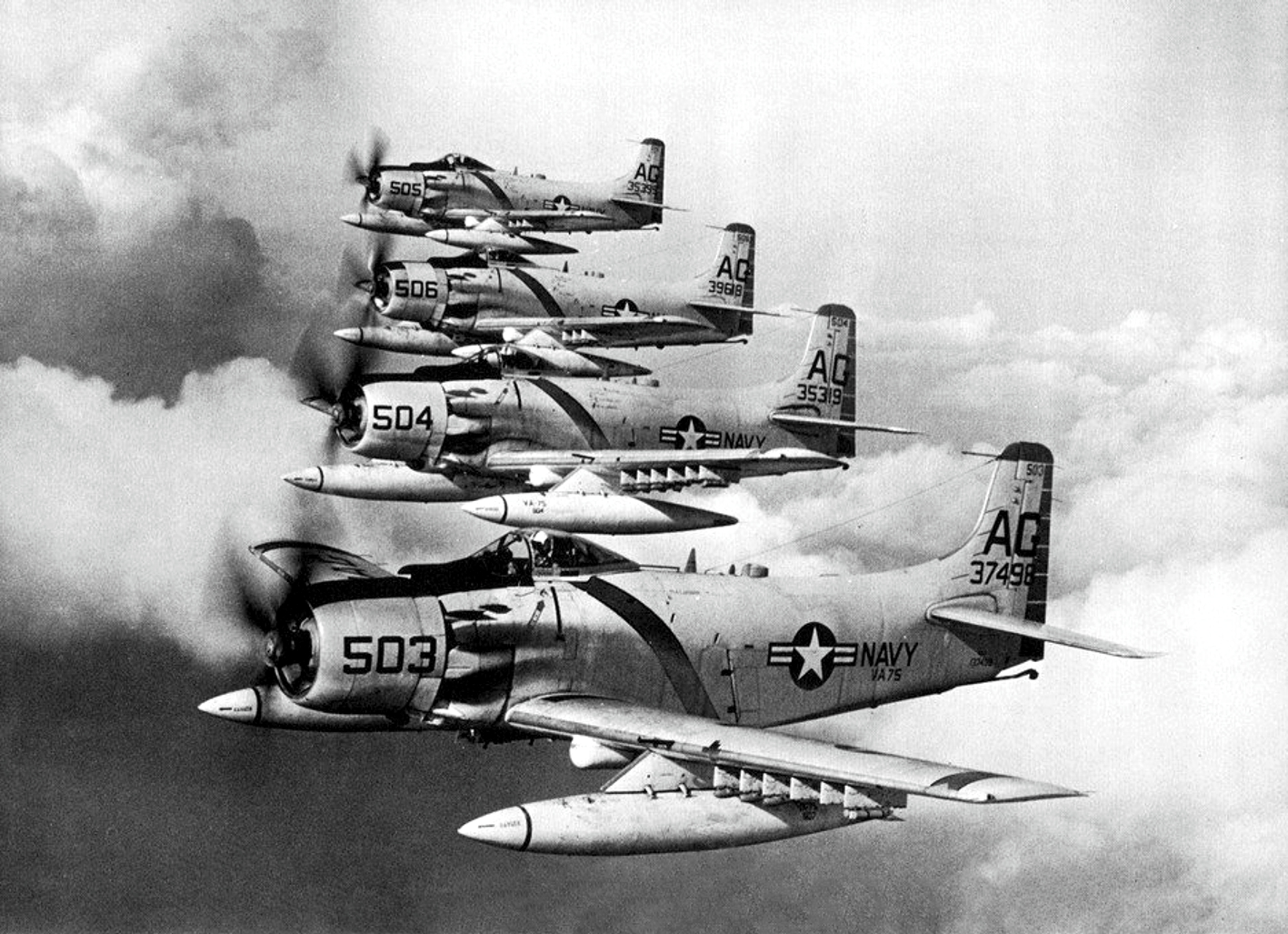
VA-75 AD-6s c.1960

- April 1961: The squadron operated from USS Independence in an area south of Guantanamo Bay, Cuba, during the Bay of Pigs Invasion
- 22 October–22 November 1962: Participated in the Cuban Quarantine while embarked on Independence.
- 14 November 1963: The first operational fleet squadron to be assigned the A-6A Intruder.

=== Vietnam War ===
- May–December 1965: Operating from Independence, VA-75 was the first squadron to deploy with the A-6A Intruder and operate the aircraft in a combat environment.
- 18 July 1965: The squadron commanding officer, Commander Jeremiah Denton, and bombardier-navigator LtJG Bill Tshudy, were captured after a combat mission over North Vietnam.
- 18 September 1965: The squadron's next commanding officer, Commander Leonard Vogt, and Lt. R.F. Barber, were killed while engaged in a night bombing attack Theon enemy patrol boats.
- 24 February 1968: Commander Jerrold M. Zacharias and Lieutenant Commander Michael L. Hall were awarded the Navy Cross for their action with VA-35 in planning and executing a coordinated A-6A strike on Hanoi.

=== 1970s ===
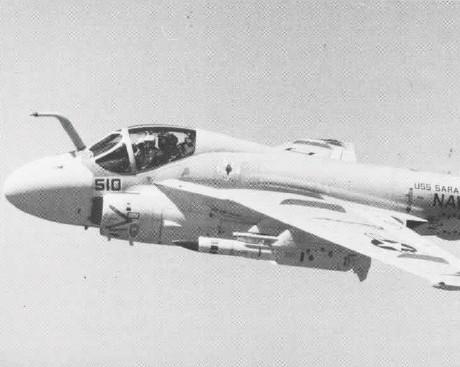
VA-75 A-6B flying from USS Saratoga in 1971

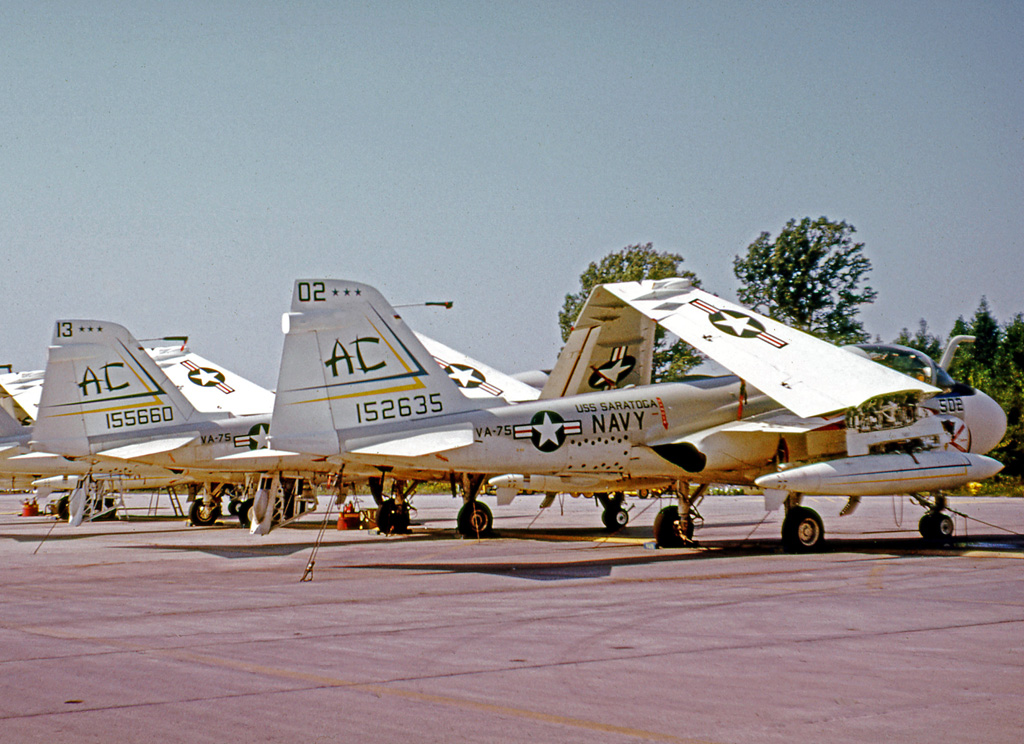
VA-75 A-6Es at NAS Oceana, in 1973

- September and October 1970: VA-75 operated from USS Saratoga while on station in the eastern Mediterranean during the Black September in Jordan
- 7 October 1971: VA-75 became the first A-6 squadron to drop sonobuoys. The integrated A-6A radar system and the A-6B antiradiation system were utilized for exact positioning and release of the sonobuoys. This event was part of an overall evaluation of the CV Concept being conducted by the Saratoga to determine the carrier's capability to operate effectively in both the attack and ASW roles.
- June–October 1972: Participated in Operation Linebacker, heavy air strikes against targets in North Vietnam and mining operations along coastal waters.
- 6 August 1972: Commander Charles Earnest and Lieutenant Commander Grady L. Jackson were awarded the Silver Star for directing a successful night inland rescue of a downed pilot in a heavily defended area of North Vietnam.
- 10 October 1972: Lieutenant Commander John A. Pieno and Lieutenant Junior Grade John R. Fuller were awarded the Silver Star for their actions as bombardier/navigators of a two plane attack, at dusk, on the North Vietnamese airfield of Bai Thong.
- 28 November 1972: The squadron's commanding officer, Commander Charles Earnest, was lost in an aircraft accident following a catapult launch from Saratoga while operating on Yankee Station.
- 19–29 December 1972: Participated in Operation Linebacker II
- 18 January 1975: Following violent demonstrations against the American Embassy in Nicosia, Cyprus, VA-75 operated from Saratoga off the coast of Cyprus.
- April 1976: As tensions increased in Lebanon, Saratoga and her air wing operated south of Crete, prepared to provide support for the evacuation of Americans from that country if it became necessary.

=== 1980s-1990s ===
- 8 January 1980: The squadron's commanding officer, Commander A. J. Lynch, and Lieutenant Charles J. Morrow were lost when their aircraft struck several parked planes during a night landing and careened into the sea.
- June 1982: Israel invaded Lebanon and USS John F. Kennedy was ordered to operate off the coast of Lebanon. VA-75 operated from the carrier, preparing for possible air support if it became necessary to evacuate Americans from Beirut, Lebanon.
- 4 December 1983: During Kennedy’s operations off the coast of Lebanon in support of the Multinational Peacekeeping Force, several of the carrier's F-14 reconnaissance aircraft received hostile fire from Syrian surface-to-air missile and anti-aircraft positions on 3 December. A retaliatory strike was flown by elements from CVW-3 and aircraft from Independence against the Syrian antiaircraft positions near Hammana, Lebanon. Three of VA-75's A-6Es participated in the strike and it also provided two KA-6D tanker aircraft for the operation.
- 6 February 1984: VA-75 dropped laser guided bombs in response to a request from U.S. Marines (part of the Multinational Peacekeeping Force) at the Beirut International Airport to suppress attacks against their positions.
- February 1987: With the increased tensions in Lebanon surrounding the American hostages, Kennedy was ordered to operate off the coast of Lebanon. VA-75 flew operations from the carrier in preparation for possible evacuation.
- January 1989: During routine training exercises off the northeastern tip of Libya, two F-14 Tomcats were approached by two Libyan Air Force MiG-23 jets, and after repeated attempts for a peaceful intercept, the F-14s shot down the Libyan aircraft. VA-75's KA-6D tankers provided refueling support for the two F-14s
- August 1989: During a training exercise, a squadron A-6E SWIP aircraft was the first to fire an AIM-9H Sidewinder air-to-air missile, scoring a direct hit with the missile.
- September–October 1990 and December 1990–January 1991: The squadron participated in Operation Desert Shield, the buildup of American and Allied forces to counter a threatened invasion of Saudi Arabia by Iraq and as part of an economic blockade of Iraq to force its withdrawal from Kuwait.
- January 1991-March 1991: The squadron then participated in Operation Desert Storm, the drive to push Iraqi forces out of Kuwait.
- 28 February 1997: Squadron disestablished after 53 years of service

== See also ==
- History of the United States Navy
- List of inactive United States Navy aircraft squadrons
- List of United States Navy aircraft squadrons
