= HC-2 (1948–1977) =

Helicopter Combat Support Squadron 2 (HC-2)
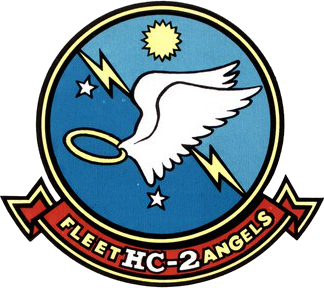
- Active: 1 April 1948 – 30 September 1977
- Country: United States
- Branch: United States Navy
- Type: Naval helicopter
- Size: Squadron
- Garrison/HQ: NAS Jacksonville
- Nickname: "Fleet Angels"

Helicopter Combat Support Squadron 2 (HC-2), also known as the "Fleet Angels", was a multi-role helicopter squadron of the United States Navy based at Naval Air Station Jacksonville. The squadron was established on 1 April 1948 and remained active until disestablished on 30 September 1977.

== History ==
Early experience with helicopters by the U.S. Navy began with Helicopter Development Squadron 3 (VX-3), which operated out of Naval Air Station Lakehurst, New Jersey (USA). With its decommissioning the U.S. Navy created its first two designated helicopter squadrons, Helicopter Utility Squadron 1 (HU-1) and HU-2 on 1 April 1948. Both squadrons were given the nickname "Fleet Angels" and their full designation was Helicopter Utility Squadron, reflecting the multiple missions that these squadrons were expected to be able to complete. In July 1965, HU-2 was re-designated Helicopter Combat Support Squadron 2 (HC-2). In October 1973, the squadron was relocated to Naval Air Station Jacksonville, Florida (USA), where on 30 September 1977, the squadron would be disestablished due to budget constraints following nearly 30 years of service.

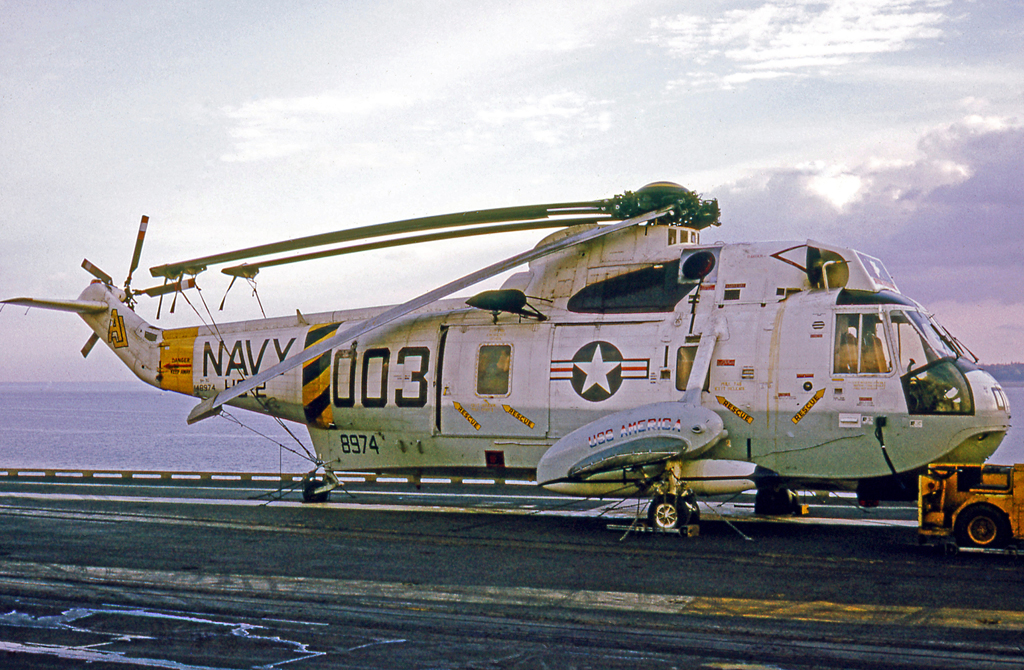
A Sikorsky SH-3G of HC-2 aboard USS America in 1974.

During the squadron's establishment, they would conduct a total of 2,318 rescues and achieve a list of naval helicopter firsts:

- First all-weather day/night detachment;
- First blimp rescue;
- First medical evacuation (MEDEVAC);
- First night Doppler rescue;
- First night full autorotation to a ship's flight deck;

After disestablishment, the squadron's traditions and the name "Fleet Angels" was picked up by the second HC-2 on 1 April 1987 at Naval Air Station Norfolk, Virginia, who continue to carry them to this day under the designation Helicopter Sea Combat Squadron 2 (HSC-2).

== See also ==
- History of the United States Navy
- List of inactive United States Navy aircraft squadrons
