= VT-18 (U.S. Navy) =

Torpedo Squadron 18
- Active: 20 July 1943 - 30 November 1949
- Country: United States
- Branch: United States Navy
- Type: Torpedo, later Attack
- Engagements: World War II

Aircraft flown
- Attack: TBF/M Avenger; AD-3 Skyraider

Torpedo Squadron 18, invariably known as VT-18, was a torpedo bomber squadron of the United States Navy. It was established in July 1943 and fought in the Battle of Leyte Gulf flying off the USS Intrepid (CV-11) as part of CVG-18. After the end of the war, in November 1946, it was redesignated, and just over 18 months later was redesignated a second time, and then after another 18 months it was disestablished.

The squadron was established as VT-18, the Carrier Clowns, on 20 July 1943. The squadron was redesignated as VA-8A on 15 November 1946, and finally as VA-75 on 27 July 1948. It was disestablished on 30 November 1949. A second squadron also bore the VA-75 designation.

== Operational history ==
- 24–26 October 1944: The squadron participated in the Battle for Leyte Gulf. On 24 October VT-18’s TBMs flew sorties against a powerful Japanese surface force in the Sibuyan Sea. These attacks contributed to the sinking of the Japanese battleship Musashi, one of the two largest battleships in the world. On 25 October, the squadron’s planes were part of a Fast Carrier Task Force that attacked a Japanese carrier force in the Battle off Cape Engaño. Four Japanese carriers were sunk during that engagement. On the 26th, squadron planes participated in an attack on the Japanese surface force which was retiring from the Battle off Samar.
- September–December 1946: The squadron participated in USS Leyte shakedown cruise in the Caribbean and a goodwill cruise to South America for the inauguration of Chile’s President Gabriel González Videla.

== Home port assignments ==
The squadron was assigned to these home ports, effective on the dates shown:

- Naval Air Station Alameda – 20 Jul 1943
- Naval Auxiliary Air Station Monterey – 28 Oct 1943*
- Naval Auxiliary Air Station Hollister – Nov 1943*
- Naval Air Station Hilo – Feb 1944*
- Naval Air Station Kaneohe Bay – Jun 1944*
- Naval Air Station Alameda – 20 Dec 1944
- Naval Air Station Astoria – 25 Jan 1945
- Naval Air Station San Diego – 22 Apr 1945
- Naval Air Station Quonset Point – 14 Nov 1945

* Temporary shore assignments while the squadron conducted training in preparation for combat deployment.

== Aircraft assignment ==
The squadron first received the following aircraft on the dates shown:

- TBF-1 Avenger – Jul 1943
- TBM-1 Avenger – Sep 1943
- TBM-1C Avenger – Nov 1943
- TBM-3 Avenger – Feb 1945
- TBM-3E Avenger – 22 Apr 1945
- TBM-3Q Avenger – 6 May 1946
- AD-3 Skyraider – 18 Apr 1949

== See also ==
- Attack aircraft
- List of inactive United States Navy aircraft squadrons
- History of the United States Navy
