= HC-1 =

Former helicopter squadron of the United States Navy

Helicopter Combat Support Squadron 1 (HC-1)
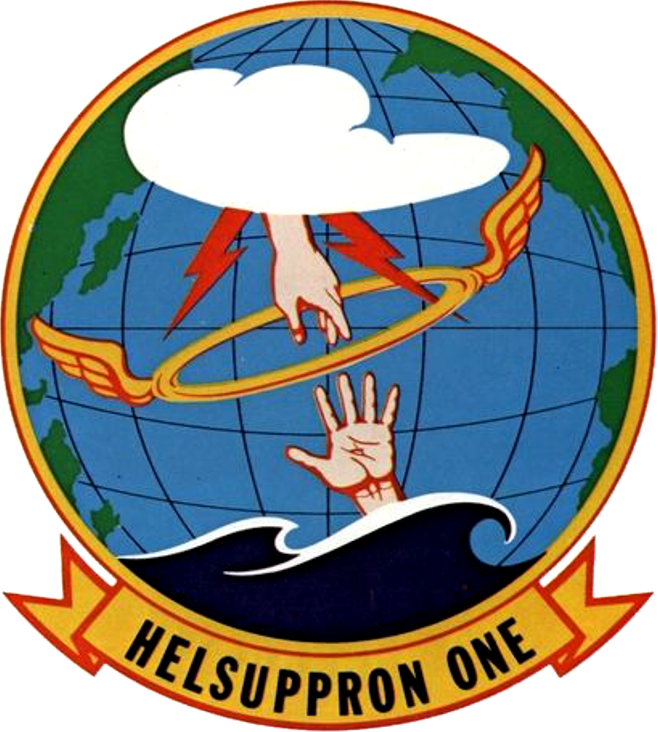
- Active: 1 April 1948 – 29 April 1994
- Country: United States of America
- Branch: United States Navy
- Type: Navy Helicopter Squadron
- Size: Squadron
- Garrison/HQ: NAS North Island
- Nickname(s): "Pacific Fleet Angels"
- Engagements: Vietnam War; Gulf War

Helicopter Combat Support Squadron 1 (HC-1) was a helicopter squadron of the United States Navy operating several helicopter types in support of United States Pacific Fleet ships and other units. The squadron was established on 1 April 1948 and disestablished on 29 April 1994. It was nicknamed "Pacific Fleet Angels" or just "Angels".

== History ==
Early experience with helicopters by the Navy was developed by Helicopter Development Squadron THREE (VX-3) which operated out of Naval Air Station Lakehurst, New Jersey. This led to the creation of the service's first two designated helicopter squadrons, Helicopter Utility Squadron (HU-1) and HU-2 on 1 April 1948.

As the Navy changed the scope of roles for its utility helicopter squadrons, it also re-designated them Helicopter Combat Support Squadrons. HU-1 was duly re-designated HC-1 on 1 July 1965.

Performing SAR and flying SH3G and CH53E helos, HC-1 operated out of Naval Air Station North Island - NASNI - in Coronado, CA. Fleet Angels. So Others May Live.

A detachment of HC-1 participated in Operation Desert Storm aboard USS Tarawa and during its return played a key role assisting civilians in aftermath of the 1991 Bangladesh cyclone.

The squadron was disestablished on 29 April 1994.

== Equipment ==
The squadron has operated several types during its history:

- Sikorsky HO3S
- Sikorsky HO4S
- Piasecki HUP Retriever
- Sikorsky UH-34D/E Seahorse
- Kaman UH-2A/B/C Seasprite
- Boeing-Vertol UH-46 Sea Knight
- Sikorsky SH-3G/UH-3H Sea King
- Sikorsky CH-53E Super Stallion

== See also ==
- History of the United States Navy
- List of inactive United States Navy aircraft squadrons
