= USS Koelsch =

Garcia-class frigate

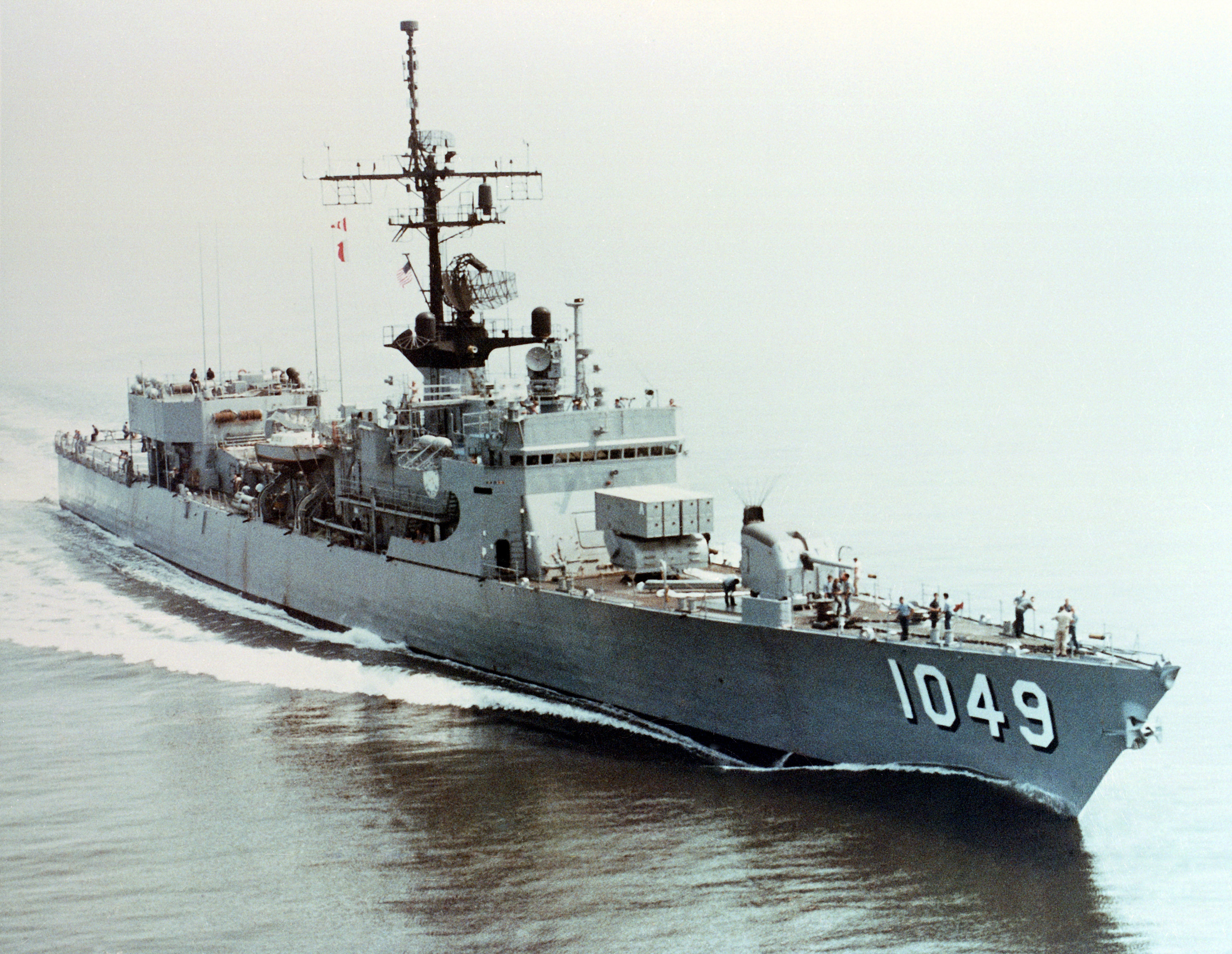
- USS Koelsch (FF-1049)

History

United States
- Name: Koelsch
- Namesake: John Kelvin Koelsch
- Ordered: 21 March 1963
- Builder: Defoe Shipbuilding Company, Bay City, Michigan
- Laid down: 19 February 1964
- Launched: 8 June 1965
- Acquired: 23 May 1967
- Commissioned: 19 October 1968
- Decommissioned: 31 May 1989
- Stricken: 19 August 1994
- Motto: Valor [and] Versatility.
- Fate: Scrapped 1994

Pakistan
- Name: Siqqat
- Acquired: 31 May 1989
- Out of service: Returned to US custody, 19 August 1994
- Identification: F267
- Fate: Returned to US custody

General characteristics
- Class & type: Garcia-class frigate
- Displacement: 2,624 tons (light); 3,400 tons full
- Length: 414 ft 6 in (126.34 m)
- Beam: 44 ft 1 in (13.44 m)
- Draft: 24 ft 6 in (7.47 m)
- Propulsion: 2 Foster-Wheeler boilers, 1 steam turbine, 35,000 shp (26,000 kW), single screw
- Speed: 27 knots (50 km/h; 31 mph)
- Range: 4,000 nautical miles (7,400 km; 4,600 mi) at 20 knots (37 km/h; 23 mph)
- Complement: 16 officers; 231 enlisted
- Sensors & processing systems: AN/SPS-40 air search radar; AN/SPS-10 surface search radar; AN/SQS-26 bow mounted sonar
- Armament: 2 × single 5 in (127 mm)/38 cal. Mk 30 guns; 1 × 8-tube ASROC Mk16 launcher (16 missiles); 2 × triple 12.75 in (324 mm) Mk 32 torpedo tubes, Mk 46 torpedoes; 2 × MK 37 torpedo tubes (fixed, stern) (removed later)
- Aircraft carried: Gyrodyne QH-50 (planned) / SH-2 LAMPS

USS Koelsch (FF-1049) was a Garcia-class frigate in service with the United States Navy from 1968 to 1989. She was then leased to Pakistan where she served as Siqqat (F-267) until 1994. The frigate was subsequently scrapped.

== History ==
Koelsch (DE-1049) was laid down as a destroyer escort on 19 February 1964 at Bay City, Michigan, by Defoe Shipbuilding Company and launched on 8 June 1965, sponsored by Miss Virginia L. Koelsch, niece of the late Lt. (j.g.) Koelsch. the ship conducted builders' trials on Lake Huron on 14–15 April 1967 and departed Bay City on 11 May 1967. She transited the Great Lakes and the St. Lawrence Seaway, and was commissioned at the Boston Navy Yard, Massachusetts, USA, on 10 June 1967.

=== United States Navy ===
==== 1960s ====
With Newport, Rhode Island, designated as her home port, Koelsch spent the rest of 1967 at Boston, Massachusetts, much of it in drydock, fitting-out, workmen covering the teardrop-shaped sonar dome with an experimental rubber coating; installing the Antisubmarine Warfare Ship Command and Control System (ASWC&CS); replacing eight superheater tube stubs on 1A boiler; and removing the Drone Antisubmarine Helicopter (DASH) equipment in preparation for the ship's receiving a crewed helicopter capability.

Koelsch deployed on a Northern European-Mediterranean cruise, departing from Naval Station Newport on 20 August 1968 and returning on 19 December. During the deployment, she visited Southampton(United Kingdom|(UK)]] (3-9 September); Stavanger, Norway (11-16 September); Hamburg, Germany (1-7 October); Lisbon, Portugal (21-24 October); Naples, Italy (1-7 November); Barcelona, Spain (2-7 December); and Gibraltar (9-11 December).

From 14 January to 22 March 1969, Koelsch remained at Boston undergoing post-shakedown availability (PSA). On 1 April, she departed her home port for the Virginia Capes to conduct individual exercises and type training. On 1 May, Koelsch again departed Newport, refueling in the Azores, to join the antisubmarine warfare carrier USS Wasp's task group operating in the eastern Atlantic. All ships of the force anchored off Spithead, between Portsmouth (UK) and the Isle of Wright, on 14 May to be reviewed two days later by Queen Elizabeth II from the royal yacht HMY Britannia. After a five-day visit at Cherbourg, France, the destroyer escort rejoined Wasp on 22 May to conduct Hunter-Killer Group (HuKGru) operations and to evaluate the installed Antisubmarine Warfare Tactical Data System (ASWTDS) west of Ireland. Koelsch continued those operations until departing for Newport on 5 July, interrupted by port visits to Oslo, Norway (4-7 June) and Amsterdam, The Netherlands (23-30 June). The ship returned to Newport on 11 July, entering an upkeep period soon thereafter. She participated in operations Squeeze Play I (15-24 October) and Squeeze Play II (1-12 December), conducting ASW exercises off United States East Coast.

==== 1970s ====
Koelsch departed Newport on 5 February 1970 to participate in Squeeze Play III in the western Atlantic. She then conducted experimental ASW exercises and visited Bermuda twice (14–16 February and 22–23 February), before returning home on 2 March. On 13 April, she got underway for two weeks of independent exercises off the Virginia Capes punctuated by a liberty weekend at Naval Station Norfolk, Virginia (USA), which commenced on 17 April. The ship participated in Squeeze Play IV (18–28 May) and Squeeze Play V (8–21 June) off the east coast of the United States. Commander Cruiser-Destroyer Force, Atlantic (ComCruDesLant) awarded Koelsch the Rhode Island Navy League's Anti Submarine Warfare Trophy for her performance in the Squeeze Play evaluations, marking her as the outstanding ASW ship in the Atlantic Fleet.

Koelsch and her crew attended the Maine Lobster Festival at Rockland, Maine (31 July – 3 August 1970) before acting on special orders during her return voyage to Newport, searching for and apprehending three enlisted people allegedly deserting to Canada in a pleasure craft, and turning them over to the Naval Criminal Investigative Service at Newport. The crew prepared their ship for a regular overhaul period by offloading ammunition at the Naval Weapons Station Earle, New Jersey, on 10 August and beginning a tender availability at Newport (21 August – 14 September). Koelsch remained at Boston Naval Shipyard for overhaul from 15 September to 21 December, a yard period broken by sea trials on 9 and 10 December.

The ship loaded ammunition at Naval Weapons Station Earle (18–19 January 1971) in preparation for refresher training at Guantanamo Bay, Cuba. She visited Naval Station Roosevelt Roads, Puerto Rico, for Weapons System Acceptance Trials (WSAT) (23–26 January) and Saint Croix (27–31 January). Koelsch then spent the next seven weeks in refresher training at Guantanamo Bay, broken up by a port visit to Kingston, Jamaica (14–15 February). Reports of a Soviet submarine tender off Bahia de Nipe, Cuba, resulted in another interruption in her slate of training on 10 March, when she received orders to proceed immediately to those waters. Koelsch relieved USS Thomas J. Gary on station early on 11 March, and patrolled outside the harbor observing and reporting all shipping activities for the next 24 hours, when she was relieved and returned to Guantanamo Bay to complete her refresher training. The ship returned to Newport on 29 March.

Getting underway again on 26 April 1971 and returning to Newport on 11 May, Koelsch conducted special towed array sonar tests in Exuma Sounds in the Bahamas. The ship participated in two midshipmen training periods (17 June – 18 July and 29 August – 22 September) that involved underway periods of up to eight hours per day, three or four days per week. Participation in Squeeze Play exercises (19–31 July) broke up the midshipmen training periods. The ship later participated in LantCorTEx evaluations (23 September-6 October), type training (18–29 October), and combined Canadian-United States exercises (1–16 November).

Following an upkeep period and type training in local waters, Koelsch got underway from Newport on 10 March 1972 for a six-week operation with the Spanish and Portuguese navies off the Iberian Peninsula. After conducting ASW operations with the Spanish Navy, the ship put into Rota, Spain, on 30 March for a six-day port visit. Koelsch conducted ASW operations with the Portuguese Navy followed by a three-day visit to Porto, Portugal, and returned to Newport on 23 April. The ship got underway on 16 May for type training with other units of Destroyer Squadron (DesRon) 24, but found it necessary to moor at the Norfolk Naval Base (18–22 May) to conduct engineering repairs before completing the training and returning to Newport on 25 May.

Koelsch departed her homeport on 14 June 1972 for her first extended deployment to the Mediterranean Sea, arriving at Rota, on 22 June. Underway later that day, the ship participated in task force operations until 6 July, interrupted by an anchorage at off Las Palmas (31 June – 1 July) and a medical evacuation at Naples (25–26 June). After a week of liberty at Palma de Mallorca, the ship conducted operations at sea (14–21 July) followed by an upkeep period at Naples. From there, Koelsch departed for the Aegean Sea to conduct carrier and ASW operations with port visits to Limnos, Greece (10–13 August) and Athens (21–26 August). Pausing at Palma on 2 September, the ship participated in a two-day NATO ASW operation prior to picking up a Navy Band at Barcelona to take part in a religious festival at Mahón, Menorca. Remaining at Mahón from 6 to 9 September, the ship then visited Rota on 12 September before returning to the Aegean to participate in a NATO amphibious exercise in the vicinity of Alexandroupoli, Greece. Koelsch then conducted boiler repairs at Athens (26–28 September). Rendezvousing with other ASW forces, she conducted two days of operations followed by a port visit to Sfax, Tunisia (2–5 October). Reaching Barcelona on 7 October, the ship spent the next two weeks in a leave and upkeep period. Koelsch then participated in carrier and aircraft operations in the Tyrrhenian Sea (21-30 October), and following a two-day visit to Naples, conducted "special operations" along the Albanian Adriatic Sea Coast. She then participated in her second National Week exercise concluding with a two-day anchorage at Souda Bay, Crete. Arriving at Livorno, Italy, on 23 November for a five-day holiday port visit, the ship stopped at Toulon, France (29 November – 5 December) before heading to Gibraltar for a turnover of operational orders. Coming under the command of the United States Second Fleet on 10 December, Koelsch departed Gibraltar and arrived back at Newport on 18 December.

Koelsch participated in Sharem XIV exercises in the western Atlantic Ocean for evaluation of sonar tactics (5–11 March 1973), then carried out type training with DesRon 24 (16–20 April) and with four French ships of the standing NATO force (3–9 June), followed by a stint of midshipman training (10–16 June and 23–29 June). The ship and crew celebrated the Fourth of July at Bristol, Rhode Island, having transported 75 local dignitaries as guests on 29 June, then remaining anchored off the port until 5 July. The ship's sailors participated in the Bristol parade, one of the oldest in the country, and were guests at picnics, dances, and cocktail parties. From 24 July to 19 August the ship operated in and out of Newport for Destroyer School training cruises. Koelsch departed Newport on 20 August and arrived at her new homeport of Naval Station Mayport, Florida on 26 August. During September, the ship's crew, with assistance from Naval Ordnance Systems Support Office Atlantic and Mobile Technical Unit 12, replaced both 5"/38 gun mounts with reconditioned ones from the Naval Ammunition Depot Crane, Indiana. The ship departed Mayport on 1 October for refresher training at Guantanamo Bay, Cuba, and on 18 and 19 October the ship qualified in naval gunfire support at Culebra Island. Returning to her homeport on 21 October, Koelsch spent the next two and a half weeks preparing for her second extended deployment, this time to the Indian Ocean.

Getting underway on 15 November 1973, Koelsch rendezvoused with USS Brumby at Roosevelt Roads on 18 November before they crossed the Atlantic Ocean in company and visited Dakar, Senegal (27–28 November) and Freetown, Sierra Leone (30 November – 5 December), hosting President Saika Stevens of Sierra Leone during the latter visit (4 December). The ship crossed Equator on 7 December, and Neptunus Rex initiated 178 members of her crew into the "Order of the Royal Shellbacks" during the ship's first Line-crossing ceremony. Refueling from British fleet oilers RFA Tidespring (A75) and RFA Tidereach (A96), Koelsch and Brumby joined USS Charles F. Adams and USS McCandless three days before Christmas in the Indian Ocean. All four ships refueled from USS Wichita (AOR-1) before arriving at Port Louis, Mauritius on 24 December.

Koelsch visited Le Port, Réunion (3–9 January 1974) before joining USS Bainbridge and USS Schofield for exercises that lasted until 25 January. She then steamed independently to make port calls at Massawa, Ethiopia (8–12 February) and Bahrain (23 February-6 March). The ship crossed the Persian Gulf to Bandar Abbas, Iran, on 6 March to participate in combined exercises with units of the Royal Navy and Navy of Iran. She gave a tour to some thirty students on 7 March. In port from 6 to 9 March for pre-exercise briefings, Koelsch joined USS La Salle (AGF-3), Brumby, HMS Scylla (F71), HMS Ariadne (F72), HMS Danae (F47), and the Iranian vessels Saam (DE-12), Zaal (DE-14), Kannamouie (F-28), and Milanian (F-27) for exercises (9–12 March). The ship spent six days at Karachi, Pakistan beginning on 12 March where she exchanged visits with members of the Navy of Pakistan. Koelsch spent a final week at Bahrain, arriving on 21 March, before getting underway for the long journey home. The ship rendezvoused with Brumby on 9 April at Mombasa, Kenya, for a turnover of Middle East Force duties with USS Paul and USS Mullinnix. Koelsch and Brumby operated in company during the voyage around the Cape of Good Hope to Mayport, making routine stops at Laurenco Marques, Mozambique (13–15 April), Luanda, Angola (22–24 April), Monrovia, Liberia (29 April – 1 May), Recife, Brazil (5–7 May), Port of Spain, Trinidad (12–13 May), and Roosevelt Roads (14–15 May) before reaching home on 18 May.

Koelsch entered a Regular Overhaul (ROH) period at Charleston Naval Shipyard, South Carolina, on 17 June 1974. Originally scheduled for completion on 20 December, additional authorized work kept the ship in port until 19 March 1975. Work authorized during the overhaul included the installation of: SPS-40D air search radar, tactical air navigation system (TACAN), Sewage Collection Holding and Transfer (CHT) system, Aqueous Film Forming Foam (AFFF) machinery space fire fighting system, and rubberized AN/SQS-26(BX) sonar dome. The ship also received major boiler and supercharger repairs, Impressed Current Cathodic Hull Protection (ICCHP) system procedure, and received a helicopter hangar and deck for the Kaman SH-2 Seasprite Light Airborne Multi-Purpose System(LAMPS).

Returning to Mayport on 22 March 1975, Koelsch got underway again on 5 May to undergo Weapons System Acceptance Tests (WSAT) prior to equipment checkout and training at the Atlantic Undersea Test and Evaluation Center (AUTEC) range at Andros Island, Bahamas. During the AUTEC period (9–12 May), the ship fired four exercise torpedoes and two ASROC missiles. After spending two days assisting submarines USS Glenard P. Lipscomb and USS Tinosa (SSN-606) with exercises, Koelsch entered port at Jacksonville, Florida on 16 May and received her first LAMPS helicopter, a Kaman SH-2 Seasprite (BuNo 152206) of HSL-34. On 30 June 1975, Koelsch was redesignated as a frigate, "FF-1049". Following a visit to the degaussing range at Charleston on 7 July, the ship conducted refresher training at Guantanamo Bay, and on 15 August joined other U.S. Navy vessels for CaribEx 1-76. During this period, the Koelsch qualified in naval gunfire support (NGFS) at the Vieques Weapons Range on 18 August and conducted ASW operations with submarines USS Sandlance (24 August) and USS Andrew Jackson (28 August). After successfully passing her Operational Propulsion Examination (OPPE) (9–10 October), the frigate participated in two major exercises involving units from Mayport, Charleston, and Norfolk: CompTUEx 3-76 (16–24 October) and CompTUEx 4-76 (17–26 November). The ship received a Combat Systems Readiness Review (CSRR), designed to groom all of the frigate's weapons systems (1–12 December).

After providing services to two submarines in the Charleston operating area (9–11 January 1976), Koelsch conducted ASW operations in CaribEx 2-76.(15 January – 15 February). The ship departed Mayport on 14 April for a major deployment to the Mediterranean, spending her first two weeks with the United States Sixth Fleet participating in NATO ASW exercise Open Gate 76. Following a two-week tender availability at Naples, Italy that began on 7 May, the ship participated in another ASW exercise Sharem XXI. The crew enjoyed five days at Brindisi, Italy, after which the ship received orders on 7 June to conduct a surveillance-oriented mission east of Crete. Koelsch steamed to a position southeast of Crete to stand by in alert status for Fluid Drive I, the first evacuation of American citizens from Beirut, Lebanon (19–21 June). The ship ended the month with a six-day visit to Syracuse, Sicily. After celebrating the United States Bicentennial at Messina, Sicily, the frigate got underway on 7 July to participate in ASW exercises that lasted until she arrived at Kithera Strait, off Greece, on the 19th. The same day the ship received orders to rendezvous with amphibious forces to participate in Fluid Drive II, the second U.S. evacuation from Beirut. Following another tender availability at Naples (3–17 August), Koelsch joined ASW-oriented exercise Galaxy Griddle, coinciding with surveillance missions, that lasted until 1 September. After a visit to Barcelona, Spain (5–14 September), the frigate spent the next nine days participating in ASW operation Side Saddle in addition to surveillance missions at Kithera. During her final two weeks in the Mediterranean Sea, the ship participated in Display Determination, a major NATO exercise. Turning over to USS Valdez and USS Julius A. Furer (14–15 October), Koelsch returned to Mayport on 25 October.

From 15 November 1976 to 15 January 1977, the ship received major modifications and repairs to the installed ASW tactical data system and to her propulsion plant. Koelsch got underway on 19 January with Detachment 6 of HSL-36 to participate in CaribEx 1-77, that included ASW operations and weapons systems qualifications. After a three-day visit to Port of Spain, Trinidad, beginning on 31 January, the ship completed NGFS qualifications at Vieques (3-4 February) and returned to Mayport on 11 February. Getting underway again on the 28th, the frigate reached Norfolk on 2 March for eleven days of upkeep and preparation for the western Atlantic ASW exercise Operation Cleansweep (14–25 March). After two months of tender and restricted availabilities at Mayport, Koelsch participated in ASW exercises in the Narragansett Bay operational area off Rhode Island during the first week of June. While preparing for and receiving the Combat Systems Readiness Review (CSRR), she acted as the host ship to the Spanish frigate Extremadura (F75) visiting Mayport. Koelsch operated with carrier USS Saratoga in carrier task group training off Charleston (24–27 June) and on 30 June held a dependents' cruise off Jacksonville.

Embarking Detachment 6 of HSL-36 on 8 July 1977, the ship departed Mayport three days later with Saratoga to deploy to the Mediterranean. Arriving at Gibraltar on 21 July for a three visit, the frigate participated in ASW Week I (25-31 July), Sharem XXIII (1–10 August), and National Week beginning 15 July. Sharem XXIII was used to gather raw data on submarine tracking for later analysis, and National Week was designed to evaluate tactical doctrine in a wartime scenario involving predominately U.S. ships. Following an extended port visit at Naples (25 August-8 September), Koelsch took part in gunfire exercises and ASW operations in the eastern Mediterranean and Ionian basin, as well as visited the Greek resort island of Skaithos (20–23 September), reportedly the first call by a U.S. warship in eight years. The ship then joined NATO forces in the multinational exercise Display Determination 77 before visiting Taranto, Italy (8–14 October). After visiting Palma de Mallorca (16–27 October), the frigate took part in ASW Week II, concluding on 4 November, followed by visits to Ibiza, Balearic Islands (7 November) and Cartagena, Spain (8–13 November). Koelsch stopped at Toulon, France on 16 November for briefings in preparation for NATO exercise Iles D'or 77 (16–25 November). The ship paid her final Mediterranean port visit to Saint Tropez, France, from 26 November to 4 December. She participated in ASW exercise Poopdeck 2-77 while in transit to Rota for turnover with the guided missile cruiser USS California on the 9th. Conducting various exercises with Saratoga during the return voyage, the ship arrived at Mayport on 23 December.

Koelsch embarked Detachment 6 of HSL-36 on 1 February 1978 to participate in ReadiEx 1-78, including NGFS qualifications at Vieques (13–14 February) and a visit to St. John's, Antigua and Barbuda (18–21 February). The exercise lasted until the 26th, and the ship arrived back at Mayport on 1 March. She got underway again on the 8th to participate in an exercise that was eventually cancelled. Directed to unload all her ammunition at Naval Weapons Station, Yorktown, Va., Koelsch returned home on 15 March to begin preparations for her regularly scheduled overhaul (ROH). Many weapons system components were removed including the forward and aft gun mounts, the gunfire control director, ASROC launcher, torpedo tubes, Mark 53 Attack Console, and the Mark 4 Gunfire Control System Console. The ship arrived at Bethlehem Steel Shipyard at Baltimore, Md., on 3 April for her ROH. Major work included the replacement of all weapons systems components removed at Mayport with refurbished units, modification of her sonar dome to a rubber window configuration, and the updating of the Naval Tactical Data System (NTDS) to a Mod. 4 program.

After conducting sea trials in the Chesapeake Bay and Virginia capes operations areas, Koelsch ended her ROH and departed Baltimore, Maryland on 27 June 1979, onloaded ammunition at Naval Weapons Station Yorktown, and reached Mayport on 1 July. During July and August the ship participated in training two groups of United States Naval Academy and Naval Reserve Officers Training Corps midshipmen in addition to type training, Weapons System Acceptance Tests (WSAT), and sound trials. She took part in CompTUEx 1-80 (1–12 October) including Naval Gunfire Support (NGFS) qualifications at Vieques. From 13 October to 26 November, the frigate prepared for overseas deployment including the replacement of her SQR-17 sonar with an SQS-54.

==== 1980s ====
On 27 November 1979, Koelsch got underway for a five-month deployment to the Mediterranean. Following a turnover and briefing period at Rota (9-13 December), she took part in ASW and task group operations as part of a battle group consisting of carrier USS Forrestal, guided missile cruiser USS Wainwright, guided missile destroyer USS Tattnall, and frigates USS Paul and USS Connole (13-22 December). The ship made a holiday port visit to Toulon in company with destroyer USS Spruance (23 December 1979 – 4 January 1980). After participating in more battle group operations (4-9 January) and a visit to Brindisi, Italy, Koelsch moved to a training anchorage at Souda Bay, Crete, with the rest of Forrestal's battle group (19-21 January). The frigate then participated in PhibLEx 3–80 at Voies, Greece. The ship paid a four-day visit to Catania, Sicily prior to departure for the Middle East in company with Tattnall. Transiting the Suez Canal (2-3 February), the two ships relieved guided missile destroyer USS Semmes and frigate USS Glover at Suez, Egypt, followed by a refueling stop at Djibouti on the 7th and surveillance operations off Socotra Island. Koelsch crossed the equator on 12 February as Neptunus Rex initiated 15 officers and 172 enlisted crewmen into the Order of the Royal Shellbacks in a "Crossing the Line" ceremony. The ship called at Mombasa, Kenya (13-23 February), a port visit punctuated by her participation as a range recovery ship for the launch of a NASA sounding rocket to observe the 1980 solar eclipse (15-18 February). After refueling at Djibouti on the 28th, Koelsch proceeded to the Gulf of Aden where she conducted surveillance operations, refueling again at Djibouti on 7 March. Returning to Socotra Island, she conducted surveillance of a Soviet Navy ASW task group, followed by a transit to the Arabian Sea and a week of operations in the Straits of Hormuz. The frigate visited Bahrain (21-25 March) followed by operations in the Persian Gulf with USS La Salle and Brumby. Refueling at Djibouti on 31 March, Koelsch transited the Suez Canal on 5 April, and put in to Naples on the 8th. During that time, the frigate conducted surveillance of the Soviet helicopter carrier Leningrad and her escorts. Destroyer tender USS Yosemite provided an Intermediate Maintenance Availability (IMAV) in Naples (8-22 April), and Koelsch rejoined Forrestal's battle group at Rota on 25 April. Departing Rota for the trans-Atlantic voyage home two days later, the battle group arrived at Mayport on 7 May 1980.

On 2 July 1980 the ship sortied for operations with the Joint Caribbean Task Force, returning to Mayport on 8 July. ReadiEx 2-80 (9 July-8 August), provided the frigate the opportunity to practice Anti-air Warfare (AAW) and Surface Warfare (SUW) operations, interspersed with visits to Roosevelt Roads (17-21 July) and Charlotte Amalie, U.S. Virgin Islands (1-3 August). Koelsch participated in CompTUEx 5-80 from 30 September prior to entering a pre-overseas movement period on 17 October, with sea trials on 15 November. During that time the ship received significant additions to her electronic support measures, communications, and navigations systems, including an SLR-12A, two KY8s, one KY-75, and an SRN-19.

Koelsch sailed for the Mediterranean and Middle East on 18 November 1980 in company with guided missile destroyers USS Barney and USS Luce, destroyers USS Nicholson, USS John Rodgers, USS John Hancock, frigate USS W.S. Sims, ammunition ship USS Butte, and oiler USS Canisteo. After pausing briefly at Rota (29 November-1 December), the frigate proceeded to Barcelona, where she received an Intermediate Maintenance Availability (IMAV) (5-15 December), followed by participating, with all Sixth Fleet surface units, in an antisubmarine sweep of the western Med. Following a brief visit to Gaeta, Italy (18 December), Koelsch steamed independently to join Commander Middle East Force in the Persian Gulf. Transiting the Suez Canal two days before Christmas, the ship refueled at Djibouti on 26 December and stood in to the Persian Gulf on 30 December, relieving frigate USS Patterson. From 31 December, Koelsch conducted patrols in the Strait of Hormuz followed by operations on radar picket station in the Persian Gulf and a visit to Bahrain (21-30 January 1981). After resuming radar picket and patrol operations in the Strait of Hormuz during February, the ship returned to the Mediterranean, arriving at Naples on 18 March. Following a routine IMAV, the frigate departed on 15 April for United States, with refueling stops in the Azores and from USS Sylvania, arriving at Mayport on 28 April.

Koelsch remained in port until 15 June 1981 when she conducted operations in the western Atlantic, including visits to Albany, New York, and Newport, Rhode Island, before she returned home on 27 June. The ship departed Mayport on 14 July to augment the UNITAS XXII battle group in the South Atlantic, visiting Saint Kitts in the West Indies en route. After visiting Recife, Brazil (3-5 August) and Rio de Janeiro (12-16 August), the frigate conducted battle group operations with various units of the U.S. and Brazilian navies, and returned to Mayport on 31 August. Following two months of Inspection and Survey (INSURV) related activity, Koelsch participated in ReadiEx 1–82 in the Northern Puerto Rican Operations Area (1-24 November).

On 27 January 1982, the ship departed Mayport to return to the Mediterranean and Middle East, reaching Rota on 7 February. After a visit to Algeciras, Spain (9-13 February), Koelsch entered the western Mediterranean and conducted ASW work prior to entering an Intermediate Maintenance Availability (IMAV) at Gaeta (16-27 February). Departing for assignment to Commander, Middle East Force, the frigate transited the Suez Canal on 3 March, received fuel at Djibouti, entered the Persian Gulf on 12 March, and performed radar picket duties until 27 April. After a three-day visit at Bahrain, the ship ended the Middle Eastern portion of her cruise, refueling at Djibouti on 5 May, and transiting the Suez Canal on 9 May. After refueling at Augusta Bay (Sicily), Koelsch visited Syracuse (14-22 May). The ship began another IMAV at Naples (24-28 May) and completed it at Gaeta (28 May-7 June). After departing Gaeta, the frigate spent the rest of the month operating with other Sixth Fleet ships off the coast of Lebanon before returning to Rota on 30 June. The ship departed Rota on 4 July and arrived back at Mayport on the 14th.

Except for local operations off the coast of Florida (15-18 September 1982), Koelsch remained at her home port until 13 October, when she proceeded to Charleston for weapons offload prior to departing for New York on 15 October. The ship and crew visited Manhattan (18-20 October), and then entered the facilities of the Coastal Drydock and Repair Corporation in the Brooklyn Navy Yard for an eleven-month regular overhaul (ROH). Major installations included a single audio system, seven UHF transceivers, and new high pressure air compressors. On 4 April, a steam boiler exploded killing a worker and slightly injuring three other people, including a Navy lieutenant.

Contractor delays pushed Koelsch's light-off examination from 19 August to 8–9 September 1983. The ship completed dock trials (20-21 October) and sea trials (21-22 October) off the coast of Long Island. Stopping at Earle, New Jersey, for ammunition onload (25 October), the frigate arrived at Mayport three days later. Following a month of inspections and examinations, the ship conducted a post-ROH shakedown and independent steaming exercises in the Jacksonville operations area from 29 November to 2 December. Following a NWAT visit (5-9 December), Koelsch provided submarine services (12 and 28 December).

The ship departed Mayport on 4 January 1984 for Port Everglades, Florida, and the AUTEC range in the Bahamas to conduct WSAT. The crash at sea of a U.S. Drug Enforcement Administration helicopter interrupted the WSAT, as Koelsch acted as the on-scene commander of a search and rescue effort that recovered two Bahamian police officers who had been passengers on board the helicopter. The frigate returned to Mayport on 14 January, and with the guidance provided by the local NWAT from 16 to 20 January, she completed a Technical Assist Visit (TAV) on 26 and 27 January that earned her full Nuclear Weapons Certification. Koelsch got underway on 1 February and proceeded to the AUTEC range where she completed WSAT the next day. The ship and crew conducted refresher training during the rest of the month and into March. After completing a final battle problem on 12 March, the ship passed an underway Operational Propulsion Plant Examination (OPPE) the next day and proceeded to Charleston, arriving on 16 March for a weapons onload. The month ended on a solemn note as Koelsch conducted a burial-at-sea ceremony on the 28th. The frigate participated in CompTUEx 2-84 from 4 to 17 April, coordinating ASW exercises and conducting her first helicopter operations since overhaul. The ship visited Saint Thomas, U.S. Virgin Islands (18-20 April) and refueled at Roosevelt Roads before returning to Mayport on the 25th to begin a restricted availability period that lasted until 4 June. Koelsch then conducted a Quality Assurance Service Test (QAST) on 13 June and began an Intermediate Maintenance Availability (IMAV) on the 25th. All gun ammunition was offloaded during welding work in the magazines, and the ship completed her IMAV on 27 July. From 2 to 9 August the frigate conducted operations with the aircraft carrier USS Independence, as well as Surface Ship Radiated Noise Measurements (SSRNM) tests. From 21 August to 7 September Koelsch participated in ReadiEx 2-84, conducting AAW and gunnery exercises. During her subsequent pre-overseas movement work-up the ship installed an AN/SQR-15 Towed Array Sonar System (TASS), which she tested underway on 27 to 29 September. She conducted a one-day dependents' cruise on 4 October.

Getting underway on 13 October 1984 for her first post-overhaul deployment, Koelsch arrived at Gibraltar on 23 October and completed a turnover with guided missile cruiser Biddle (CG-34) before proceeding to Trieste, Italy, testing her AN/SQR-15 en route. The frigate remained at Trieste (29 October-7 November) for an IMAV, followed by an ASW line period (8-28 November). During that time the ship trained with the submarine USS Gato and gained contact with an unidentified submarine. Koelsch then visited Palermo, Sicily (28 November-26 December), followed by another ASW line period until 4 January 1985 when she began an IMAV at Palma de Mallorca. Departing Palma on 14 January, the frigate suffered an engineering casualty the next day when a flareback in 1A boiler damaged 1A supercharger. The ship received an underway logistics replenishment from Butte on 19 January and returned to Las Palmas for five days before proceeding to Barcelona to replace 1A supercharger. Koelsch remained at Barcelona from 25 January to 15 February and then steamed to Naples, where she arrived on 18 February to begin preparations for operations in the Black Sea. Departing Naples on 1 March, the frigate conducted ASW line operations in the central Med before rendezvousing with guided missile cruiser Wainwright on 8 March and transiting the Turkish Straits into the Black Sea two days later. Following a week of exercises, Koelsch returned through the Bosphorus on 16 March and joined carrier USS Dwight D. Eisenhower in the eastern Mediterranean to provide escort service. The frigate returned to Naples on 26 March, and she departed the Italian port on 5 April to begin an ASW line period in the central Mediterranean. The ship entered an IMAV at Málaga, Spain (15-26 April), and while there received the Hook 'Em award for ASW excellence personally from Vice Admiral Frank B. Kelso III, Commander Sixth Fleet. Following a turnover with frigate USS Moinester, the ship departed Málaga on 26 April and arrived at Mayport on 7 May.

Following an NWAT visit (3-7 June 1985), Koelsch conducted a one-day sea trial on 10 June. The ship departed Mayport on 17 June to participate in ASW special operations in the western and mid-Atlantic for the remainder of the month. Breaking off from that work, the ship arrived at Bermuda on 3 July to conduct emergency repairs on 1B main feed pump and 1B boiler. Ordered home, the frigate arrived at Mayport on 7 July where she received two weeks of NWAT visits followed by passing the Navy Technical Proficiency Inspection (NTPI) on 25 July. After over two months in port, Hurricane Isabel forced Koelsch to sortie from Mayport, up the St. John's River, to Blount Island on 9 October, returning home the next day. Following successful sea trials (15-17 October), the ship received a series of inspections and reviews, after-which she steamed for Charleston to offload ammunition (20-21 November). Returning to Mayport on 22 November, the next day contractors began removing the AN/SQR-15 Towed Array Sonar System (TASS), completing the job on 27 November. Koelsch departed Mayport on 2 December to conduct drone services for the Guided Missile Hydrofoil Gunboat (PHM) Squadron 2, based at Key West, Florida. Exercises were conducted on 5 December, and the frigate departed Key West four days later, providing submarine support services in the Jacksonville area before returning to Mayport on 13 December.

Koelsch conducted independent exercises in the Jacksonville area during January 1986, then assisted in search and rescue operations in the wake of the Space Shuttle Challenger disaster (28-31 January). Remaining at Mayport from 1 February to 12 March, the frigate passed a surprise NTPI (12-13 February). She completed an OPPE (24-25 March) and received a diesel inspection and auxiliary systems readiness review (31 March-4 April). Having offloaded ammunition on 3 April, Koelsch then entered a selective restricted availability (17 April-7 July). Following a training readiness evaluation (10-11 July), the ship conducted independent exercises in the Jacksonville operations area (14-16 July and 28–31 July). After a series of inspections and reviews, Koelsch got underway for Charleston on 26 August, onloading ammunition at the weapons station the next day. Stopping to refuel at Mayport on 29 August, the frigate spent 1 September to 17 October in refresher training at Guantanamo Bay, undergoing a rigorous schedule of training involving in-port and underway exercises. The ship and crew visited Grenada (24-26 October) and conducted NGFS exercises at Vieques (28-29 October) and ASW exercises with U.S. submarines at the AUTEC range, Andros Island, Bahamas (2-3 November). Embarking HSL-32, Detachment 9 on 26 November, the frigate got underway on 3 December for Roosevelt Roads, where members of the USCG Tactical Law Enforcement Team embarked for law enforcement operations (8-14 December) followed by a visit to Guantanamo Bay. She returned to Mayport on 20 December.

Koelsch embarked HSL-32, Detachment 9 on 5 January 1987 and departed for Roosevelt Roads two days later, arriving on 10 January when five members of the United States Coast Guard team embarked again for law enforcement operations, during which time the ship investigated fifty-one motor vessels and pleasure craft in support of the Coast Guard's mission to stop drug transport in the area (11-30 January). On 13 January, the Coast Guardsmen operating from Koelsch discovered 18 kilograms of cocaine on board the Columbian-registered Granelero II, and arrested all twenty of the crewmembers. After placing a prize crew on board the Columbian vessel, the frigate rendezvoused on the 15th with USCGC Nunivak (WPB-1306) and transferred the cocaine and prisoners, along with Granelero II, to U.S. Federal authorities at San Juan, Puerto Rico. Following a visit to Antigua (2-4 February), the frigate returned to Mayport and entered an intermediate maintenance availability on 9 February that lasted until 12 March. Koelsch then hosted HMS Bristol (D23) during a British squadron's visit to Mayport (4-14 March). The U.S. frigate conducted a successful ASROC warshot proof test and two exercise torpedo shots in the local operations area (16-17 March). Embarking HSL-32, Detachment 9 on the 20th, she departed Mayport the next day to conduct her third law enforcement operation in four months. En route, the ship conducted a burial at sea service for CS1 William P. Wallace, USN (Ret.) off the Bahamas. Embarking a USCG team at Guantanamo Bay on 23 March, Koelsch conducted law enforcement operations until 12 April, investigating 112 motor vessels and pleasure craft for contraband during that time. On 23 March, the embarked helicopter detachment transported a civilian heart attack victim from USS Mount Baker, whose crew had recovered him from his sailboat, to the Guantanamo Bay Naval Hospital. On 1 April, three bags of marijuana were discovered floating in the water. After testing the contents for THC, they were destroyed. After disembarking the law enforcement team at Roosevelt Roads on the 12th, the ship visited St. Croix (14-18 April). Koelsch conducted NGFS qualifications and spotting services at Vieques (19-22 April), expending over 400 5-inch rounds.

Returning to Mayport on 25 April 1987, the frigate underwent several inspections and assist visits during May, along alteration of her major automatic boiler control system (28 April-6 May). Koelsch executed a highly successful defense nuclear surety inspection (1-2 June), receiving an overall grade of satisfactory with no discrepancies. On 7 to 12 June the Board of Inspection Survey (INSURV) inspected virtually every compartment and piece of equipment on board the ship. Although she received a satisfactory grade, and the INSURV found her fit for further service, but determined her not to be combat effective. From 15 June to 3 July, the frigate received installation of the SSQ-99 electronic support measures (ESM) van for use during Central American special operations in the eastern Pacific.

Following the embarkation of a Naval Security Group detachment, Koelsch got underway on 10 July 1987 for Naval Station Rodman, Panama to participate in special operations in the eastern Pacific Ocean. Stopping to refuel at Guantanamo Bay, the ship transited the Panama Canal on 15 July, putting into Rodman that evening. With a FIM-92 Stinger missile detachment embarked, the frigate conducted routine special operations (20-29 July), visiting Puerto Quetzal, Guatemala, until 1 August to refuel, re-provision, and conduct minor repairs. From 1 August to 7 October, Koelsch spent fifty-six days at sea conducting special operations in the eastern Pacific in support of Commander, Task Force (CTF) 84 and Joint Task Force (JTF) Bravo.

During that deployment, the ship made several good will visits to Central American ports. While the ship was in port at Rodman (10-13 August 1987), several crewmembers helped refurbish school desks and provide athletic equipment to a rural Panamanian elementary school. Later, several sailors delivered Project Handclasp food and medical supplies to an orphanage and street children's program in Guatemala City (22-25 August). During a visit to Puerto Quetzal (16-19 September) crewmembers painted an elementary school and delivered Handclasp materials in the area. With the conclusion of that stint of special operations, Koelsch put into Rodman before transiting the Panama Canal on the 10th.

During the ship's final visit to Rodman, however, members of the Panamanian Defense Forces arrested three Koelsch sailors, along with six United States Air Force people, falsely accusing them of anti-government activities. After 20 hours of detention, and following a strong formal protest by the U.S. government, the Panamanians released the nine Americans but required them to remain in Panama to attend a hearing. The three sailors later rejoined their ship at New Orleans. Meanwhile, the ship anchored at Montego Bay, Jamaica, on 12 October for three days of liberty. After a stop at Guantanamo Bay on the 16th, Koelsch arrived at New Orleans on 21 October to participate in the Navy League's Fleet Week, supporting the visit of the Commander in Chief, U.S. Atlantic Fleet, and hosting over 3,200 visitors. The ship departed New Orleans on the 26th with 60 guests embarked for a "Tiger Cruise," that ended when the ship reached Mayport on 29 October.

Koelsch began a two-month IMAV on 2 November 1987, interrupted by a visit to Charleston on 10 December to offload ammunition in preparation for a regular overhaul at Bath Iron Works), Portland, Maine. Completing the IMAV on 31 December 1987, the frigate departed Mayport on 4 January 1988 and arrived at Portland three days later. Work on the ship proceeded at an irregular pace, however, due to uncertainty about her final status. CinCLantFlt issued a stop work order to Bath Iron Works on 28 January 1988 to limit the cost of the overhaul after announcing the proposed decommissioning of all Garcia-class frigates. Work resumed on 25 February, but the uncertainty regarding the ship's future dampened the spirits of both shipyard workers and crew. Lack of funding forced cancellation of some overhaul work including major repairs to the sonar dome, replacement of the forward 5-inch gun mount, and a full overhaul of the Naval Tactical Data System (NTDS) equipment.

On 21 March 1988, the United States Department of Defense announced that Garcia- and Brooke-class frigates would be mothballed or made available for foreign military sales. On 16 April, the Chief of Naval Operations ordered that the ship be in a "fully functional condition" at the end of the overhaul, but continued ambiguity resulted in Bath Iron Works' falling further and further behind schedule. ComNavSurfLant recommended Koelsch for foreign military sale on 30 April, and on 20 May defined the term "fully functional" to provide guidance for the work. Nevertheless, a management change and low manning at BIW put work on the ship six weeks behind the revised schedule by the end of July. Negotiations led to a revised contract with a completion date of 3 February 1989.

On 18 August 1988, it was announced that Koelsch was a primary candidate for lease by Pakistan. Although the date would be revised, on 22 September ComNavSurfLant directed that the frigate be decommissioned at Charleston on 27 March 1989 with a "hot ship" turnover to the Pakistani Navy. Bath Iron Works increased worker manning level to 140% of that planned on 9 October, but delays in the U.S. President's signature on the foreign military sales case delayed the decommissioning date to 31 May.

Despite a contractual impasse in January 1989, BIW completed Koelsch's ROH on 28 February. On that day, the ship departed Portland for Charleston, where she arrived on 3 March. The ship began the official decommissioning stand-down on 7 March. All NTDS equipment was laid up pending Pakistan Navy sailors qualifying technicians to maintain it. On 16 March, the crew removed or destroyed all cryptographic equipment and installed bypass cables to increase the number of non-secure voice circuits. All Chemical, Biological, and Radiological (CBR) equipment was removed from the ship and all unneeded classified documents destroyed. The Pakistani Navy completed the training plan on 24 March, covering all areas of shipboard operation and maintenance, with particular attention to engineering watch-standing to ensure the safe steaming of the ship to Karachi. All satellite communications and SITE-TV equipment were removed on 28 and 29 March. Test equipment, spare parts, and technical manuals were removed on 11 April and turned in to Defense Reutilization Management Office. The Pakistani crew arrived on board the ship in thirds on 15, 24, and 28 April. Engineering cold plant and damage control training began the week of the 17th, and the crew lit off the engineering plant and continued training the Pakistani crewmen on 24 April. Koelsch got underway on 9 May to give three days of hands-on training in every operational area of the ship. The Pakistan Navy crew participated fully in all evaluations ranging from cold checks prior to light-off through general quarters, conducting a main space fire drill and gun shoot. All engineering, weapons, and operations sailors stood watch and operated all equipment under the supervision of U.S. crewmen. In the same manner, from 16 to 18 May, Koelsch sailors trained the Pakistani crew of Hunain (ex-USS Talbot). Koelsch's crew held their final picnic on 21 May and their final awards ceremony on 26 May.

=== Navy of Pakistan ===
Decommissioned on 31 May 1989 at Charleston, Koelsch was transferred to the Pakistani Navy on the same day under the terms of a five-year lease agreement. She was recommissioned as Siqqat (F-267).

=== Fate ===
Because Pakistan would not stop its nuclear weapons program, the lease was cancelled in 1994. Returned to U.S. custody at Singapore on 19 August 1994, former Koelsch was stricken from the Navy Register the same day. Transferred to the Maritime Administration the following 9 September, on the same date she was sold to Trusha Investments Pte. Ltd, c/o Jacques Pierot, Jr. & Sons, Inc., of New York City for $625,824. She was then towed to Hong Kong and scrapped.

== Namesake ==
Koelsch was named for Navy helicopter pilot Lt(jg) John Kelvin Koelsch, who was awarded the Medal of Honor for actions during the Korean War. On 3 July 1951, Koelsch and his crewman attempted to rescue a downed Marine aviator from enemy territory. Under heavy fire, Koelsch's helicopter was shot down; Koelsch, his crewman, and the Marine aviator survived the crash and evaded the enemy for nine days before being captured. Lt(jg) John Koelsch died of malnutrition and dysentery in a prisoner-of-war camp three months later.

== Insignia ==
The dominant figure of the insignia is the chess knight, a most mobile and versatile piece, that is a fitting symbol of a mobile and versatile ocean escort. The blue ribbon with white stars in the background symbolizes the Medal of Honor earned by Lt. (j.g.) Koelsch, while a prisoner of war in Korea. The emblem and the ship's name and motto are enclosed in a double line with two square knots, the double line symbolizing the unit of the service and square knots symbolizing the strength of the service. The black knight represents strength of convictions; blue, the sea; and white, the purity of purpose. The ship's motto was "Valor [and] Versatility."
